= Glenwood =

Glenwood may refer to:

== Places ==
=== Canada ===
- Glenwood, Alberta (village)
- Glenwood, Alberta (former hamlet)
- Glenwood, Edmonton, a neighbourhood in Edmonton, Alberta
- Glenwood, Manitoba
- Glenwood, Northumberland County, New Brunswick, Canada
- Glenwood, Restigouche County, New Brunswick, Canada
- Glenwood, Newfoundland and Labrador
- Glenwood, Nova Scotia
- Glenwood, Winnipeg

=== United States ===
- Glenwood, Alabama
- Glenwood, Arkansas
- Glenwood, California, Santa Cruz County
- Glenwood Canyon, Colorado
- Glenwood Springs, Colorado
- Glenwood, Florida
- Glenwood, Georgia, a city in Wheeler County
- Glenwood, Floyd County, Georgia, an unincorporated community
- Glenwood, Illinois
- Glenwood, Indiana
- Glenwood, Iowa
- Glenwood Plantation, Maine
- Glenwood, Harford County, Maryland
- Glenwood, Howard County, Maryland
- Glenwood, Minnesota
- Glenwood, Missouri
- Glenwood, Nebraska
- Glenwood Township, Gage County, Nebraska
- Glenwood, New Jersey, part of Vernon Township
- Glenwood, New Mexico
- Glenwood, New York
- Glenwood (Troy, New York), a.k.a. Eddy Titus Mansion, historic home in Rensselaer County
- Glenwood (Metro-North station), commuter rail station in Glenwood, Yonkers, New York
- Glenwood, North Carolina
- Glenwood (Enon, North Carolina)
- Glenwood, Lane County, Oregon
- Glenwood, Washington County, Oregon
- Glenwood, Utah
- Glenwood, Virginia
- Glenwood (South Boston, Virginia), a historic plantation estate
- Glenwood, Kitsap County, Washington
- Glenwood, Klickitat County, Washington
- Glenwood, Whitman County, Washington
- Glenwood, Mason County, West Virginia
- Glenwood, Mercer County, West Virginia
- Glenwood, a mansion in West Virginia that is listed on the National Register of Historic Places as the Laidley-Summers-Quarrier House
- Glenwood, Wisconsin
- Glenwood City, Wisconsin
- Glenwood Park, Atlanta, Georgia

=== Other countries ===
- Glenwood, New South Wales, Australia
- Glenwood, Queensland, Australia
- Glenwood, KwaZulu-Natal, a suburb of Durban, South Africa
- Glenwood, Glenrothes, Fife, Scotland
- Glenwood, a former council ward covering parts of Castlemilk, Glasgow, Scotland

== Education ==
- Glenwood Institute, defunct private boarding school in Matawan, New Jersey
- Glenwood School, various schools

== Games ==
- Glenwood (card game), a patience or solitaire also known as Duchess.

== Literature ==
- Rex Morgan, M.D.#Story and characters

== See also ==
- Glenwood Cemetery
- Glenwood Historic District (disambiguation)
