= Spring to Spring Trail =

Trail in Florida, USA

Spring to Spring trail is a multi-use trail in Volusia County, Florida. It is under development and plans call for it to cover 26 miles (42 km). The trail will connect Gemini Springs Park to DeLeon Springs State Park.

As of April 2014, 16 miles are complete and trailheads include the DeBary Hall Historic Site, Gemini Springs Park, Lake Monroe Park, Lake Beresford Park, Blue Spring State Park and along Grand Avenue in Glenwood, Florida.

This trail forms a section of the East Coast Greenway, a system of trails connecting Maine to Florida.

== See also ==
- Coast-to-Coast Trail
