= Gemini Springs Park =

Park in Florida, United States

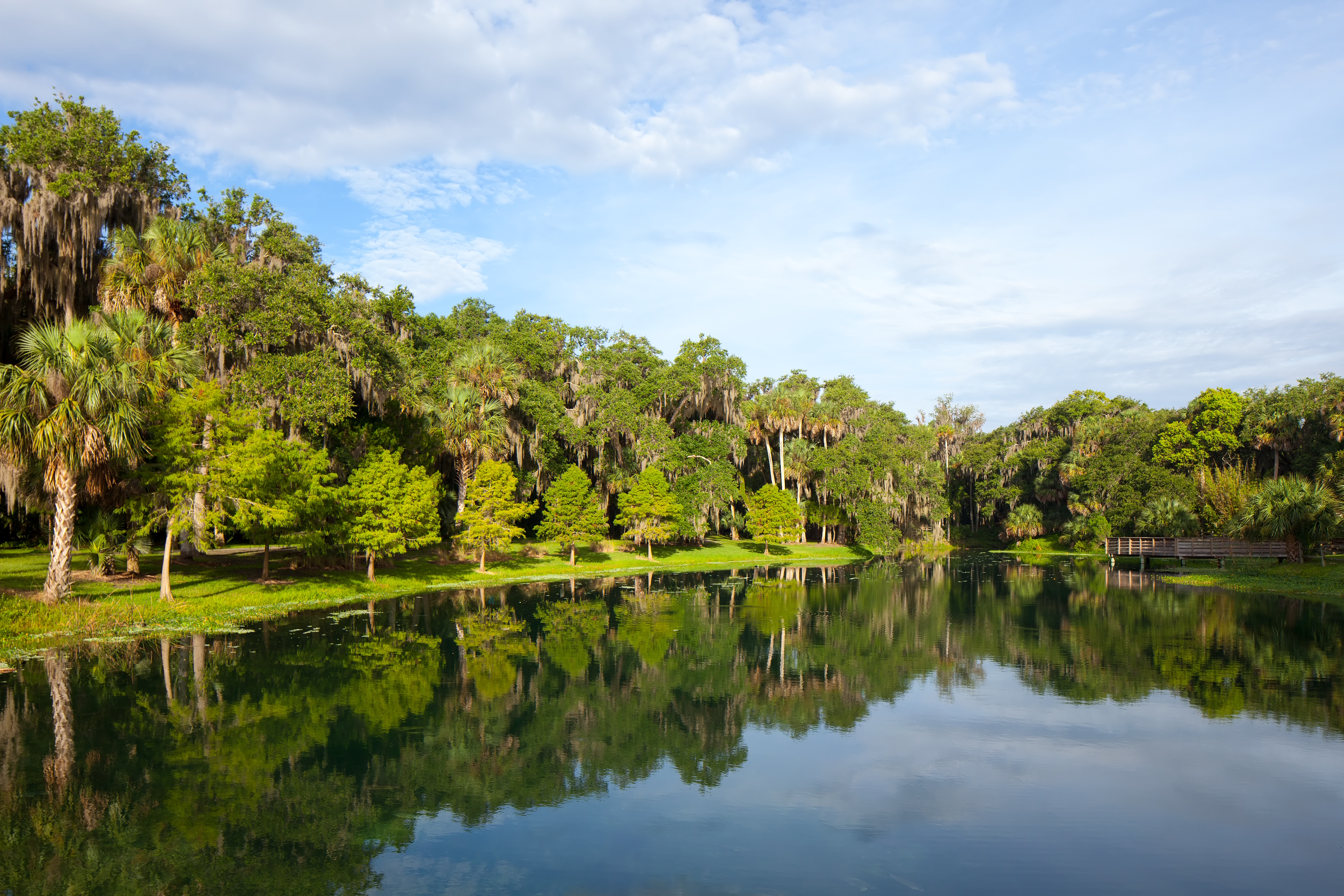
- Gemini Springs Park. View from the footbridge crossing the bayou looking toward the east. The fishing pier is in the distance.

- Location within Volusia County
- Location: DeBary, Volusia County, Florida
- Coordinates: 28°51′54″N 81°18′39″W
- Area: 210 acres (85 ha; 0.33 sq mi)
- Created: October 27, 1996
- Operator: Volusia County Parks, Recreation and Culture Division
- Visitors: 57,755 (2005 estimate)
- Open: Sunrise to sunset

Gemini Springs Park is a 210-acre (85 ha) public nature park in DeBary, Florida, United States featuring two springs. The park, completed in 1996, is situated on bayou northwest of Lake Monroe.

== Description ==
Gemini Springs Park is located immediately northwest of Lake Monroe in DeBary, Florida on the DeBary Bayou. The park is situated on 210-acre (85 ha) of wooded land. 6.5 million gallons of fresh water flow from the park's two flowing springs each day. The park features a fishing pier, a fenced dog park, picnic pavilions, bicycle and hiking trails, a playground, campsites and restrooms.

== History ==
Cattle rancher Saundra Gray and her husband, Charles Gray, an Orlando attorney, purchased 160 acres of the Gemini Springs Farm in 1969 for $280,000, and later purchased adjacent property. After moving their cattle ranch operation from Osceola County to Gemini Springs Farm, they raised and bred Santa Gertudis cattle. They maintained most of the property in its natural state, only using a portion for cattle. They added an earthen dam near the springs, creating a reservoir at one end of the bayou.

=== Land acquisition ===
In 1986, the Grays drew criticism from environmentalists after selling a parcel of the farm along the DeBary bayou to a developer and pursuing plans to dredge the bayou to provide access for boats from a proposed condominium complex. In 1989, they sought permits for a 214-unit subdivision surrounding the springs, again prompting a reaction from environmentalists who urged the county to purchase the property for use as a passive park. Initially, the property was offered to the county for $7 million, $4 million less than the property was privately appraised for, according to Charles Gray. By 1993, the asking price for the property was reduced to $6 million.

The Gemini Springs property was jointly purchased in February 1994 for $5.65 million. Volusia County contributed $2.6 to the purchase. Florida Communities Trust contributed $2 million and St. Johns River Water Management District contributed $1.1 million.

=== Development ===
After purchasing the Gemini Springs property, Volusia County lacked funding to fully develop the park, but was able to acquire it in the following two years. Beginning in March 1996, $1.1 million in capital improvements were made to the park including building a 1,600-square-foot (150 m^{2}) floating dock for the swimming area, picnic pavilions, a wooden fishing pier and footbridges, a playground, restrooms and other amenities.

=== Operation ===
Gemini Springs Park officially opened on October 27, 1996. During the first few years of operation, the park had around 88,250 visitors each year, largely due to a popular swimming area in the reservoir near the spring boil. Just prior to Labor Day in 2000 the swimming area was closed after health department officials detected dangerous levels of enterococci bacteria, a type of bacteria found in the fecal matter of warm-blooded animals. Annual park attendance dropped to 55,348 after the swimming area closed, prompting the Volusia County Council to suspend the $3.50 park admission. The swimming area has not since been re-opened.

A 4.5-acre (1.8 ha) fenced dog park was opened in June 2005, at a cost of $35,000. The dog park has a section for large dogs, and a separate section for smaller dogs.

== See also ==
- Blue Spring State Park
- De Leon Springs State Park
- Green Springs Park
