= Green Springs Park =

Park in Enterprise, Florida, United States

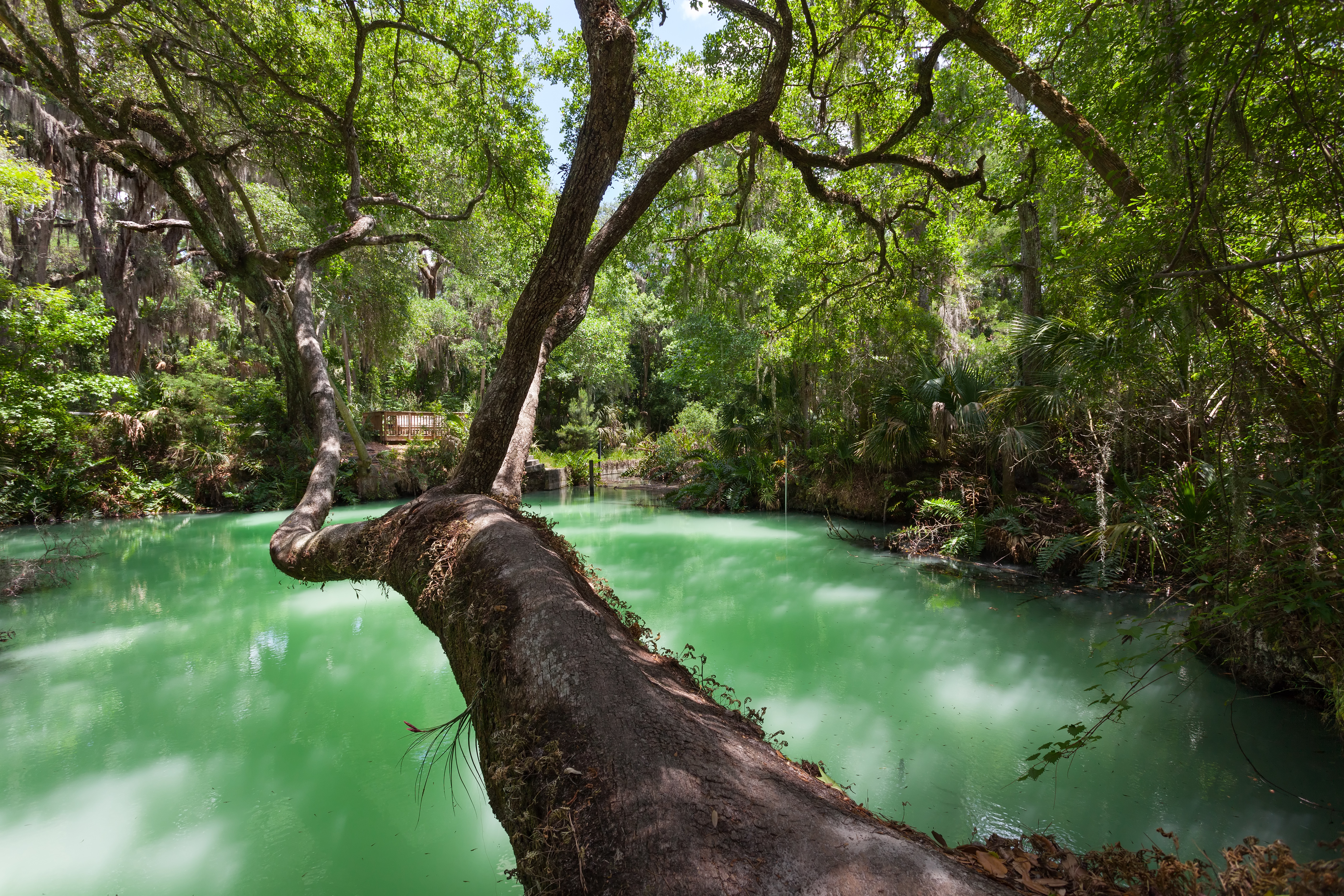
- Green Springs viewed from the west bank looking toward the east

- Location within Volusia County
- Location: Enterprise, Volusia County, Florida
- Coordinates: 28°51′46″N 81°14′51″W
- Area: 36 acres (15 ha; 0.056 sq mi)
- Created: September 27, 2008
- Operator: Volusia County Parks, Recreation and Culture Division
- Open: Sunrise to sunset

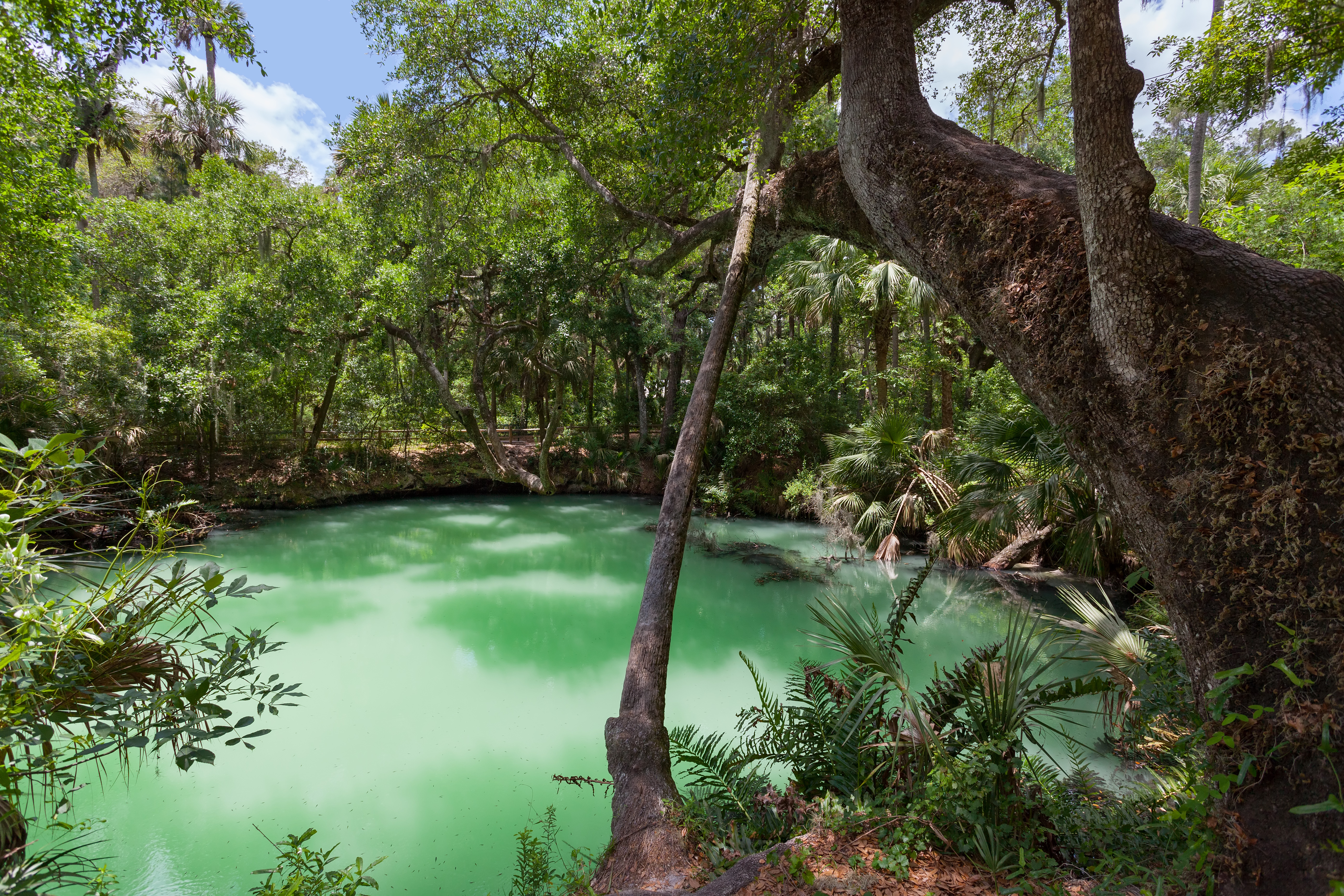
Green Springs viewed from the east bank looking toward the west

Green Springs Park is public park in Enterprise, Florida, featuring a green-hued sulfur spring. The spring was once part of a 19th century health resort and the surrounding area is a notable archeological site. After more than 20 years of effort to acquire and develop the site, the park opened in September 2008.

== Description ==
Green Springs Park is located near the north shore of Lake Monroe, approximately 2.5 miles (4.0 km) east of Interstate 4 in Enterprise, Florida. The spring supplies fresh water to Lake Monroe from the Florida aquifer. The spring basin is about 70 feet (21 m) wide by about 76 feet (23 m) deep. The water varies in color depending on the time of year, changing from green in the spring to more of a turquoise color in summer, back to green in the fall and finally to jade in the winter.

The park's ecosystem is primarily a hardwood hammock, host to several rare species of plant life, including Epidendrum magnoliae, or green-fly orchid. A 12-foot-wide (3.7 m) paved path and numerous primitive paths cross and loop though the park, under cover of live oak, magnolia, cedar and pine. The park is also a trail head for two bicycle routes: the East Central Regional Rail Trail and the Spring to Spring Trail.

Green Springs Park is a significant archaeological and historical site. A huge shell midden existed near the spring run before being depleted for road building and fertilizer prior to 1885. The few remaining deposits contain primitive tools, pottery sherds, as well as remains of humans and animals.

== History ==
=== Early history ===
Green Springs was once an important site for Native Americans, such as the Mayaca and the Seminole, who favored the supposed healing properties of its sulfur water. The area near the spring was first settled in 1841 by Cornelius Taylor. Taylor constructed a hotel on a large shell mound near where the spring run empties into Lake Monroe. He promoted his hotel as a health spa, offering the spring's "restorative" powers to people with illnesses.

By 1883, the spring was on property owned by wealthy New York wine importer Frederic DeBary, whose DeBary Hall guests used the spring recreationally.

=== Land acquisition ===
In December 1984, Bill Canty, who owned an adjacent five acre parcel, introduced a proposal to the Volusia County Council seeking to rezone the Green Springs site for a 250 unit condominium complex. At the urging of local residents, the Council denied Canty's proposal and decided instead to explore the possibility of acquiring property for use as an ecotourism site.

In 1985, U.S. Representative Bill Chappell attempted to secure federal funds to purchase the spring and 29 acres (12 ha; 0.045 sq mi) of surrounding land from its private owner, Inga Friend, who had owned the property since 1954. Negotiations began between Friend and the county, but broke down largely because of Friend's desire to exclude the spring from the purchase.

In 1986, DeLand lawyer Larry Sands purchased the property from Inga Friend and her daughter, Lani, for $250,000. The purchase did not include the spring, but did include a first right of refusal agreement, should the Friends consent to sell it in the future.

By 2001, plans were made to create a passive park at the site, with mulch or shell paths and minimal parking.

=== Park development ===
After nearly 24 years of planning, negotiation, and grant seeking, Green Springs Park neared completion in 2008. Prior to opening, county staff, Florida Native Plant Society members, master naturalists, and other volunteers canvassed the site, removed exotic and invasive plants species that would threaten the delicate native ecosystem. The park was officially opened on September 27, 2008, the result of near $1 million invested in land acquisition and improvements.

== See also ==
- Blue Spring State Park
- De Leon Springs State Park
