= Glenwood, Washington =

Glenwood, Washington may refer to the following places in the U.S. state of Washington:

- Glenwood, Kitsap County, Washington, an unincorporated community in Kitsap County
- Glenwood, Klickitat County, Washington, an unincorporated community in Klickitat County
- Glenwood, Whitman County, Washington, an unincorporated community in Whitman County
