= East Central Regional Rail Trail =

Rail trail in Florida, United States

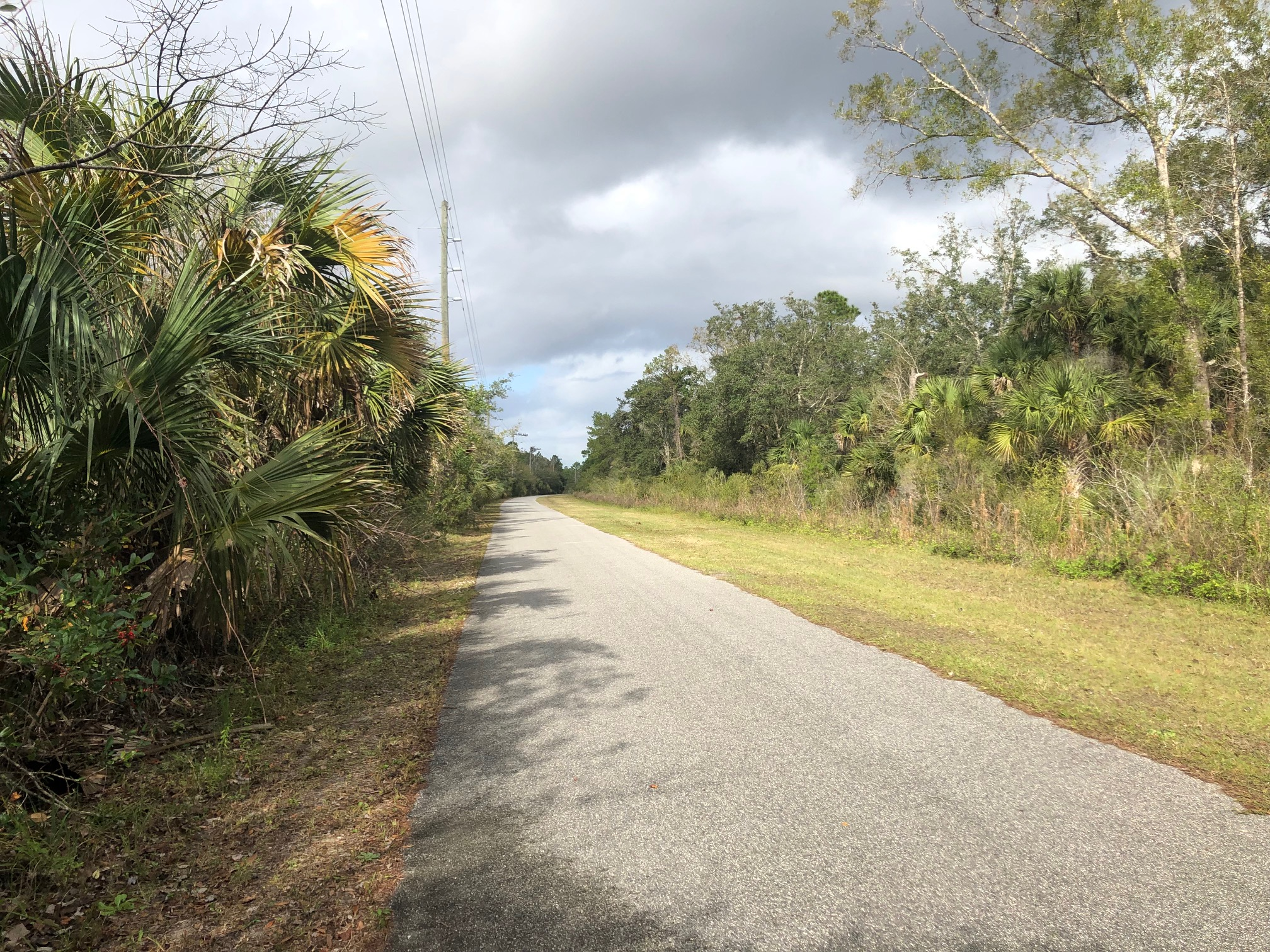
The trail near Titusville, Florida

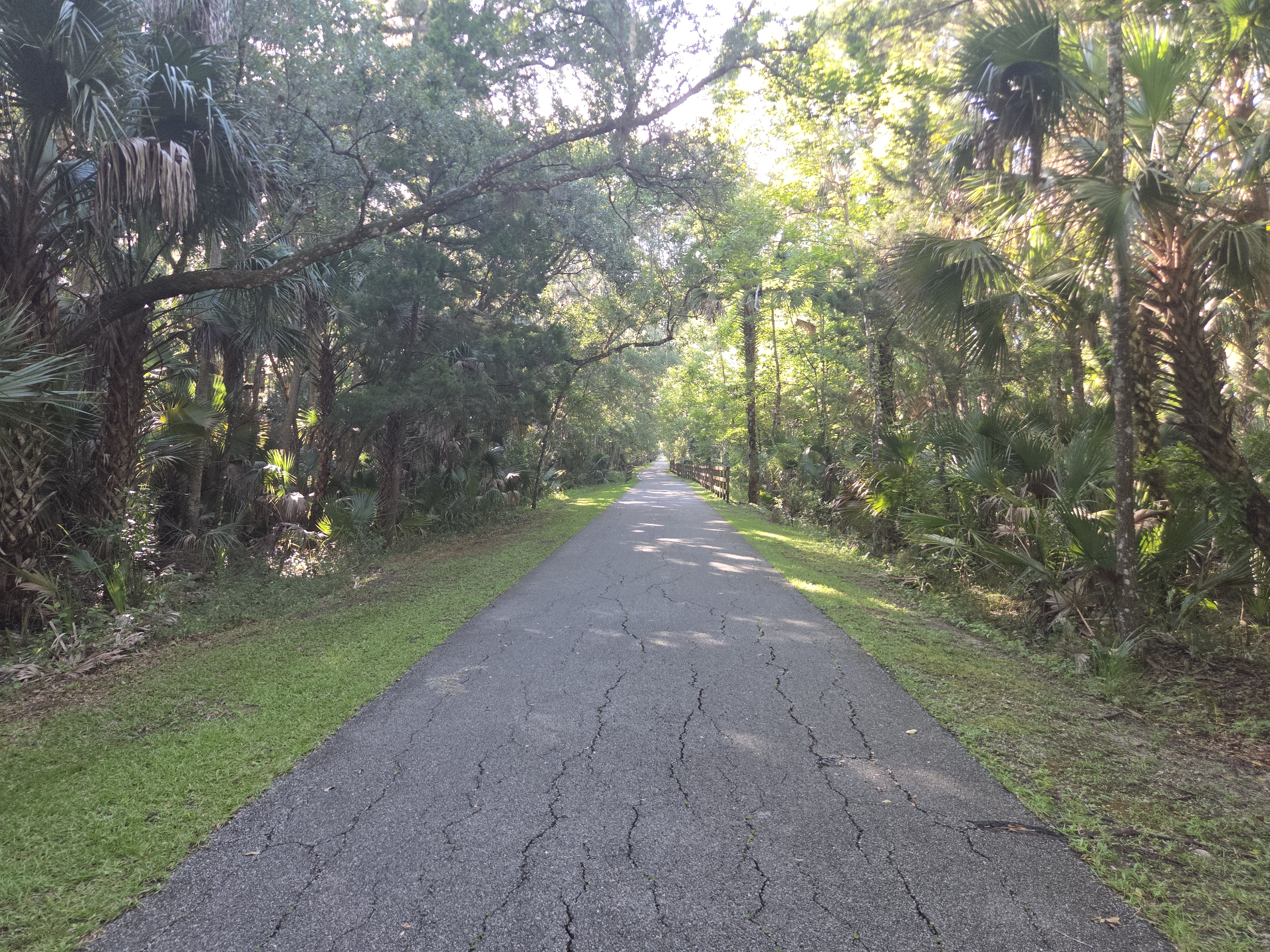
Eastward view of the East Central Rail Trail in Deltona, Florida.

East Coast Regional Rail Trail is a planned 52-mile paved multi-use trail in Volusia County, Florida and Brevard County, Florida connecting from Enterprise, Florida to Edgewater, Florida with a 10-mile leg to Titusville, Florida. From the trailhead at Green Springs Park, other trailheads are at Osteen, Maytown, Edgewater, and Titusville. It opened in March 2012 for use by walkers, joggers, in-line skaters, bicyclists, and people with disabilities. In September 2020, the trail is mostly completed with one 3-mile gap under construction. The trail includes portions of both the 250-mile Florida Coast-to-Coast Trail and 260-mile St. Johns River-to-Sea Loop.
