= George E. Turner Power Plant =

Coordinates: 28.869°N 81.273°W

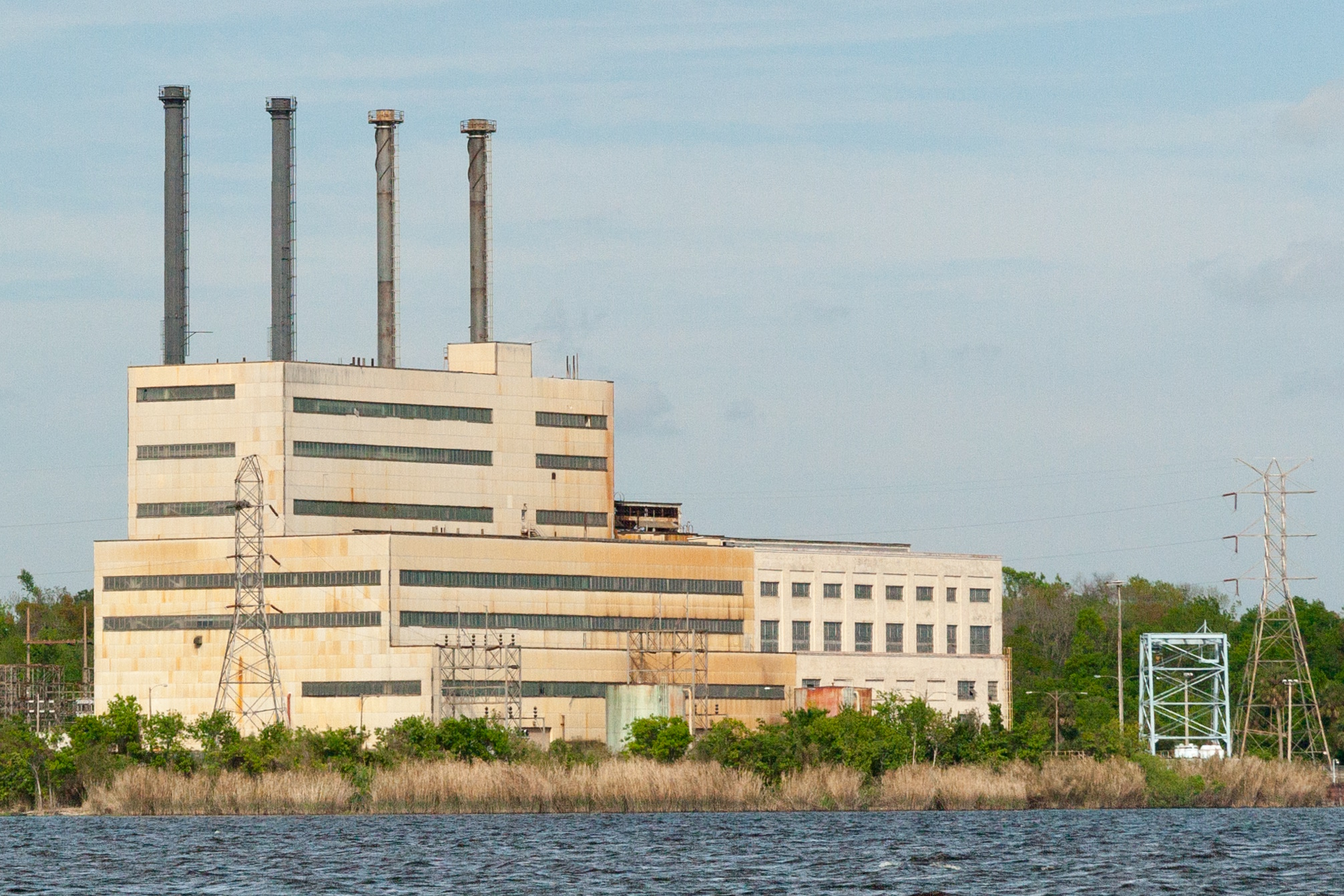
George E. Turner Power Plant in Enterprise, Florida. Viewed from Lake Monroe looking toward the northeast. March 11, 2006.

The George E. Turner Power Plant was a coal-burning, and later oil-burning, electrical power plant constructed on the north shore of Lake Monroe, in Enterprise, Florida, United States in 1926. The plant operated as an oil-burning power plant until 1994, providing electrical power to more than 300,000 homes during its peak. The plant was decommissioned in 1994, and occasionally used as a filming location for several television productions. The plant was razed in 2007, and the site now utilized as an ecological buffer zone.

== Description ==
The Turner Power Plant was located in Enterprise, Florida on the north shore of Lake Monroe, about one half mile east of Interstate 4. The 70,000-square-foot (6,500 m^{2}) facility consisted of an eight-story main building with horizontal windows and 60-foot (18 m) smoke stacks. The building was known to locals as the "birthday cake".

== History ==
The Florida Public Service Company built the Benson Springs Power Plant in what is now Enterprise, Florida, in 1926, to provide power for southwest Volusia County residents. The plant was equipped with a single, coal-fired generator capable of producing 11.5 kilowatts of electrical power.

After World War II, the Florida Public Service Company was merged with other companies and became Florida Power Company, and plant was renamed George E. Turner Power Plant, in honor of a long-time Florida Power Company executive. Additional generators were added, including a 25 megawatt generating unit. In 1947, the plant was acquired by Florida Power Corporation and converted to an oil-fired plant.

During its peak year in the 1960s and 1970s, the Turner plant provided electrical power to as many as 314,000 customers in Central Florida and consumed 5,000 barrels of oil per day.

=== Decommissioning ===
Florida Power Corporation announced a consolidation plan in 1993, resulting in the loss of 200 jobs and the closing of two power plants, including the Turner plant. The plant ceased operation in 1994, and was decommissioned two years later. Following a series of mergers, the plant came under the ownership of Progress Energy in 2000. Following its decommissioning, the plant was used as a filming location for several television productions including Fortune Hunter, Thunder in Paradise, and seaQuest DSV.

In 2006, the abandoned plant was used for fire department search-and-rescue training.

=== Demolition ===
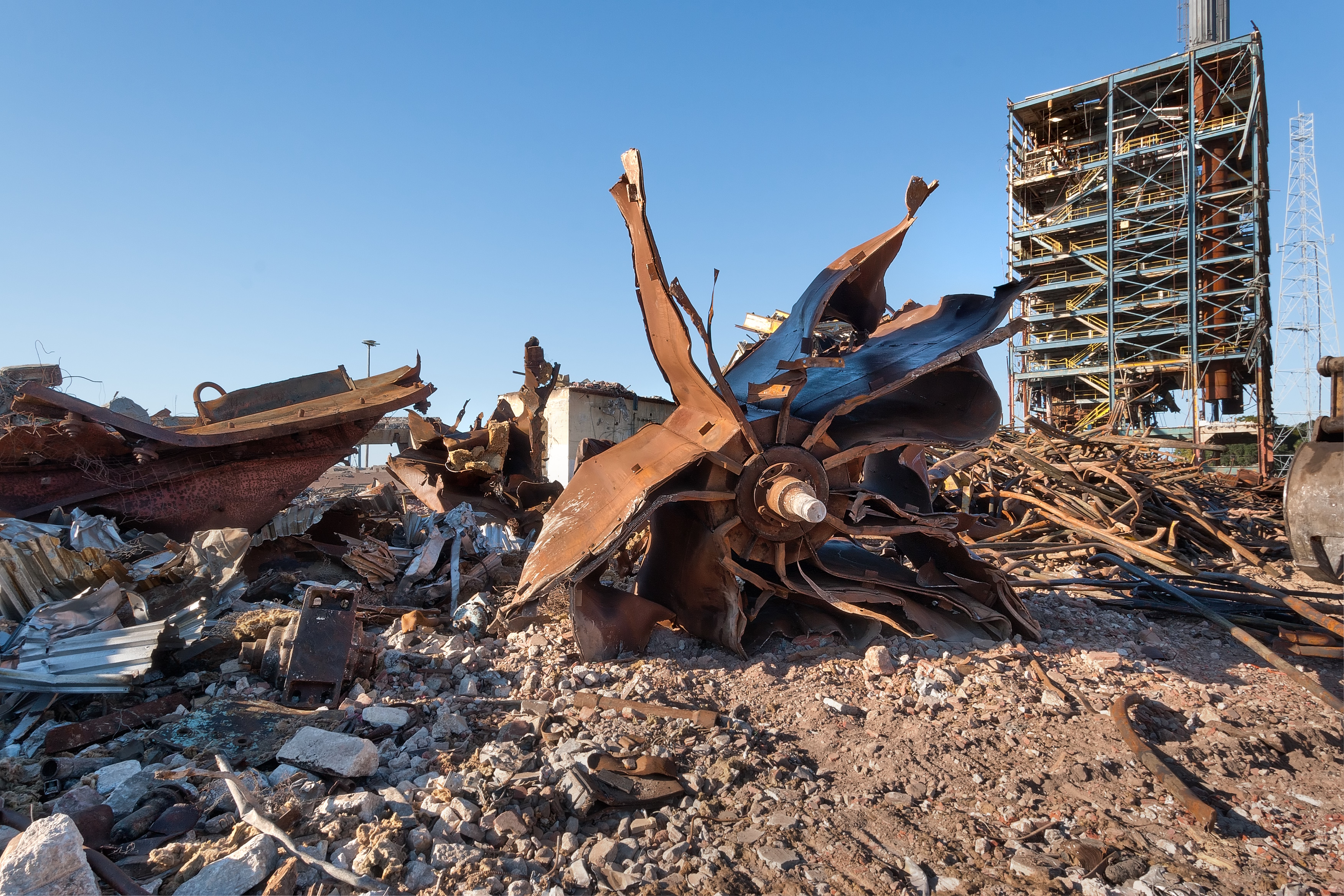
Demolition of the George E. Turner Power Plan. Portions of a turbine or fan are in the foreground. November 21, 2007.

As early as 2003, Progress Energy had begun discussions about dismantling the plant. In May 2007, they began demolishing the 70,000-square-foot (6,500 m^{2}) abandoned power plant, with plans to salvage 6,000 tons of metal. The demolition was completed in February 2008. The 120-acre site has been retained by Progress Energy as an ecological buffer area, separating Lake Monroe from a peak generation station across the street from the site.

== See also ==
- List of power stations in Florida
- Global warming
