= Konomac Lake =

Artificial lake in Florida, United States

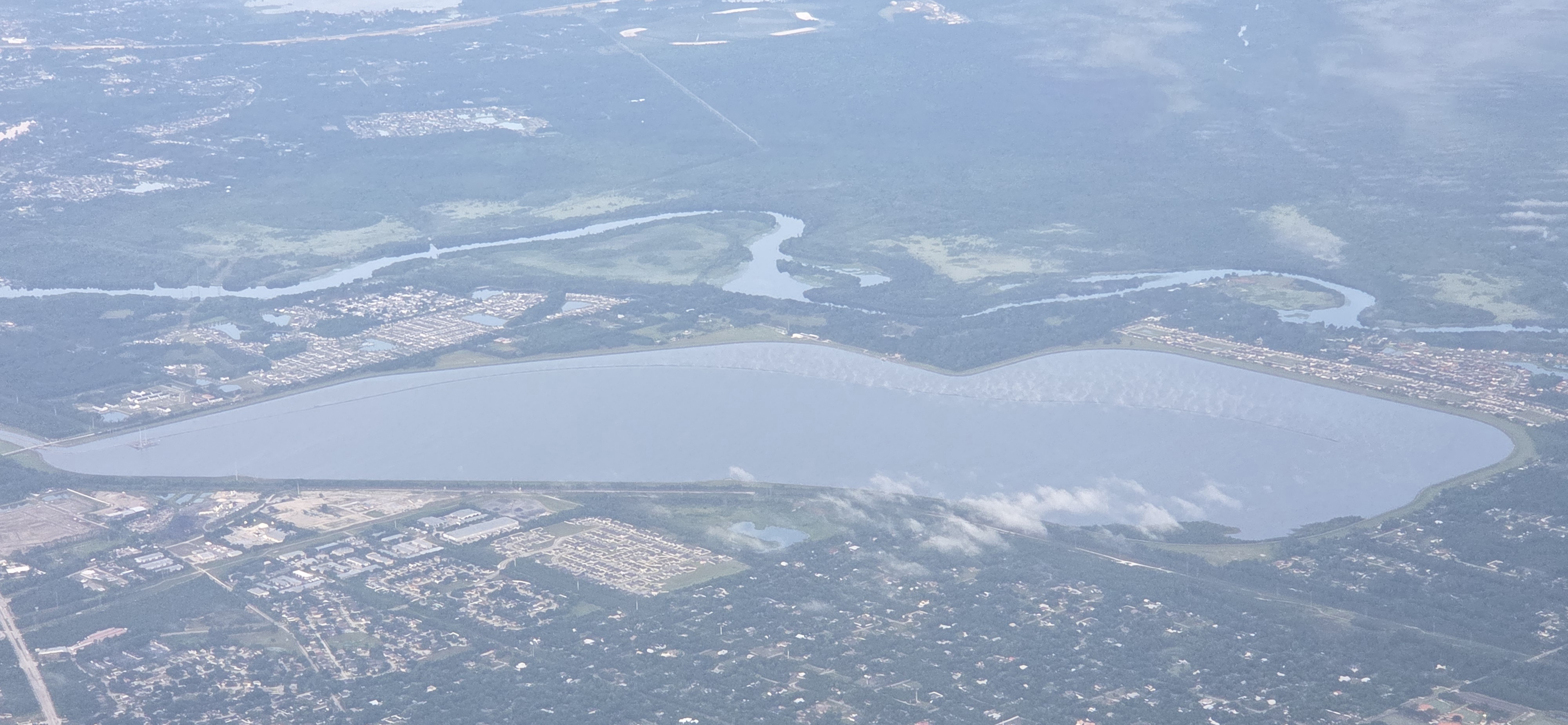

- Location of Konomac Lake in Florida Location of Konomac Lake in the United States
- Location: DeBary, Volusia County, Florida, United States
- Coordinates: 28.8687°N 81.3412°W
- Surface elevation: 23 feet (7.0 m)

Konomac Lake is an artificial lake found in DeBary, Florida. It has an area of around 1,100 acres (4.5 km^{2}). The lake is surrounded by suburban housing. It is used as a water reservoir for Florida Power & Light. Water from the lake is used to cool the local power plant.

Prior to human interaction, Konomac Lake served as a resource for the floral community around it. In the 1970s, the area Konomac Lake would occupy was dredged out and enlarged.
