= Jacob Brock =

American captain

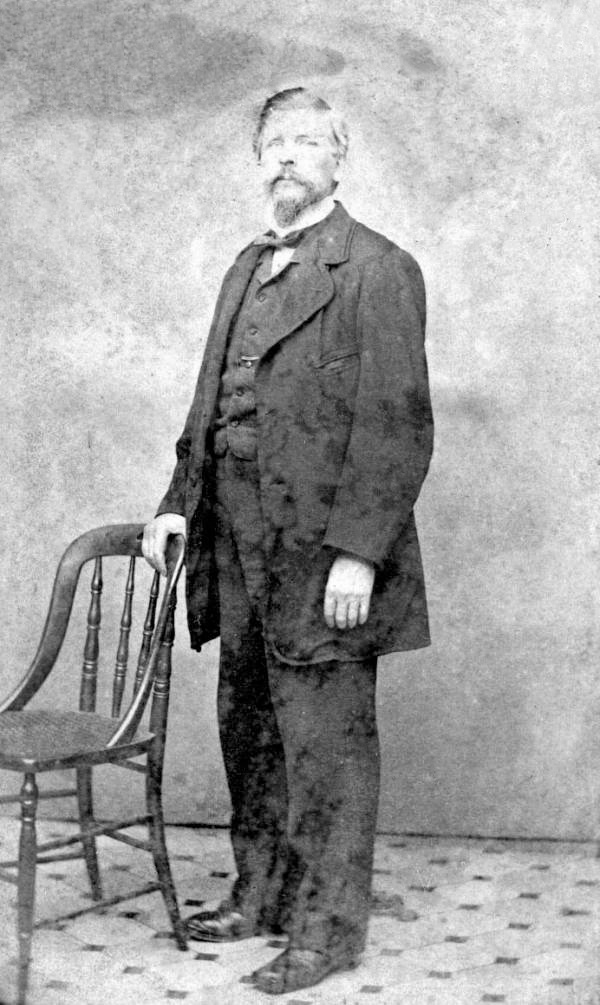
- Born: July 5, 1811; Hartford, Connecticut, US
- Died: September 22, 1876 (aged 66)
- Resting place: Jacksonville, Florida, US
- Occupation: Steamboat captain
- Known for: Founding Enterprise, Florida
- Spouse: Rhoda Stevens Brock
- Children: 2

Jacob Brock (July 5, 1810 – September 22, 1876) was an American steamboat captain and founder of Enterprise, Florida.

== Biography ==
Jacob Brock was born in Hartford, Connecticut on July 5, 1811. He was the third of twelve children born to Jacob Brock and Abigail Sanders.

In 1853, Brock bought a steamship that he named the Darlington. In 1860, he built a second steamboat which he named the Hattie after one of his daughters.
