= DeBary, Florida =

- City
- City of DeBary
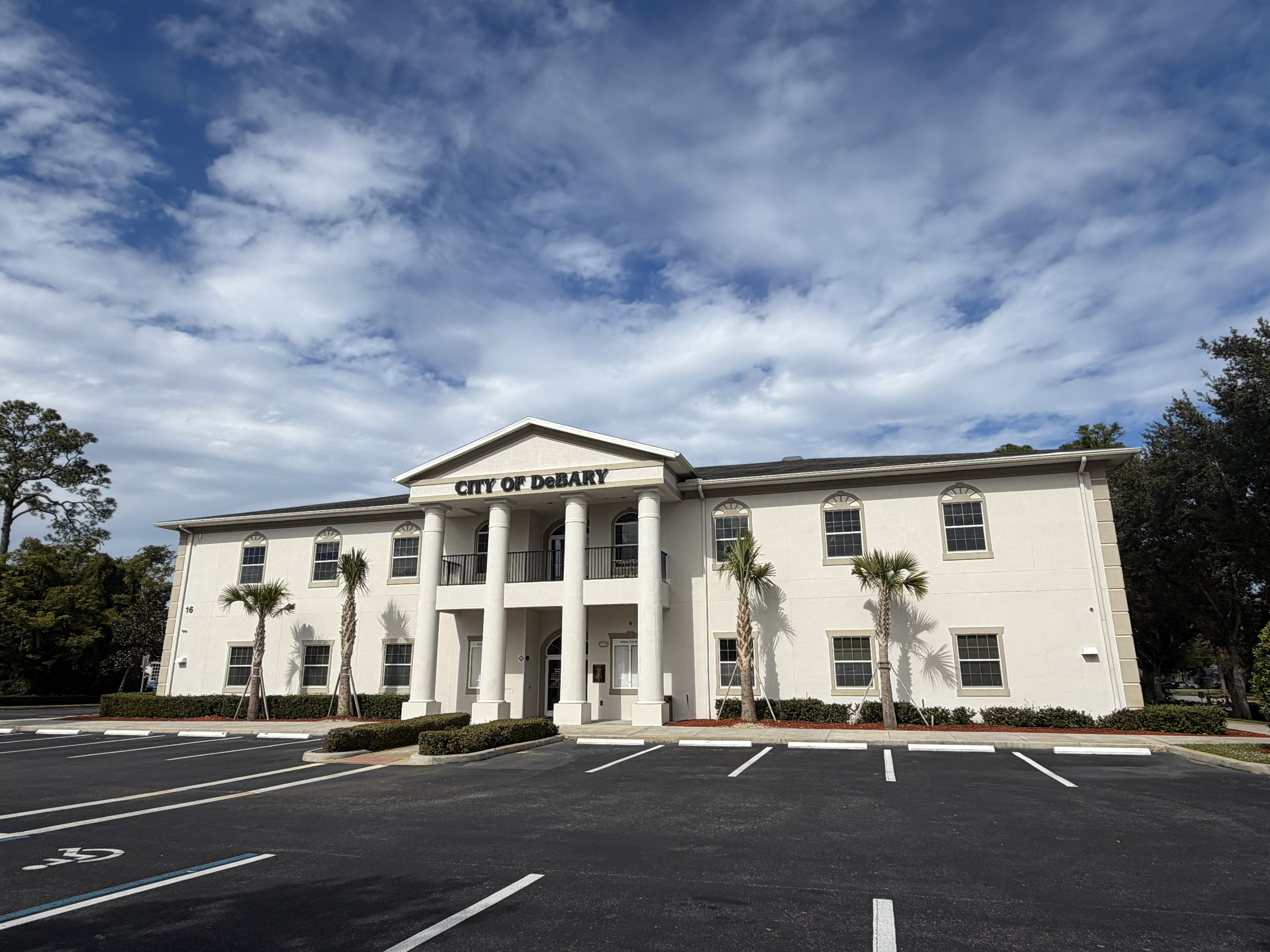
- City hall

- Flag Seal
- Nickname: The River City
- Location in Volusia County and the state of Florida
- Coordinates: 28°52′26″N 81°19′28″W
- Country: United States
- State: Florida
- County: Volusia
- Incorporated: December 31, 1993

Government
  - Type: Council–manager

Area
  - City: 21.79 sq mi (56.43 km^{2})
  - Land: 18.95 sq mi (49.08 km^{2})
  - Water: 2.83 sq mi (7.34 km^{2})
- Elevation: 56 ft (17 m)

Population (2020)
  - City: 22,260
  - Estimate (2025): 23,544
  - Density: 1,174.6/sq mi (453.51/km^{2})
  - Urban: 147,713
  - Metro: 494,593
- Time zone: UTC-5 (EST)
  - Summer (DST): UTC-4 (EDT)
- ZIP code(s): 32713, 32753
- Area code: 386
- FIPS code: 12-16675
- GNIS feature ID: 2404199
- Website: www.debary.org

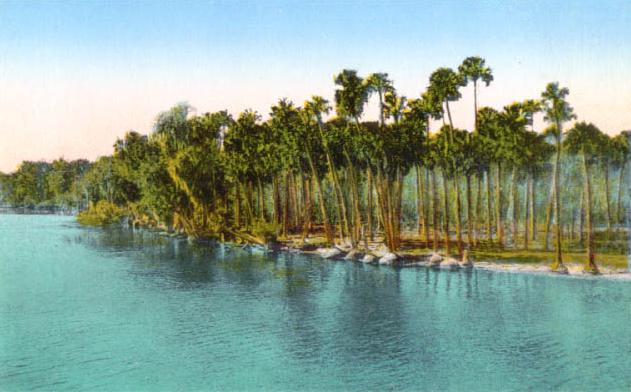
St. Johns River in c. 1915

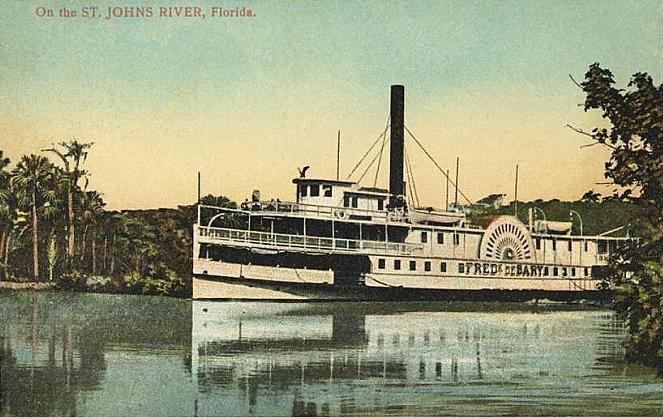
S.S. Frederick DeBary in 1910

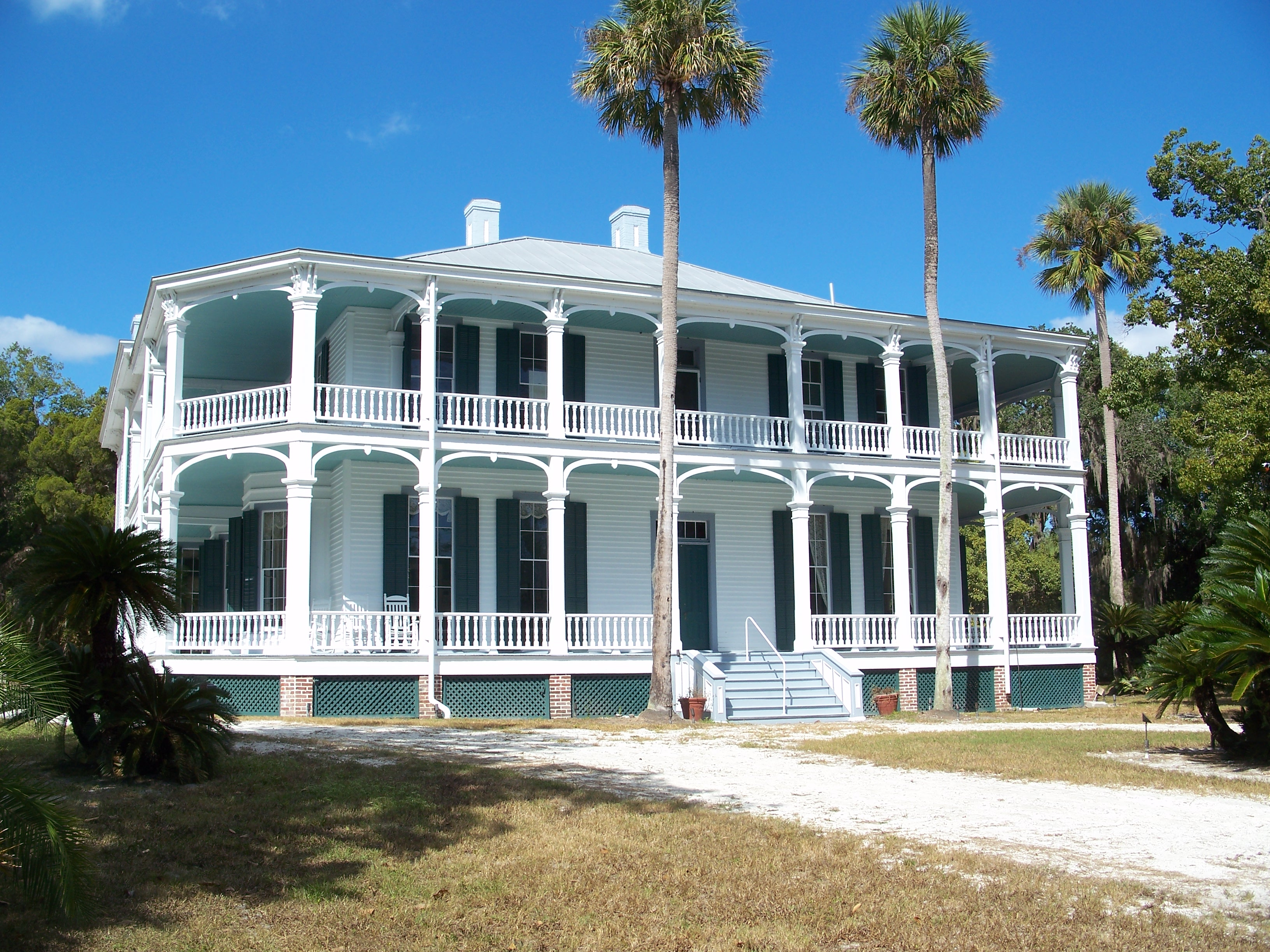
Historic DeBary Hall

DeBary is a city in Volusia County, Florida, United States, on the eastern shore of the St. Johns River near Lake Monroe. As of the 2020 census, DeBary had a population of 22,260. It is part of the Deltona–Daytona Beach–Ormond Beach, FL metropolitan statistical area, which was home to 553,284 people in 2019.

== History ==
The Timucuan Indians once lived in the vicinity of Lake Monroe, where the domain of Chief Utina extended to just north of Lake George. They hunted, fished, and gathered plants and berries from the forest. By 1760, however, the Timucua had disappeared and been replaced by the Seminole tribe from Alabama and Georgia. Florida was acquired from Spain in 1821, but the Seminole Wars delayed settlement. In 1866, Elijah Watson of Enterprise sold land to Oliver and Amanda Arnett on the northern shore of the St. Johns River at Lake Monroe, where they built a house.

The couple in turn sold 400 acres (1.6 km^{2}) in 1871 to (Samuel) Frederick deBary, a wealthy wine merchant from New York City, and that same year, he erected a hunting lodge. Called "DeBary Hall", the 8,000-sq-ft (700-m^{2}), 20-room Italianate mansion featured a two-tiered veranda, stables, an ice house, and the state's first swimming pool, fed by a spring. Visitors included Presidents Ulysses S. Grant and Grover Cleveland. Over time, he acquired an additional 9,000 acres (36 km^{2}), planting orange groves and pecan trees. Some debate remains as to whether this was actually the first pool in Florida, as a St. Augustine pool has also made the same claim. One possibility is that this was the first spring-fed pool in the state, In 1875, deBary bought a small steamboat, the George M. Bird, to transport his horses and dogs along the St. Johns River for hunting expeditions, and also to take fruit to market. He established the DeBary Merchants' Line in 1876, a steamship service contracted to carry mail between Jacksonville and Enterprise. It acquired the sidewheeler Frederick DeBary. In 1883, the firm merged with the Baya Line, owned by Colonel H.T. Baya, to create the DeBary-Baya Merchants' Line, with 13 steamboats and a crew of 3,000 running to Sanford. The DeBary-Baya Merchants' Line sold its business in 1889 to the Clyde Line, which survived until 1928.

Frederick deBary died in 1898, and his mansion is today a restored museum, listed on the National Register of Historic Places in 1972. The estate, reduced to 10 acres (40,000 m^{2}), now features the community's oldest building, the Arnett House. Incorporated in 1993, the City of DeBary is named for its noted settler.

== Geography ==
According to the United States Census Bureau, the city has a total area of 21.4 square miles (55 km^{2}), of which 18.2 square miles (47 km^{2}) are land and 3.2 square miles (8.3 km^{2}) (15.02%) are covered by water. Konomac Lake, a reservoir for Florida Power & Light, is located in the city. The geography of the city was heavily altered to dredge out Konomac Lake.

== Demographics ==
Historical population
Census	Pop.	Note	%±
1960	2,362		—
1970	3,154		33.5%
1980	4,980		57.9%
1990	7,176		44.1%
2000	15,559		116.8%
2010	19,320		24.2%
2020	22,260		15.2%
2025 (est.)	23,544		5.8%

=== Racial and ethnic composition ===
DeBary racial composition (Hispanics excluded from racial categories) (NH = Non-Hispanic)
Race	Pop 2010	Pop 2020	% 2010	% 2020
White (NH)	16,164	16,419	83.66%	73.76%
Black or African American (NH)	721	1,059	3.73%	4.76%
Native American or Alaska Native (NH)	47	52	0.24%	0.23%
Asian (NH)	358	493	1.85%	2.21%
Pacific Islander or Native Hawaiian (NH)	2	11	0.01%	0.05%
Some other race (NH)	37	123	0.19%	0.55%
Two or more races/Multiracial (NH)	235	857	1.22%	3.85%
Hispanic or Latino (any race)	1,756	3,246	9.09%	14.58%
Total	19,320	22,260		

=== 2020 census ===
As of the 2020 census, DeBary had a population of 22,260. The median age was 49.8 years. 17.8% of residents were under the age of 18 and 26.3% of residents were 65 years of age or older. For every 100 females there were 93.0 males, and for every 100 females age 18 and over there were 91.0 males age 18 and over.

95.5% of residents lived in urban areas, while 4.5% lived in rural areas.

There were 9,149 households in DeBary, of which 25.0% had children under the age of 18 living in them. Of all households, 54.6% were married-couple households, 14.9% were households with a male householder and no spouse or partner present, and 23.6% were households with a female householder and no spouse or partner present. About 24.2% of all households were made up of individuals and 13.7% had someone living alone who was 65 years of age or older.

There were 9,766 housing units, of which 6.3% were vacant. The homeowner vacancy rate was 2.1% and the rental vacancy rate was 10.5%.

Racial composition as of the 2020 census
Race	Number	Percent
White	17,237	77.4%
Black or African American	1,104	5.0%
American Indian and Alaska Native	67	0.3%
Asian	510	2.3%
Native Hawaiian and Other Pacific Islander	11	0.0%
Some other race	925	4.2%
Two or more races	2,406	10.8%
Hispanic or Latino (of any race)	3,246	14.6%

=== 2010 census ===
As of the 2010 United States census, there were 19,320 people, 7,955 households, and 5,634 families residing in the city.

In 2010, the population density was 1,018 inhabitants per square mile (393/km^{2}). The population was distributed as 20.0% under the age of 18, 4.9% from 18 to 24, 24.9% from 25 to 44, 27.2% from 45 to 64, and 23.0% who were 65 years of age or older. The median age was 45 years. For every 100 females, there were 92.1 males. For every 100 females age 18 and over, there were 88.3 males.

== Public transportation ==
=== Bus ===
DeBary is served by VOTRAN's #23,#31, #32, and #33 routes.

=== Rail ===
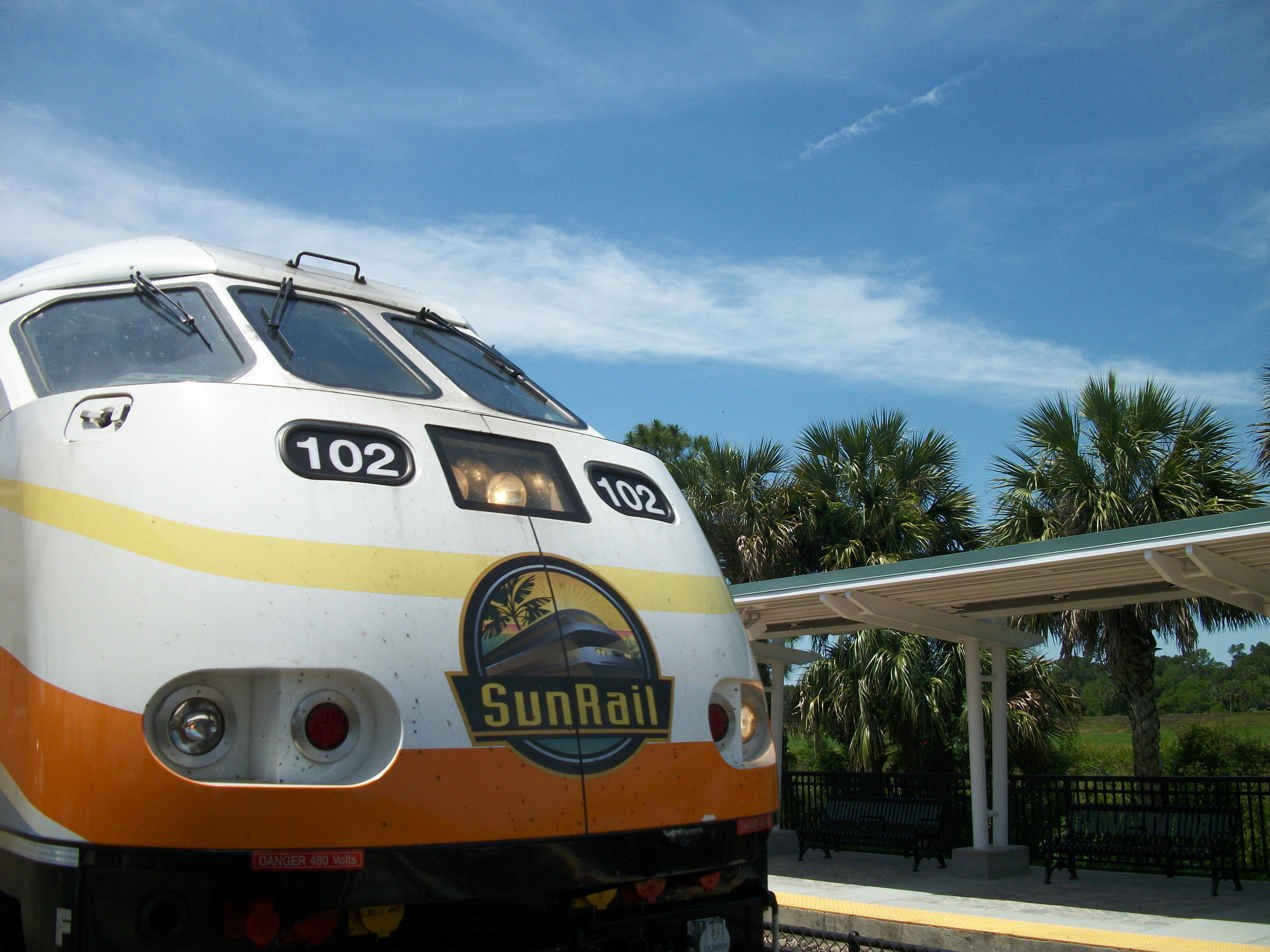
SunRail commuter train at DeBary Station

DeBary is served by SunRail, the Central Florida commuter rail system.

== Parks and recreation ==
DeBary boasts several large parks and open land, each serving several outdoor activities.

City parks

- Alexander Island Park (Opening in 2027)
- Alexandra Park
- Bill Keller Park
- Community Park
- Eagle's Nest Park
- Gateway Park
- Memorial Park
- Power Park
- River City Nature Park
- Rob Sullivan Park

Volusia County parks

- DeBary Hall
- Gemini Springs Park
- Lake Monroe Park

== Notable people ==
- Luke Delaney (born 1979), astronaut
- Jalyx Hunt (born 2001), NFL player
- Louise Hurrell (born 1871), physician
- Perry Moss (born 1926), NFL player and coach

== Education ==
Public primary and secondary education is handled by Volusia County Schools. The one elementary school in DeBary is DeBary Elementary. Students attend middle and high schools in the nearby cities of Deltona and Orange City.
