= Enterprise, Florida =

Enterprise Benson Springs
- Unincorporated community
- Enterprise
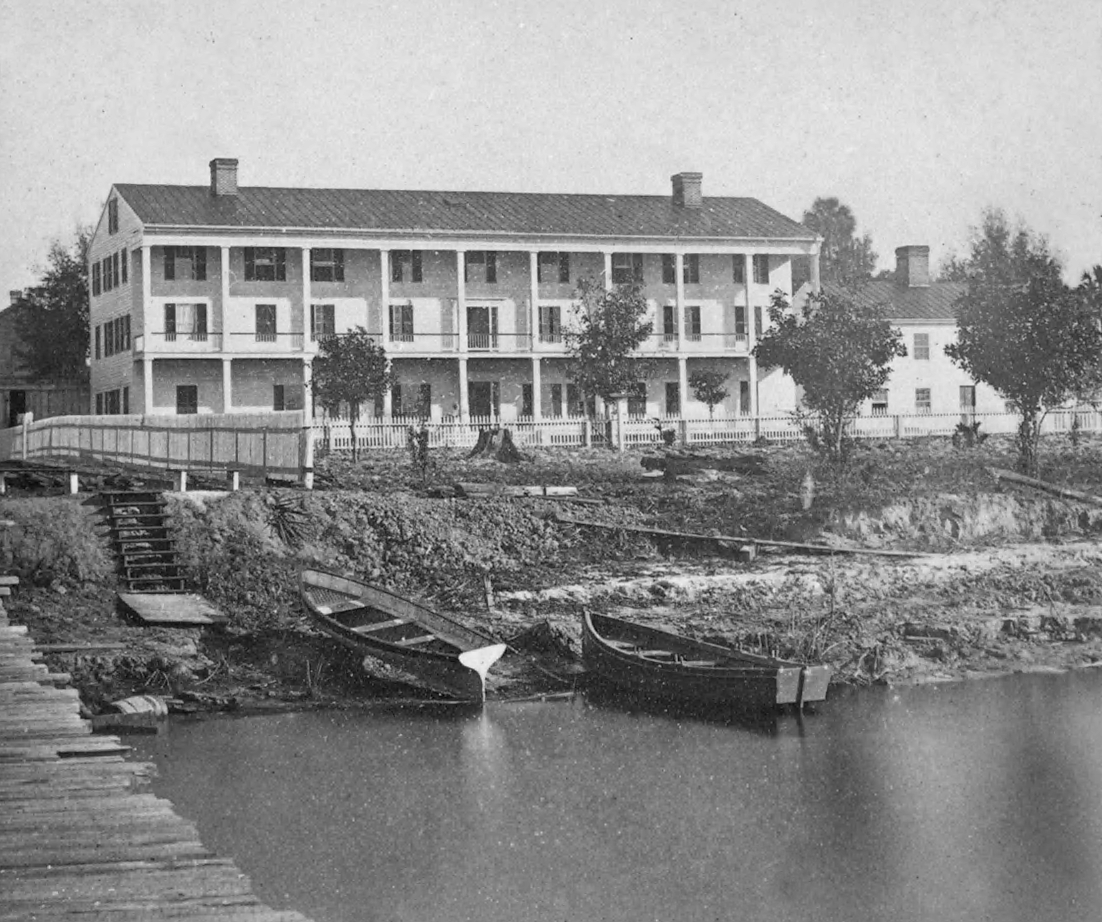
- Brock House in Enterprise, Florida, c. 1875

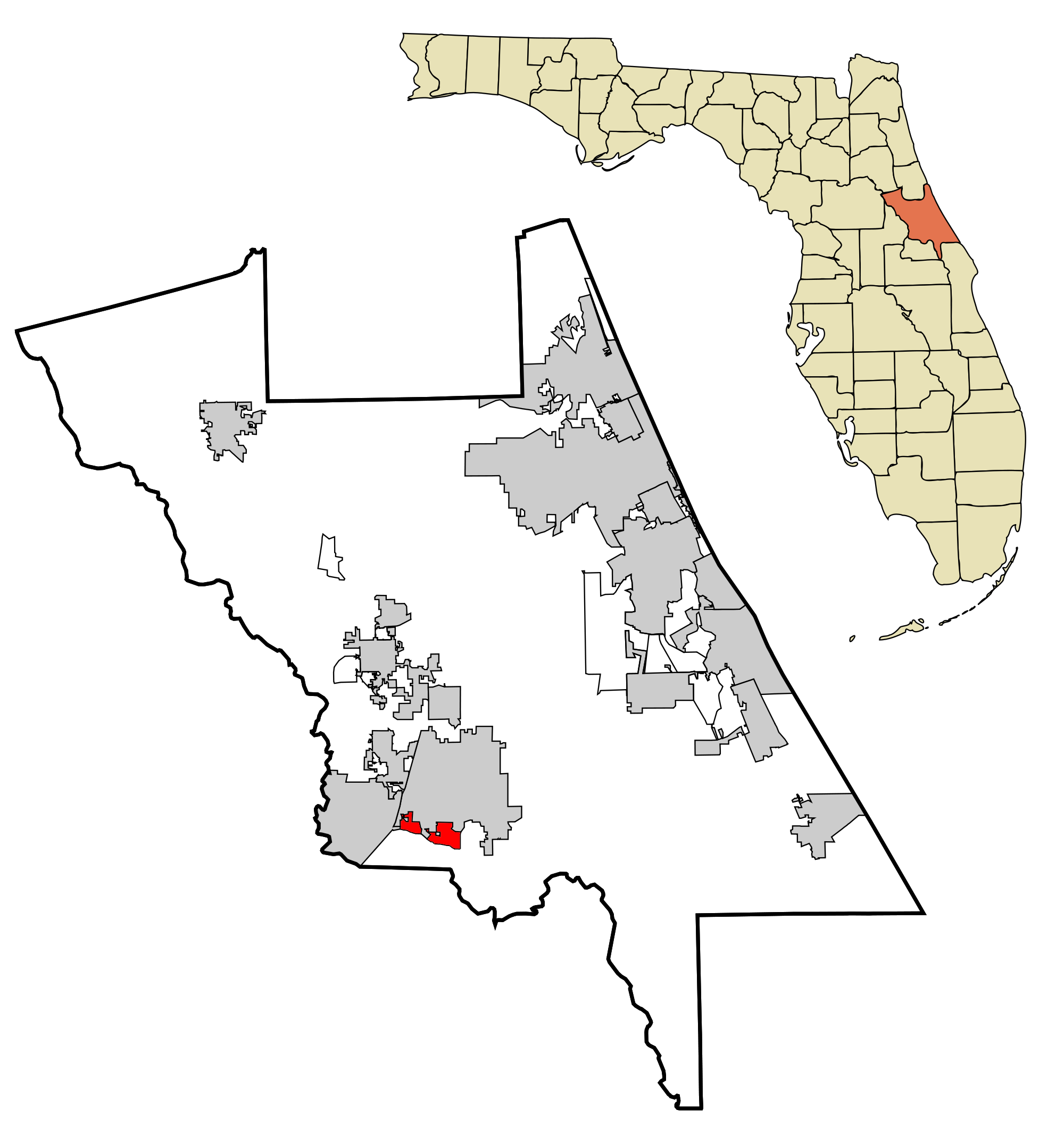
- Location in Volusia County and the state of Florida
- Coordinates: 28°52′09″N 81°16′00″W
- Country: United States
- State: Florida
- County: Volusia
- Elevation: 20 ft (6 m)
- Time zone: UTC-5 (EST)
  - Summer (DST): UTC-4 (EDT)
- ZIP code(s): 32725
- Area code: 386
- GNIS feature ID: 282231

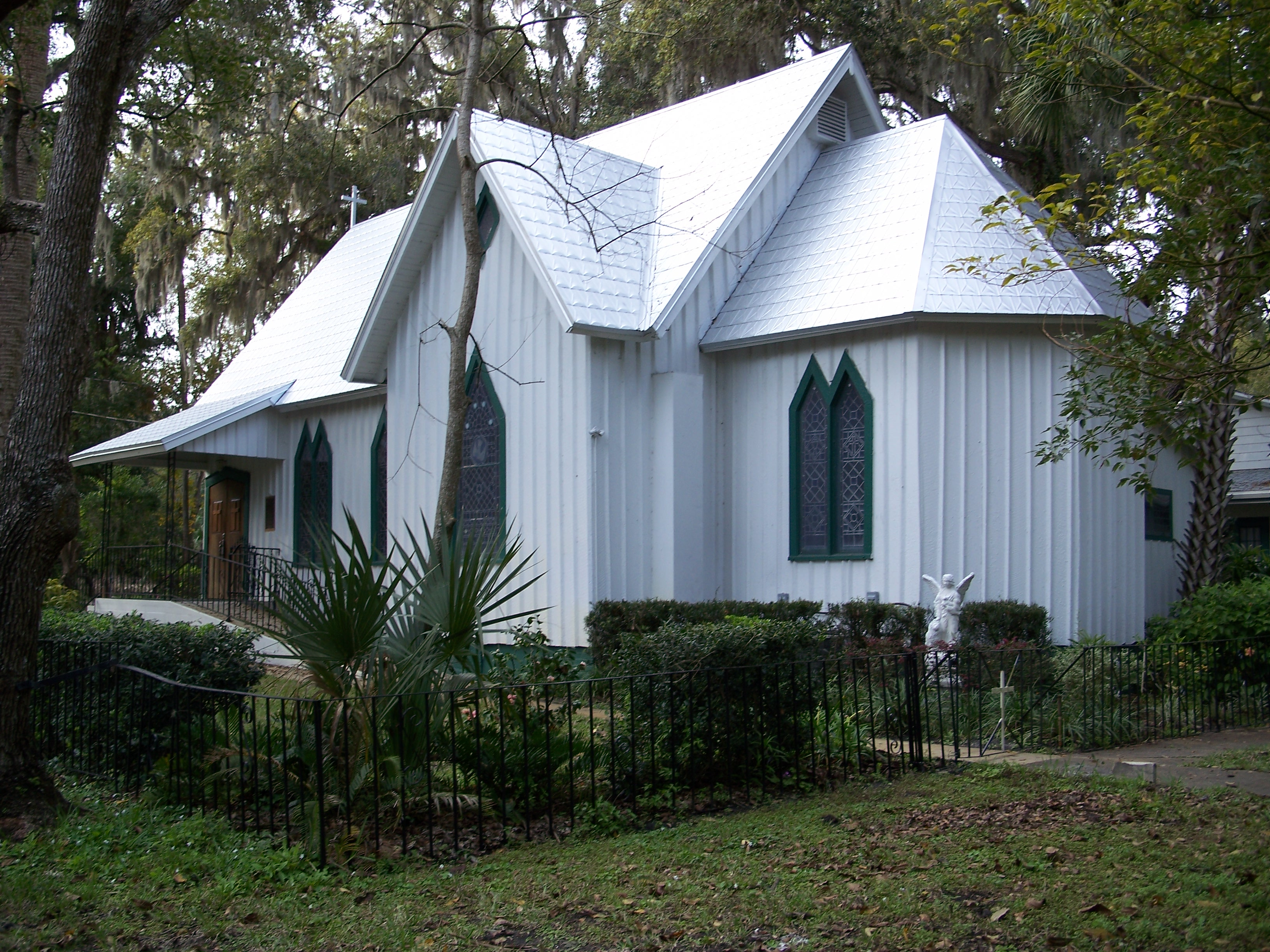
All Saints Episcopal Church

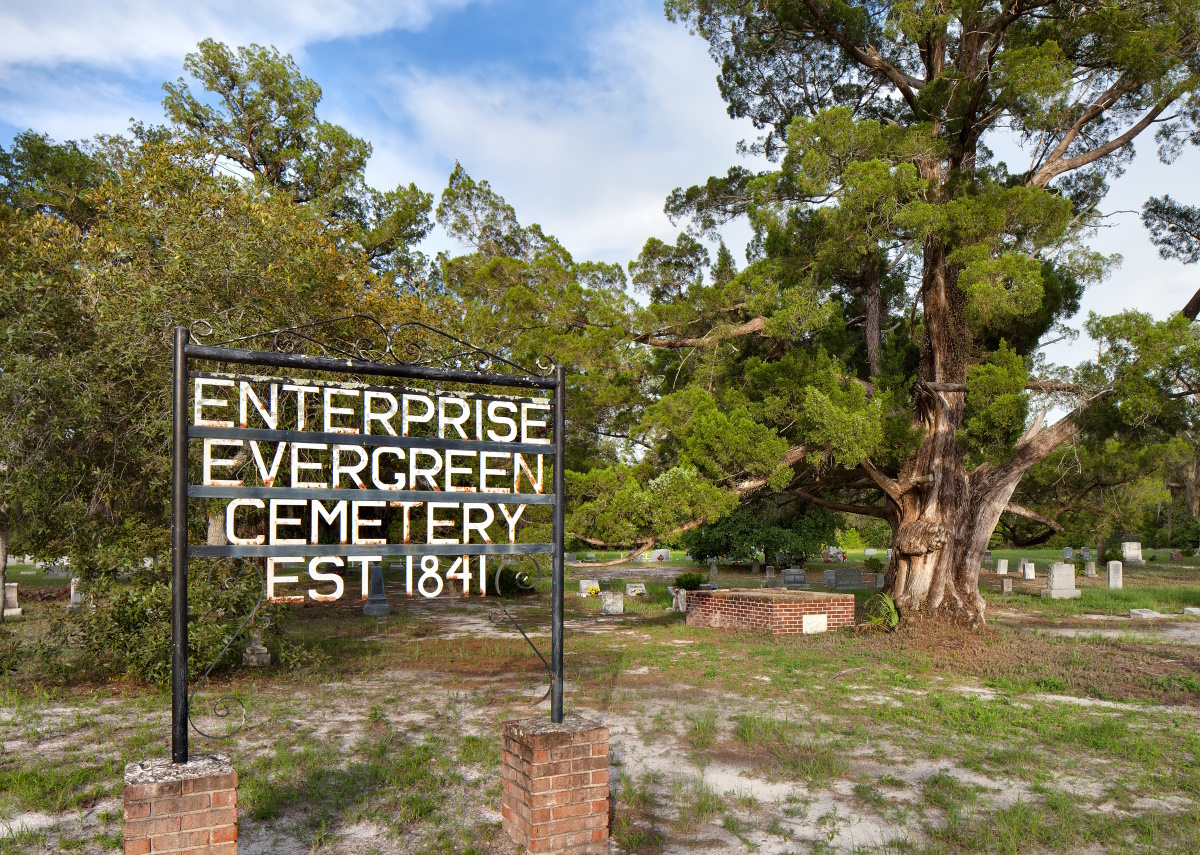
Enterprise Evergreen Cemetery - Established in 1841

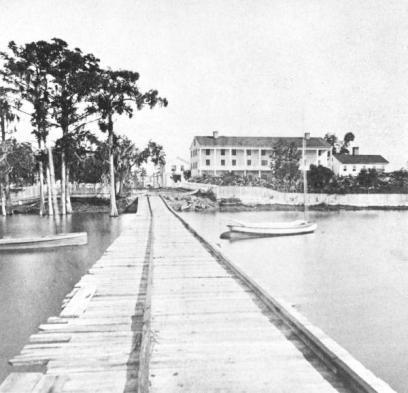
The Brock House in 1876

Enterprise is an unincorporated community in Volusia County, in the U.S. state of Florida, and its former county seat. Situated on the northern shore of Lake Monroe, it is flanked by the cities of DeBary and Deltona. Enterprise was once the head of navigation on the St. Johns River and at various times, the county seat for three different counties: Mosquito, which was renamed as Orange; and lastly, for Volusia, which was formed from part of Orange County.

In 2006, Volusia County government approved a historic overlay which designates Enterprise as an "area of special concern" as a historic village. This establishes a defined historic district within the community and ensures that any development must follow strict guidelines.

== History ==
=== Early ===
In 1565, Pedro Menéndez de Avilés explored the St. Johns River, perhaps reaching Lake Monroe. At the time of contact with Europeans, the area was home to the Mayaca Indians, who lived in small villages. They collected snails and shellfish, hunted turtles, deer and alligators, and gathered roots, nuts and berries for food. The Enterprise midden or shell mound accumulated over thousands of years from the debris of cooking and toolmaking by the ancestors of the Mayaca. Beginning in the First Spanish Period, Florida Indians fell victim to European diseases, forced labor, missionization, and slave raids from the English militia of the Carolinas allied with invading tribes from the north. By the 1760s, Florida's native cultures, including the Mayaca, Timucua, Apalachee, Ais, Surruque, Calusa, and Tequesta, had been decimated. Later called Seminoles, Indians from Alabama and Georgia moved in to fill the void left by native Florida tribes.

=== Nineteenth century ===
Following the acquisition of Florida by the United States in 1821, the Seminole had conflicts with encroaching settlers and troops throughout the Seminole Wars, when the United States tried to remove the Seminole to Indian Territory. In 1835, the Seminole burned Palatka, a major port on the St. Johns River, then the major artery into Central Florida. Consequently, the US built Fort Kingsbury, a stockade defense, in 1838 at Enterprise in the area of what is now Thornby Park, across the lake from Fort Mellon, built in 1836 at Mellonville (now Sanford).

To displace the Seminole, in 1842 Congress passed the Armed Occupation Act, granting 160 acres (0.65 km^{2}) to settlers who would clear, cultivate and hold 5 acres (20,000 m^{2}) for five years. Over 200,000 acres (800 km^{2}) south of Palatka were opened for development. One of more than 1,000 who applied was Cornelius Taylor from San Pablo (now Mayport), a former timber agent and first cousin to General Zachary Taylor. In 1841, he and about 20 others founded "Enterprise" at Fort Kingsbury, which had been abandoned after six weeks, and filed for homestead the next year.

Taylor built an inn atop the shell midden to attract visitors traveling by shallow-draft steamboat from Palatka, the furthest upstream that ocean-going vessels could navigate. Orange groves were planted, and a gristmill established, together with a sawmill to cut southern live oak, prized by the U.S. Navy for warships. In 1843, Enterprise became county seat of "Mosquito County". The latter was renamed as "Orange County" in 1845, and the county seat was moved to Mellonville. An epidemic believed to be smallpox claimed Taylor's oldest daughter and nine of his slaves in 1842, and he left in 1847.

In 1851, Jacob Brock bought land a mile west of the original settlement, where he built a wharf and laid out streets and lots. A steamboat captain with "a notable reputation for the lavish and original nature of his profanity", he had transported to Enterprise many invalids seeking the climate and sulfur springs, which were believed to be curative for a variety of ailments. In 1854, he completed The Brock House, a 2 1/2-story hotel with accommodations for more than 50. That year Volusia County was organized from territory of Orange County, and Enterprise was designated as its county seat. Brock operated the first regular steamboat passenger service from Jacksonville to Palatka, expanding to Enterprise.

It was a 206-mile (332 km) trip aboard the Darlington, which departed Jacksonville at 8:00 AM on Saturday, timed to receive passengers discharged from ocean-going ships. It would arrive and spend Sunday in Palatka, from which it departed at 5:00 AM on Monday morning, docking at Enterprise that evening. Only by daylight did prudent captains navigate the narrow, crooked upper part of the St. Johns River. Crew members had to watch for snakes, slithering aboard out of Spanish moss in overhanging trees, and also for alligators, which the crew shot before the reptiles could tangle with the paddlewheel. Soon, an additional danger would imperil the waterway—the Civil War.

The South Atlantic Blockading Squadron division commanded by Union Captain George Balch set out to capture Confederate steamboats on the St. Johns River. Seized at Lake Monroe on March 14, 1864, was the Hattie Brock, named for the captain's daughter, and loaded with 150 bales of cotton for export to help finance the rebel cause. It was towed to Brock's wharf to load wood fuel. From the veranda of The Brock House, the New York Tribune would report, Miss Brock expressed grief and indignation at the capture of her namesake by the Yankees. The marines were reportedly glad to get away as soon as their boats were supplied. They took with them from Enterprise two black males, probably slaves, and three black females, as well as 2,000 pounds of sugar from a refinery. They demolished the mill, located about 2 miles (3.2 km) farther downriver on the east side of DeBary Creek.

Following the rebellion, the state experienced a boom in tourism, and Enterprise became a fashionable resort and sportsmen's paradise for fish and game. "No dreamland on earth", wrote Harriet Beecher Stowe in 1873, "can be more unearthly in its beauty and glory than the St. Johns in April." Sold and renovated in 1876, The Brock House was the most famous hotel in the state, with Northern guests including President Ulysses S. Grant, President Grover Cleveland, General William Sherman, Jay Gould and members of the Vanderbilt family. Others came from England, France and South America. In 1877, Enterprise was incorporated.

Another notable visitor was (Samuel) Frederick deBary of New York City, a wealthy importer of champagne and other French wines. After staying at The Brock House in 1870, he would buy 400 acres (1.6 km^{2}) to the west in 1871 and build DeBary Hall, a mansion and hunting lodge. Acquiring much more land, deBary planted orange groves and pecan trees. In 1876, he established the DeBary Merchants Line, a steamship company contracted to carry mail from Jacksonville to Enterprise. He contributed money to build the Gothic Revival All Saints Episcopal Church, completed in 1883. It was listed on the National Register of Historic Places in 1974.

The Atlantic Coast, St. Johns & Indian River Railroad in 1885 linked Titusville with Enterprise, from which ran a spur line to the Jacksonville, Tampa and Key West Railway at Enterprise Junction in present-day DeBary. But in 1888, Florida experienced an epidemic of yellow fever. The population of Enterprise dwindled, and DeLand became the county seat. The freezes of 1894 and 1895 wiped out the citrus industry in much of the state, including the deBary groves. Enterprise voted to de-incorporate in 1895. Its distinctive midden, once featured on the city seal, would disappear, as well as the shells used to pave streets and sidewalks.

=== Twentieth and twenty-first centuries ===
In 1924, the George E. Turner Power Plant was built near the shore of Lake Monroe. Around this time, the Methodist Church organized and was named after a popular preacher named Rev. Barnett. The town was renamed "Benson Springs" in about 1924, a change petitioned by the owner, employees and guests of the Benson Springs Hotel. Never popular, the name "Benson Springs" changed back to "Enterprise" in 1937, the year the deteriorating hotel was razed to increase room for the 'Florida United Methodist Children's Home. The Florida East Coast Railway branch was abandoned in the 1950s, its track removed in the 1970s. Dismantling the George E. Turner Power Plant began in 2007, and was completed in February 2008.

Today, Enterprise struggles not to be absorbed by Deltona. In 2000, The Enterprise Preservation Society, inc. (EPS) was established to protect the rural character and history of Enterprise, and to prevent annexation into Deltona. EPS was helpful in obtaining protections from Volusia County, including designation as a Community of Special Interest, implementation of the Enterprise Local Area Plan, which establishes additional landscape and architectural standards, and finally the designation of the Enterprise Historic District, encompassing several blocks of the historic downtown area. In 2003, Enterprise Elementary School Building #8 was slated for Demolition, but instead was deeded to EPS. In 2007, with the help of a Volusia ECHO grant, EPS hired Youngblood & Sons to move the building to a vacant property at 360 Main Street, donated to EPS by Sandra and Roy Walters of Enterprise. Following Several years of renovation and thousands of hours of volunteer work, it reopened as the Enterprise Heritage Center & Museum in October, 2014.

== See also ==
- Green Springs Park
