= All Saints Episcopal Church (Enterprise, Florida) =

Historic church in Florida, United States

- U.S. National Register of Historic Places
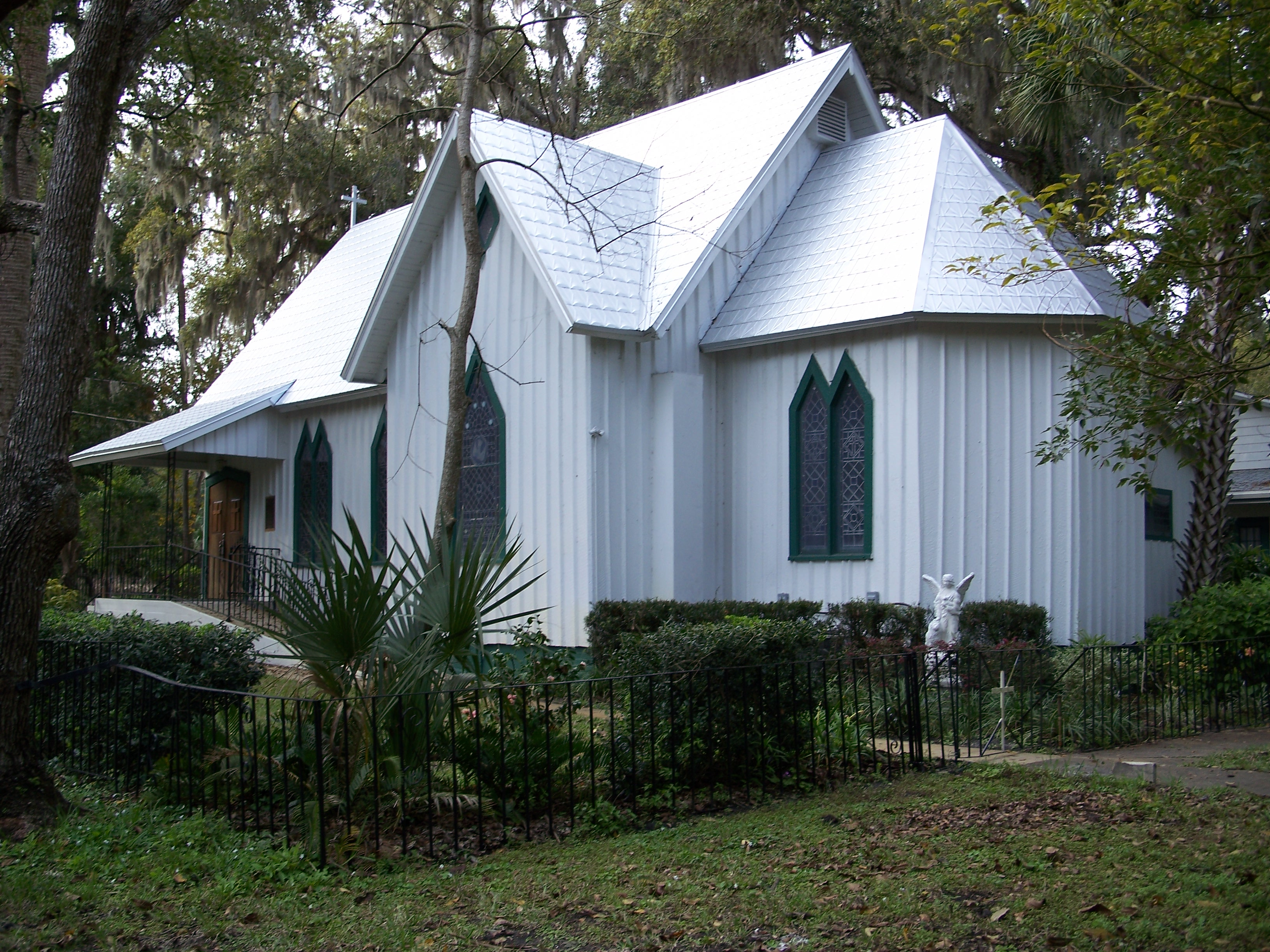

- Location within Florida Location within the United States
- Location: Enterprise, Florida, United States
- Coordinates: 28°52′10″N 81°16′10″W
- Built: 1883
- Architectural style: Gothic Revival
- NRHP reference No.: 74000656
- Added to NRHP: May 3, 1974

The All Saints Episcopal Church is an historic Carpenter Gothic church located at 155 Clark Street in Enterprise, Florida, United States. On May 3, 1974, it was added to the U.S. National Register of Historic Places.
