= Glenwood Historic District =

Glenwood Historic District may refer to:

- Glenwood Historic District (Thomasville, Georgia), listed on the National Register of Historic Places (NRHP) in Thomas County
- Glenwood Historic District (Chattanooga, Tennessee), NRHP-listed in Hamilton County
- Glenwood Historic District (Clarksville, Tennessee), NRHP-listed in Montgomery County

== See also ==
- Glenwood (disambiguation)
