= Glenwood, Florida =

Glenwood
- Unincorporated community
- Location within Volusia County
- Coordinates: 29°05′10″N 81°21′15″W
- Country: United States
- State: Florida
- County: Volusia
- Elevation: 85 ft (26 m)
- Time zone: UTC-5 (Eastern (EST))
  - Summer (DST): UTC-4 (EDT)
- Area code: 386
- GNIS feature ID: 283118

Glenwood is a small unincorporated community in West Volusia County, Florida. It developed as an orange growing agricultural and lumber industry community. It is now home to a trail and a group home residential community. It is popular for birding and borders Lake Woodruff National Wildlife Refuge.

== History ==
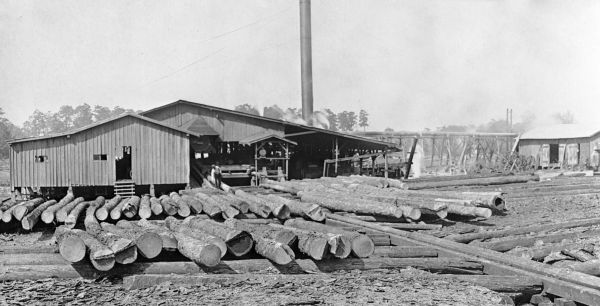
Bond's Mill in Glenwood, circa 1925

In 1879 H.E. Hamlin discovered a seedling in his orange grove in Glenwood that he named "Hamlin". It became the most widely grown variety in Florida. Horticulturalist A.J Kinsley of Benton Harbor, Michigan who was also active in Chicago seems to have spent time in Glenwood.

Rail connections brought development to Glenwood as sawmills and citrus industries were established. The area developed a sizable African American community and included the Mount Olive AME Church established in 1883. St. Johns Missionary Baptist Church was adjacent and the road past them was named Church Street.

The Glenwood African American Cemetery was established in 1885. The once abandoned cemetery, located at 2155 Guava Street, includes gravesites of World War I veterans and was cleaned up by volunteers in 2015.

The Bond Lumber Company in Glenwood was operating in 1891 and advertised yellow pines and cypress products in a 1902 edition of Florida Magazine.

In 1911, Lumber businessman Jacob B. Conrad had mills in Deland and Glenwood. In 1922 Cypress Co., a lumber operation, incorporated in Glenwood with $100,000 in capital. The company seems to be referred to elsewhere as the Volusia Cypress Company.

Glenwood's entry in Lippincott's New Gazetteer published in 1916 describes it as a post-village of Volusia with a population of about 200 and notes its banking is carried out in DeLand, Florida.

The Spring to Spring Trail passes through the town, with a trailhead on Grand Avenue.
