= Glenwood, Floyd County, Georgia =

Unincorporated community in Georgia, U.S.

Coordinates: 34°18′44″N 85°10′20″W

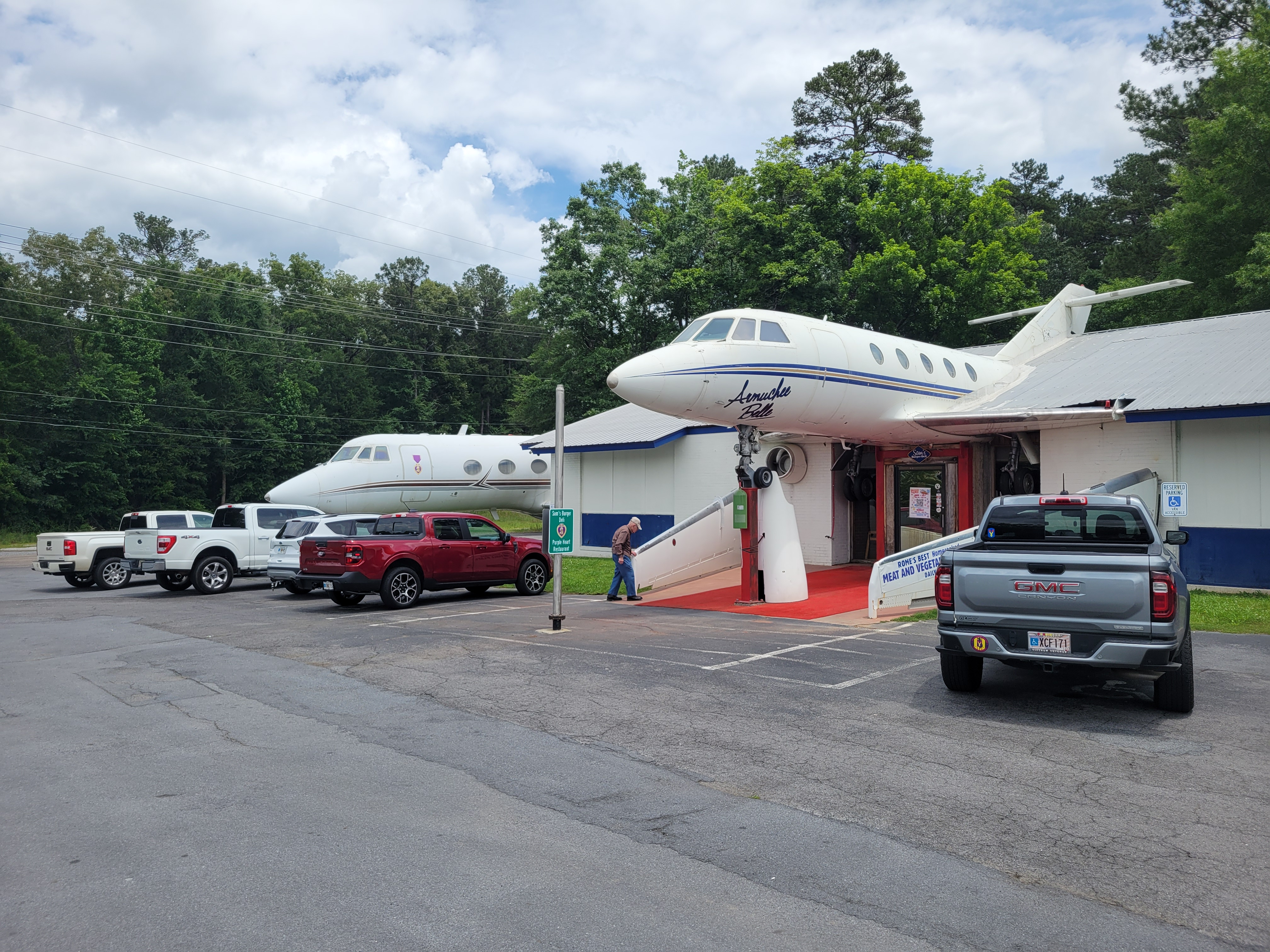
Sam's Burger Deli

Glenwood is an unincorporated community in Floyd County, in the U.S. state of Georgia.

== History ==
Glenwood took its name from the nearby estate of Augustus Wright.
