= Glenwood, Virginia =

Unincorporated community in Virginia, US

Coordinates: 36.58875°N 79.36613°W

Glenwood is an unincorporated community in Pittsylvania County, in the U.S. state of Virginia.
