= Glenwood Cemetery =

Glenwood Cemetery may refer to: (sorted by state, then city/town)

- Glenwood Cemetery (Huntsville, Alabama), historic cemetery for African American burials
- Glenwood Cemetery (Washington, D.C.)
- Glenwood Cemetery (Maynard, Massachusetts), listed on the National Register of Historic Places (NRHP) in Middlesex County, Massachusetts
- Glenwood Cemetery (Flint, Michigan), listed on the NRHP in Genesee County, Michigan
- Glenwood Cemetery (Yazoo, Mississippi)
- Glenwood Cemetery (Vernon Township, New Jersey)
- Glenwood Cemetery (Watertown, Jefferson, New York)
- Glenwood Cemetery (Watkins Glen, New York)
- Glenwood Cemetery (Houston, Texas)
- Glenwood Cemetery (Park City, Utah), on the National Register of Historic Places listings for Summit County, Utah
- Glenwood Memorial Gardens (Broomall, Pennsylvania), originally called Glenwood Cemetery
