= Glenwood (Troy, New York) =

Historic house in New York, United States

- U.S. National Register of Historic Places
- Location within New York Location within the United States
- Location: Eddy's Lane, Troy, New York
- Coordinates: 42°45′4″N 73°40′33″W
- Area: less than one acre
- Architectural style: Greek Revival
- NRHP reference No.: 73001254
- Added to NRHP: May 25, 1973

Glenwood, also known as Eddy Titus Mansion, is a historic home located on Eddy's Lane in Troy in Rensselaer County, New York. The house consists of a 2 1/2-story, rectangular, red brick central block with a two-story, T-shaped wing. The wing forms a courtyard and there is a one-story porch around three sides of it. The front facade is dominated by a full Ionic order portico with pediment in the Greek Revival style. It houses the offices of the Troy Housing Authority.

It was listed on the National Register of Historic Places in 1973.
