= Laidley-Summers-Quarrier House =

Historic house in West Virginia, United States

- U.S. National Register of Historic Places
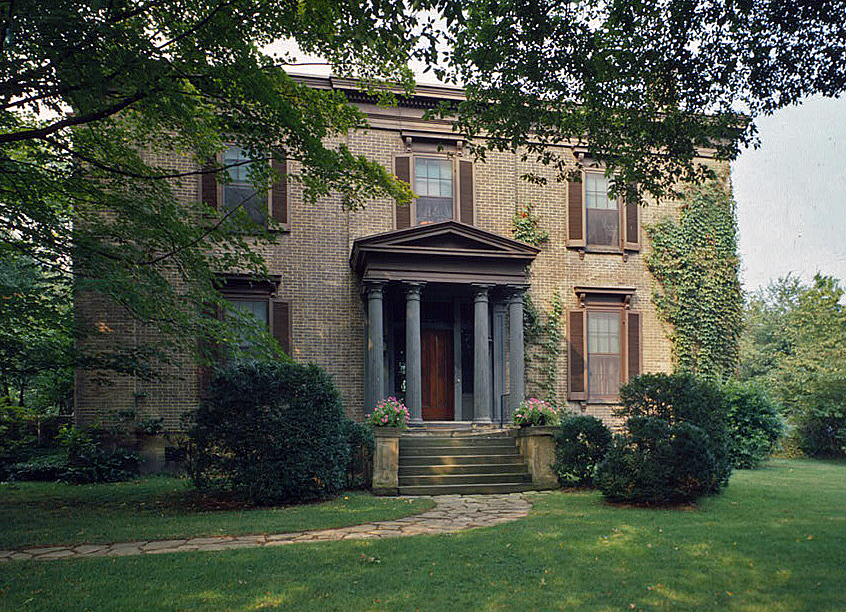
- Laidley-Summers-Quarrier House in 1979

- Location within West Virginia Location within the United States
- Location: 800 Orchard St., Charleston, West Virginia
- Coordinates: 38°22′6″N 81°39′2″W
- Built: 1852
- Architect: William Preston
- Architectural style: Greek Revival
- NRHP reference No.: 78002802
- Added to NRHP: December 13, 1978

Laidley-Summers-Quarrier House, also known as Glenwood, is a historic home located at Charleston, West Virginia. It is a two-story gable roofed dwelling in the Greek Revival style and built in 1852.

It was listed on the National Register of Historic Places in 1978.
