= Glenwood, Kitsap County, Washington =

Unincorporated community in Washington, United States

- Unincorporated community
- Location within Washington (state) Location within the United States
- Coordinates: 47°25′30″N 122°41′21″W
- Country: United States
- State: Washington
- County: Kitsap
- Elevation: 354 ft (108 m)
- Time zone: UTC-8 (Pacific (PST))
  - Summer (DST): UTC-7 (PDT)
- Area code(s): 360, 564
- GNIS feature ID: 1510995

Glenwood is an unincorporated community in Kitsap County, Washington, United States. Glenwood is 10 miles (16 km) south of Bremerton.
