= Glenwood, Whitman County, Washington =

Unincorporated community in Washington, United States

Glenwood, Washington
- Unincorporated community
- Location within Washington (state)
- Coordinates: 46°55′40″N 117°16′48″W
- Country: United States
- State: Washington
- County: Whitman
- Elevation: 2,077 ft (633 m)
- Time zone: UTC-8 (Pacific (PST))
  - Summer (DST): UTC-7 (PDT)
- Area code: 509
- GNIS feature ID: 1510994

Glenwood is an unincorporated community in Whitman County, Washington, United States. Glenwood is located on the north fork of the Palouse River 5 miles (8.0 km) northeast of Colfax.

The community was named for the glen and woods near the original town site.
