= DeBary Hall =

- U.S. National Register of Historic Places
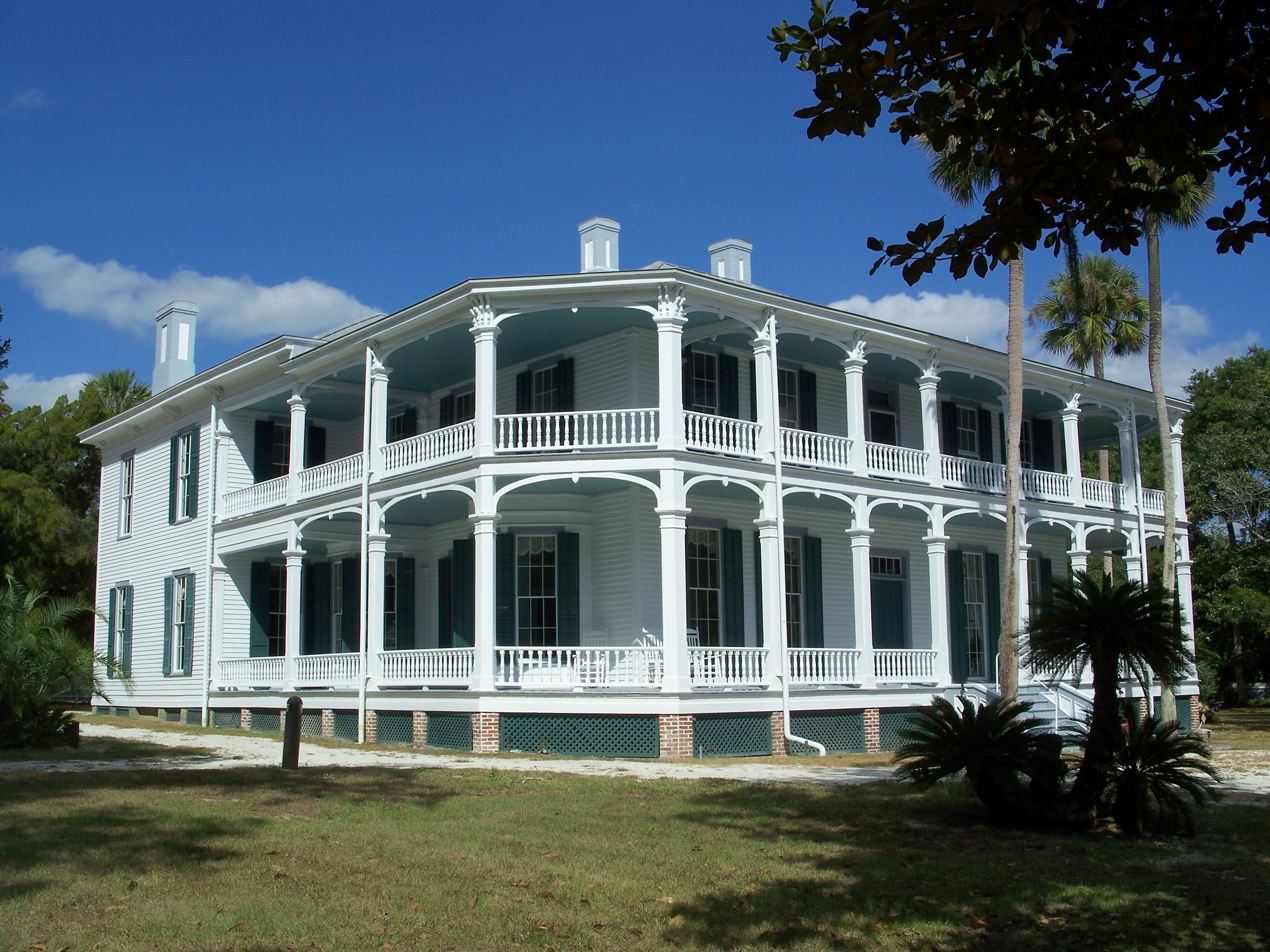

- Location within Florida Location within the United States
- Interactive map showing the location of DeBary Hall
- Location: DeBary, Florida
- Coordinates: 28°52′29″N 81°17′50″W
- Built: 1871
- NRHP reference No.: 72000354
- Added to NRHP: July 24, 1972

DeBary Hall is a historic site in DeBary, Florida, United States. It is located at 198 Sunrise Boulevard. On July 24, 1972, it was added to the U.S. National Register of Historic Places. Frederick DeBary was a wine importer for Mumms Champagne and built DeBary Hall in 1871 as his hunting retreat along the St. John’s River in central Florida. The area offered various leisure activities such as swimming in the local springs, fishing, and hunting quail, deer, and alligator.

DeBary turned his leisure site into a profitable enterprise when he planted over 600 acres (2.4 km^{2}) of citrus trees and began a steamboat company for trade up the St. John’s River to Jacksonville. The DeBarys used the hall as their family winter retreat until 1941, when the last American DeBary, Leonie deBary Lyon Brewster, died suddenly without an heir.

The area attracted many guests, and those that stayed at DeBary Hall required a personal invitation. Several additions and renovations were made to the house to accommodate the numerous guests. The additions included a second dining room, a wrap-around porch, two extra bathrooms, and three extra guest bedrooms. The Florida springs, hunting, and warm climate appealed to people across the nation and internationally. Guests to DeBary Hall may have included Presidents Grant and Cleveland, European Royalty, and General William Tecumseh Sherman.

The building was constructed during Reconstruction. It features several advanced attributes atypical of Southern homes during this meager time period. The 8,000 sq ft (740 m^{2}) hunting lodge included an elevator for guests’ luggage, running water through a 500-gallon tank in the ceiling, wall-fed electricity made onsite by natural gas, a wired call system throughout the entire house, and a lightning protection system that covered the roof of this amazingly advanced home. The site also included a water tower and Florida’s first spring-fed swimming pool, which used a pump to fill and drain the pool each day. These unique features kept the residents self-sufficient at the mostly remote estate. The unique architectural features of the home serve as the main significance for the National Register of Historic Places designation.

== Frederick DeBary ==
Samuel Frederick deBary was born January 12, 1815, at Frankfurt-am-Main in Germany. As a young man, Frederick befriended G. H. Mumm, whose family produced brands of champagne in Rheims. Mumms proposed that deBary go to New York City and introduce the family's champagne to America. At 25, deBary sailed to New York in 1840 to introduce Mumm's Champagne to the new wealthy class of merchants, manufacturers, financiers and professional men profiting from New York's growing port.

Once in New York, deBary organized an importing firm, Frederick deBary Company, strictly for Mumm's Champagne. Because luxury items were not yet predominately produced in America, deBary found much success. In 1844, deBary returned to Europe and married Julie Scherpenhauser. The couple permanently moved to New York and had two children, Adolphe and Eugenie. Eugenie later married a German and returned to Europe. Her children created the only descendants of Frederick deBary, where the family is now again solely European.

== The DeBarys in Florida ==
Frederick DeBary's wife Julie died in 1868. After her death, the widower ventured on a steamboat ride down the St. John's River in Florida. The quiet natural setting appealed to deBary. In January 1871, Frederick deBary bought three parcels of land from Oliver and Amanda Arnett. The property abutted Lake Monroe with a grove of live oaks and green pines. The large home soon became the Winter retreat of deBary and his relatives and friends. Hunting parties left the house very early in the morning with breakfast for the hunters served at four-thirty in the morning. deBary arrived in Florida each year at the end of December or early January. He typically came with a crowd of guests. DeBary Hall served as an active hunting and fishing preserve during the mild Florida winters.

As an always eager entrepreneur, Frederick DeBary turned his winter retreat into a profitable venture. He amassed over 10,000 acres (40 km^{2}) and planted orange groves. He built a packing house beside the lake pier and was one of the first citrus growers to sort oranges by size by rolling them down an inclined trough with variously sized holes. deBary also joined the profitable steamboat trade developing the DeBary Merchants Line. The steamboats ran from Jacksonville to Enterprise along the St. John's River. Until 1889, most of the steamers along the St. John's would be deBary boats.

Frederick deBary died on December 23, 1898. His citrus trees had been decimated by hard freezes and the steamboat industry was gradually being taken over by the faster railroad industry. His son, Adolphe and daughter, Eugenie inherited DeBary Hall and the other five estates deBary accumulated through the years. DeBary Hall is thought to be the smallest of all six homes owned by Frederick deBary. Eugenie moved to Germany with her husband Baron Hugo Von Mauch before her ninetieth birthday. Adolphe deBary was fifty-three years old at the time of his father's death and ascended to his father's place in the importing firm and the DeBary Merchant Line. Adolphe also inherited his father's love for horses and hunting. Adolphe kept no less than six horses in the stable. He also kept a collection of vehicles including a brougham, a surrey, a phaeton, a brake cart, and pony carts for children. Adolphe DeBary outlived all four of his children. Upon his death in 1928, DeBary Hall passed to his grandchildren Leonie deBary Lyon and Adolphe deBary Lyon.

Leonie and Adolphe were minors when their grandfather died, and the deBary estate was placed in a trust for them guarded by their father Cecil Lyon. Leonie and Adolphe became the last American deBary heirs as both died early. Adolphe deBary Lyon graduated in 1935 from Harvard College. On September 19, 1937, Adolphe went to a party with a group of friends. As the party left, a young woman began to cross a street and did not notice a car driving towards her. Adolphe saw it and rushed in front of the car, pushing the young woman out of the way and was struck. He died at twenty-three years old. His sister Leonie became the sole owner of DeBary Hall with her husband, Benjamin Brewster, a childhood friend. Leonie made more renovations to the family home than any previous owner including putting in a tennis court, new flooring, and a larger bathroom in the Master Suite. The biggest change however was transportation to DeBary Hall. Leonie and her husband were flight enthusiasts and constructed a runway and an airplane hangar on the property.

On May 9, 1941, Leonie and Benjamin planned to fly from Long Island to Philadelphia. The weather conditions were not suitable for flight but the couple insisted and did not heed to the warnings. In the blinding rain the plane crashed into the side of a mountain killing the young couple instantly. Leonie was thirty-one and had no children.

== 1942–1990 ==
Leonie deBary Lyon Brewster's sudden death left confusion to the ownership of DeBary Hall and her other inherited properties. Her will stipulated that her properties be split between her Lyon family cousins and her deBary German relatives. There was little interest from either family to acquire Debary Hall and a Lyon family member began selling off the 6,000-acre (24 km^{2}) property. According to a Volusia County deed, a P. V. Proctor purchased all the deBary land in 1942. Mr. Proctor moved out most of the deBary furnishing, leaving few original pieces. Proctor sold most of the deBary land to the Paco Land Company. The Paco Land Company in turn sold a portion of the property to George Stedronsky, a Northerner with hopes of creating a retirement community in Florida. He lived in the Hall for about a year. In late 1947, Mr. Stedronsky sold his plans to Plantation Estates, Incorporated, a land developing firm. DeBary Hall became part of "Plantation Estates" and much of the surrounding land became individual lots with small houses. DeBary Hall became the club house to the Plantation Estates.

DeBary Hall then passed to the senior citizens of the community. At seventy years old, the house was in disrepair. The new owners were in search of an owner who could restore the Hall. In 1959, the Florida Federation of Art accepted an offer to turn DeBary Hall into their art and cultural center, as the State Headquarters of the Florida Federation of Art, Incorporated. For one dollar the Hall and a 5-acre (20,000 m^{2}) portion including the swimming pool and tennis courts were transferred.

The State of Florida purchased DeBary Hall in 1967 and began leasing the Hall to the Florida Federation of Art. The Florida Board of Parks and Historic Memorials acquired the Hall and erected a bronze plaque on the front lawn. Within time, the Florida Federation moved their headquarters and DeBary Hall was once again abandoned.

In the 1990s, after years of abandonment, the efforts of many people resulted in a massive restoration project. The State of Florida now leases the historic site to the County of Volusia as a historic house museum.

== Awards and Designations ==
In 1971, DeBary Hall Historic Site was added to the National Register of Historic Places. The site continues to win preservation, educational, and interpretive awards at the local, state, and national level. These awards include two from the Florida Trust for Historic Preservation, the “Outstanding Achievement Award: Interpretive Media” and the “Award for Outstanding Achievement in the Field of Adaptive Reuse”. DeBary Hall Historic Site’s interactive computer exhibit received several awards in 2001 by the American Association for State and Local History, the Florida Historical Society, the Historical Confederation’s Outstanding Educational Program Award, and finally the Dunn Electronic Media Award. In 2008, DeBary Hall Historic Site received the National Association of Counties Achievement Award.

== DeBary Hall Historic Site ==
Today, the DeBary Hall Historic Site encompasses only 10 acres (40,000 m^{2}) of the original 10,000 acres (40 km^{2}) owned by Frederick DeBary. The former estate now makes up a town named in his honor, DeBary, and a portion of Volusia County. The 10 acres (40,000 m^{2}) is owned by the State of Florida and managed by the County of Volusia. The site contains several original structures including the Hall, an icehouse, two servant quarters, and the stables. In 2007, the stable restoration was completed and acknowledged with a Florida Trust for Historic Preservation, Outstanding Achievement in Adaptive Reuse award. Modern structures added to the site include a Visitor’s Center with a gift shop, trail-head pavilions, and an Imagidome Theater. The design and construction of the pavilion and theater follow former outbuildings on the site based on historic photographs.

The historic home is open Tuesday-Sunday for docent-guided tours. The surrounding property is open daily from sunrise to sunset for self-guided grounds walks. DeBary Hall is a part of Volusia County's rails to trails program. The bike trails run over 10 miles (16 km) to Gemini Springs and Lake Monroe Park.
