= Lake Monroe (Florida) =

Lake in the state of Florida, United States

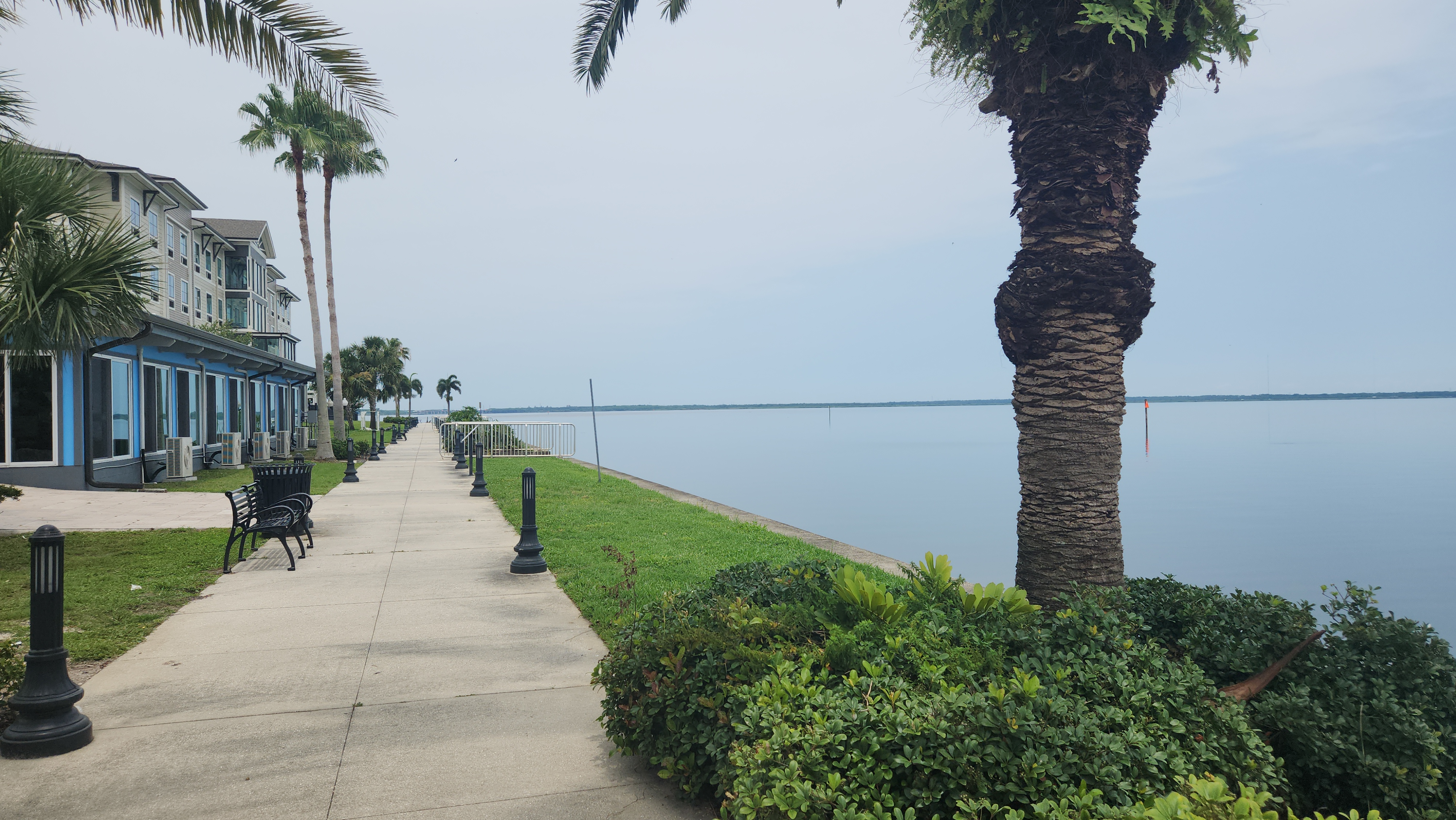
- Southern shore of Lake Monroe

- Location within Florida Location within the United States
- Location: Volusia / Seminole counties, Florida, United States
- Coordinates: 28°49′10″N 81°15′40″W
- Type: Lake
- Primary outflows: St. Johns River
- Basin countries: United States
- Surface area: 8,771 acres (3,549 ha)
- Settlements: Sanford, DeBary, Deltona
- Website: www.friendsoflakemonroe.org

Lake Monroe is one of the lakes that make up the St. Johns River system. The lake has an area of 8,771 acres (3,549 ha). The city of Sanford is situated along the southern shore, while Deltona and the unincorporated community of Enterprise are located along the northern shore. The Lake Monroe Wildlife Management Area lies on the southeast shore.

== Environment ==
The Lake Monroe Wildlife Management Area lies on the southeast shore of the lake. Sanford holds a contract with an environmental company for midge prevention purposes.

== See also ==
- Green Springs Park
- List of lakes of the St. Johns River
- St. Johns River
