= De Leon Springs State Park =

Florida State Park in Volusia County

- IUCN category V (protected landscape/seascape)
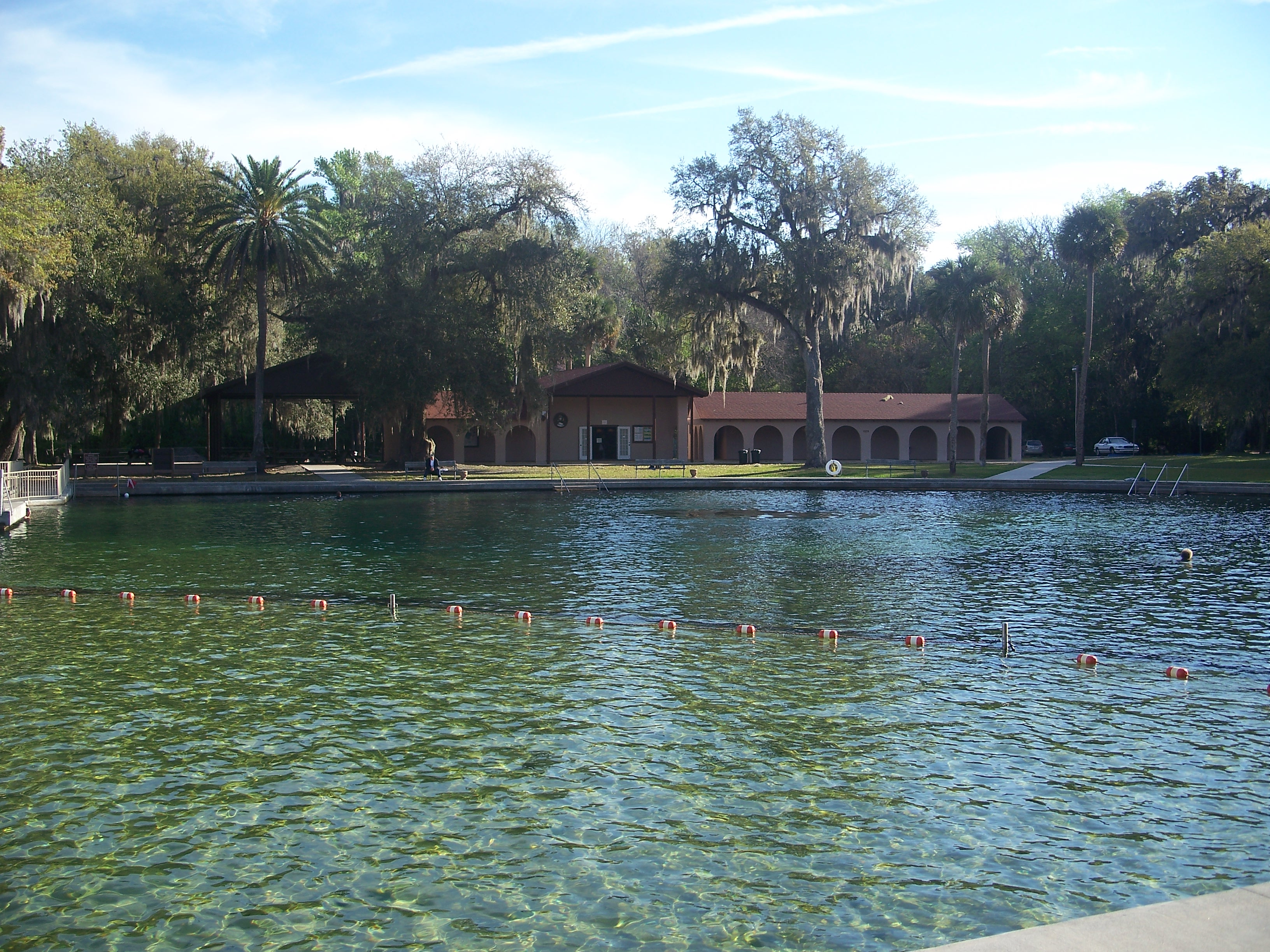

- Location within Florida Location within the United States
- Interactive map of De Leon Springs State Park
- Location: Volusia County, Florida, USA
- Nearest city: DeLeon Springs, Florida
- Coordinates: 29°08′24″N 81°22′08″W
- Established: 1970
- Governing body: Florida Department of Environmental Protection

De Leon Springs State Park is a Florida State Park in Volusia County, Florida. It is located in DeLeon Springs, off CR 3.

== Geology ==
The park covers 253 hectares (625 acres) in Volusia County, built around a natural spring, flowing at a rate of about 20 million gallons a day (Second Magnitude Spring), that remains 22 degrees Celsius or 72 degrees Fahrenheit year-round and reaches a depth of 9.1 meters (30 feet) at the spring boil.

== Fauna ==
Park wildlife includes manatees, alligators, white-tailed deer, turtles and otters. Among the birds that can be seen are anhingas, egrets, hawks, limpkins, ospreys, vultures, American bald eagles, American white ibis, belted kingfishers, American coots and great blue herons.

Seasonal sightings may include Florida black bears (the park is connected to Lake George State Forest and Lake Woodruff National Wildlife Refuge), manatees seeking relief from the cold during winter and migratory birds such as a variety of duck species.

== History ==
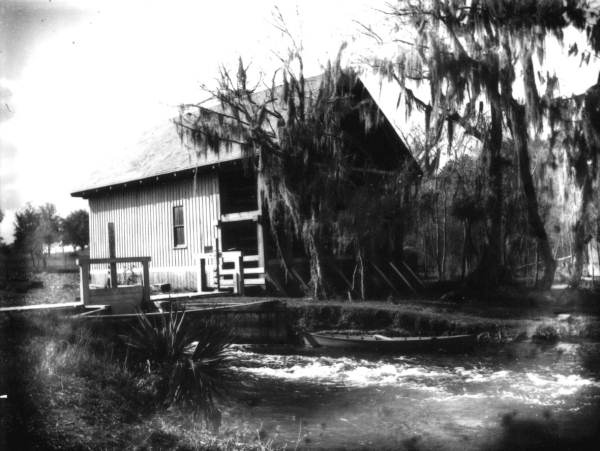
Mill house at De Leon Springs, c. 1910

People have been living near the spring at least 6,000 years. Two dugout canoes, 5,000 and 6,000 years old, were found in the spring in 1985 and 1990. They are the oldest canoes discovered in the Western Hemisphere.

There are no known records linking Ponce de Leon to the spring. The name of the area was changed from Spring Garden to Ponce de Leon Springs to attract tourists after the Jacksonville, Tampa, Key West Railway was constructed in 1886. Spanish missions, however, were established in the late 1500s. The native people encountered here were referred to as the Mayaca, differing from the Timucuans in that they were fisher-hunter-gatherers, while the Timucuans were sedentary agriculturalists. The Spanish would return in 1783 after regaining the land from Great Britain (who had held it since 1763), granting land, including the spring, to William Williams in 1804. He established the first plantation, calling it "Spring Garden", where corn, cotton, and sugar cane were grown, using enslaved Africans to perform the work.

Florida became a U.S. territory in 1821. The Woodruffs owned the plantation from 1823 to 1830, selling it to Colonel Orlando Rees, who built the only water-powered sugar mill in Florida. John James Audubon visited Spring Garden in January, 1836, where he first painted the limpkin. The plantation was destroyed by the Seminole Indians in December, 1835, at the beginning of the Second Seminole War and again in 1864 by the Union troops during the American Civil War. After the mill stopped operating in 1864, the building deteriorated until only the wheel remained in the late 1800s. For some unknown reason, the mill building was reconstructed in the early 1900s. The building again fell into disrepair until it was renovated by the Schwarze family in 1961. That year they opened the Old Spanish Sugar Mill Restaurant, which has operated continuously since then.

The area attracted tourists in the 1880s after the railroad arrived, when it was advertised as a winter resort for the springs' alleged healing powers; it was called the Fountain of Youth. A hotel was built near the spring, and a small steamboat brought visitors by water. In 1925, the fourteen-room Ponce de Leon Hotel was constructed; this was the first resort with all the amenities, attracting more upscale northern clientele. In 1953, after a one million dollar project, the Ponce de Leon Springs attraction opened. It featured Exotic Birds, Alligator Pens, Audubon Trail, Jungle Cruise, Hotel and Peacock Dining Room, Old Methuselah cypress tree, SCUBA School and Museum, and two waterskiing elephants—Sunshine Sally and Queenie! The attraction closed in the mid-1960s, the termite-infested hotel torn down, and the property was operated as a private recreational park. In 1980, a local Save Our Spring group was formed, convincing the State of Florida and Volusia County to purchase the spring and 55 acres for one million dollars. In June, 1982, De Leon Springs State Park opened, with Gov. Bob Graham attending the dedication in August.

== Recreational Activities ==
Canoeing, kayaking, and fishing are permitted in the spring run; swimming is permitted only in the spring pool. The four-mile Wild Persimmon Hiking Trail meanders through hardwood hammock, cypress swamp and old agricultural fields. Hikers may see white-tailed deer, turkeys, wild hogs and the Florida black bear. The one-half mile paved nature trail is wheelchair accessible; it has interpretive signs and a boardwalk to a 600-year-old bald cypress tree. Amenities include a swimming area, picnic pavilions, picnic areas with tables and grills, volleyball court, a playground, fishing pier, a boat ramp and boat dock. Guided eco-history tours are offered by boat from the park to the adjacent Lake Woodruff National Wildlife Refuge. A visitor center providing historical and natural history information is open daily. The Old Spanish Sugar Mill restaurant specializes in pancakes, which guests prepare on individual griddles at their tables.

Recreational SCUBA diving is not permitted, only instructional diving by a certified dive instructor. Cave diving, including free diving, is not allowed.

== Hours ==
Florida state parks are open between 8 a.m. and sundown every day of the year (including holidays).

== Gallery ==
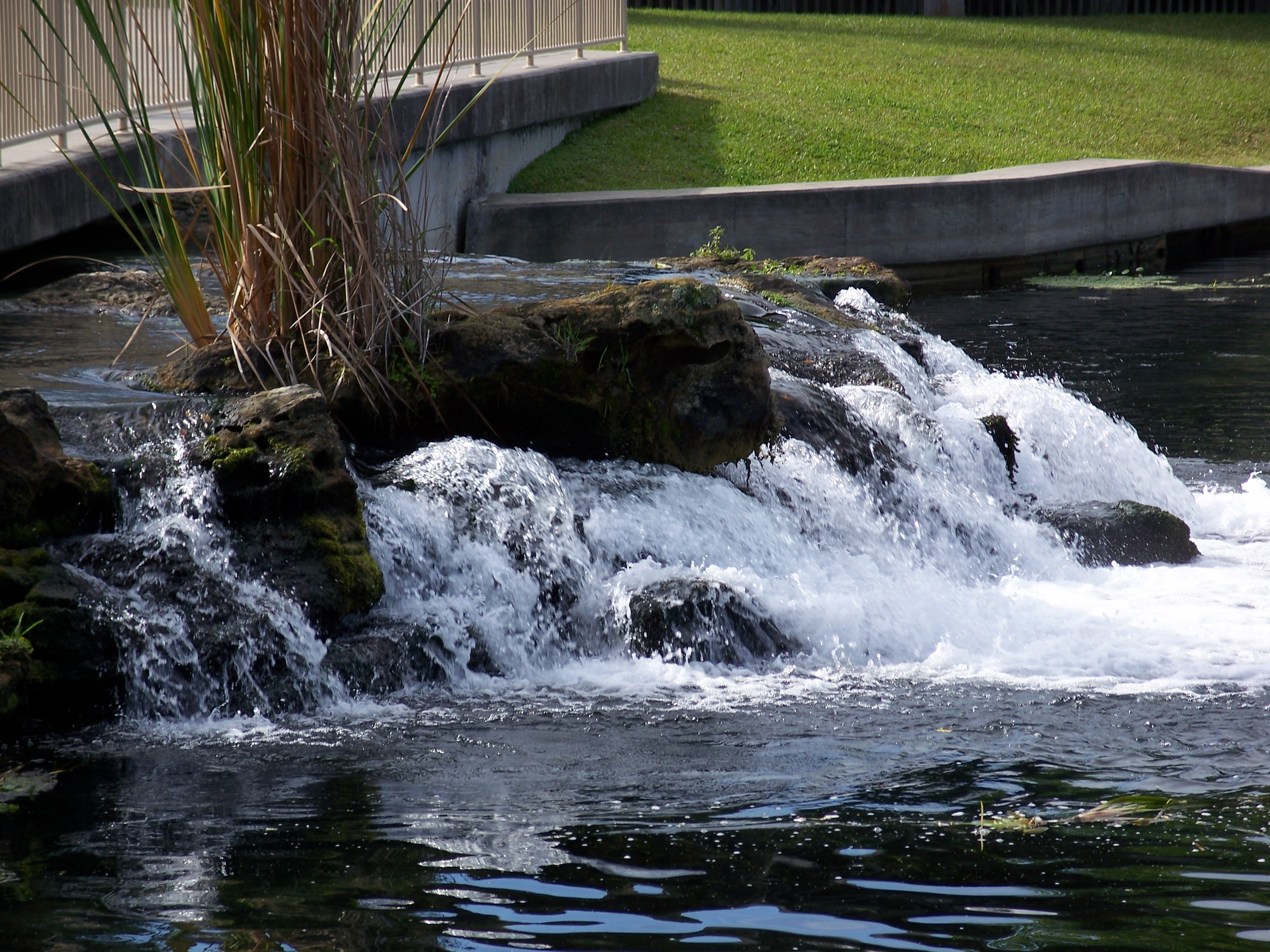

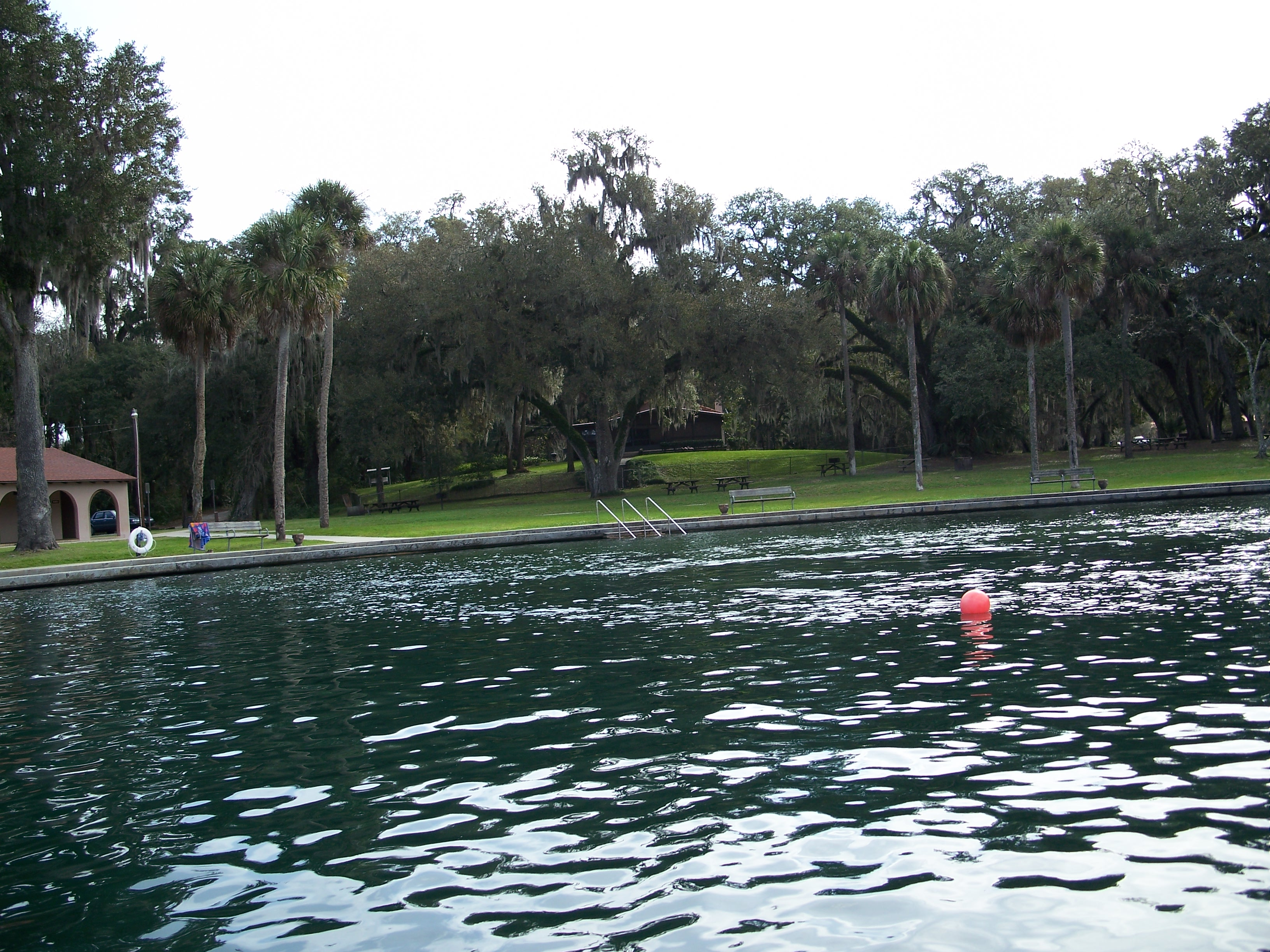

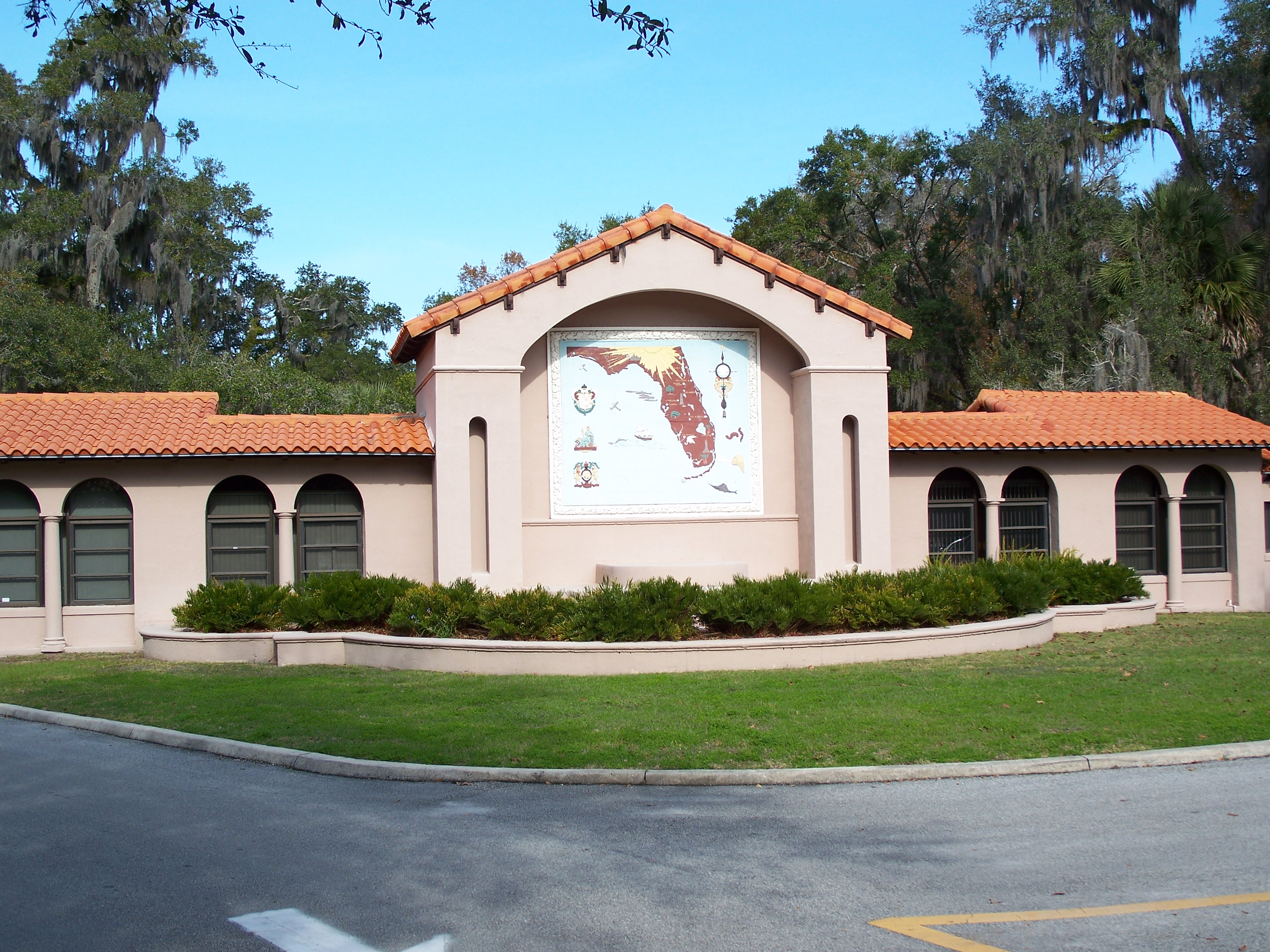

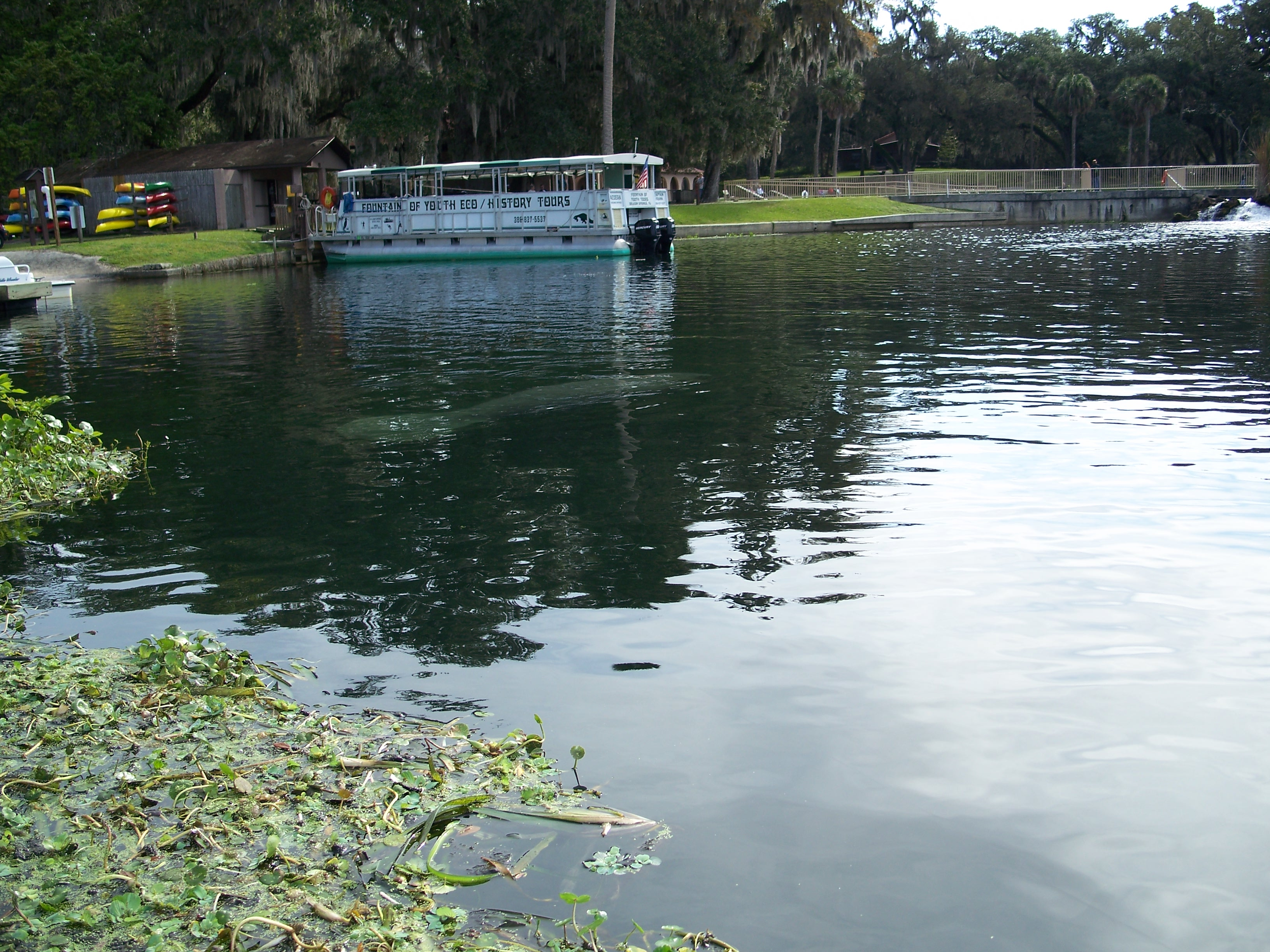
