= Volusia County, Florida =

County in Florida, United States

- County
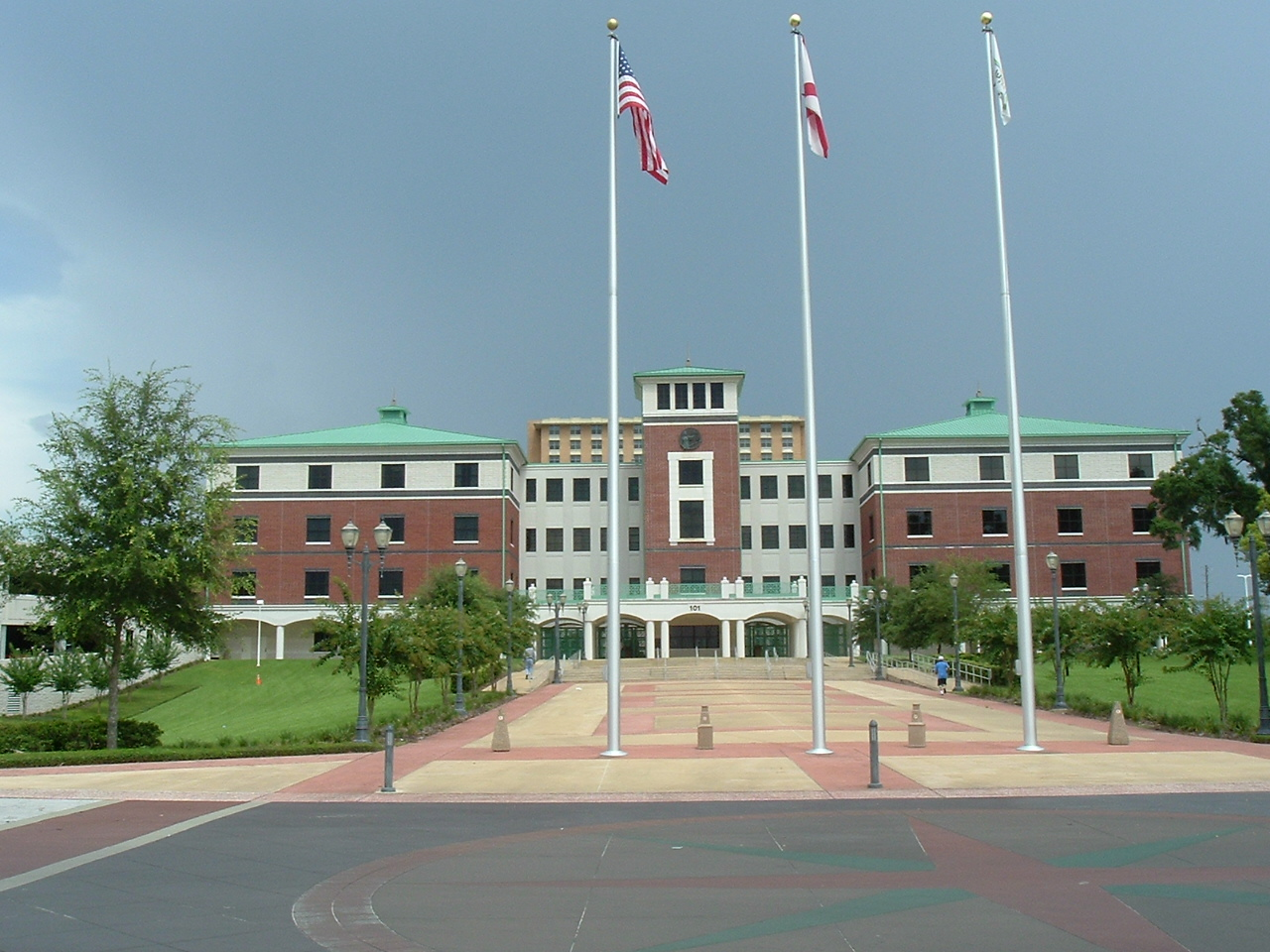
- Volusia County Courthouse in DeLand, built in 2001

- Flag Logo

- Location within the U.S. state of Florida
- Coordinates: 29°3′N 81°9′W
- Country: United States
- State: Florida
- Founded: December 29, 1854
- Named for: Community of Volusia
- Seat: DeLand
- Largest city: Deltona

Government
  - County chair: Jeff Brower (R) (Note: The Volusia County chair is officially elected in a non-partisan election, despite common de facto party affiliation.)

Area
  - Total: 1,432.44 sq mi (3,710.0 km^{2})
  - Land: 1,101.03 sq mi (2,851.7 km^{2})
  - Water: 331.40 sq mi (858.3 km^{2}) 23.14%

Population (2020)
  - Total: 553,543
  - Estimate (2025): ▲606,573
  - Density: 547/sq mi (211/km^{2})
- Time zone: UTC−5 (Eastern)
  - Summer (DST): UTC−4 (EDT)
- Congressional districts: 6th, 7th
- Website: volusia.org

Volusia County (Note: /vəˈluːʃə/ və-LOO-shə; alternatively /vəˈluːsiə/ və-LOO-see-ə) is a county located in the east-central part of the U.S. state of Florida between the St. Johns River and the Atlantic Ocean. As of the 2020 census, the county was home to 553,543 people, an increase of 11.9% from the 2010 census. It was founded on December 29, 1854, from a portion of Orange County, and was named for the community of Volusia, located in northwestern Volusia County. The original county seat was Enterprise. Since 1887, the county seat has been DeLand. Volusia County is part of the Deltona–Daytona Beach–Ormond Beach metropolitan statistical area, as well as part of the larger Orlando–Deltona–Daytona Beach Combined statistical area.

== Etymology ==
The origins of the word "Volusia" are unclear, though several theories exist:

1. The name came from a word meaning "Land of the Euchee", from the Euchee Indians who migrated into the area after the Timucua Indian cultures declined in the early 1700s. The Euchees (or Uchees) lived in the area of Spring Gardens, about 10 miles (16 km) south of Volusia.
2. It was named after a British settler named Voluz, who owned a plantation located on the St. Johns River in the late 1700s.
3. The name originated from the Veluche, the surname of a French or Belgian owner of the trading post in Volusia. According to some, this was during the British regime, and according to others, it was around 1818. Over time, the name Veluche became anglicized to Volusia.
4. The town was established by and named for Jere Volusia.
5. The settlement was named by the Spanish after the celebrated Roman jurist Lucius Volusius Maecianus, who wrote 30 books and tutored Marcus Aurelius, the Roman emperor and philosopher.

== History ==
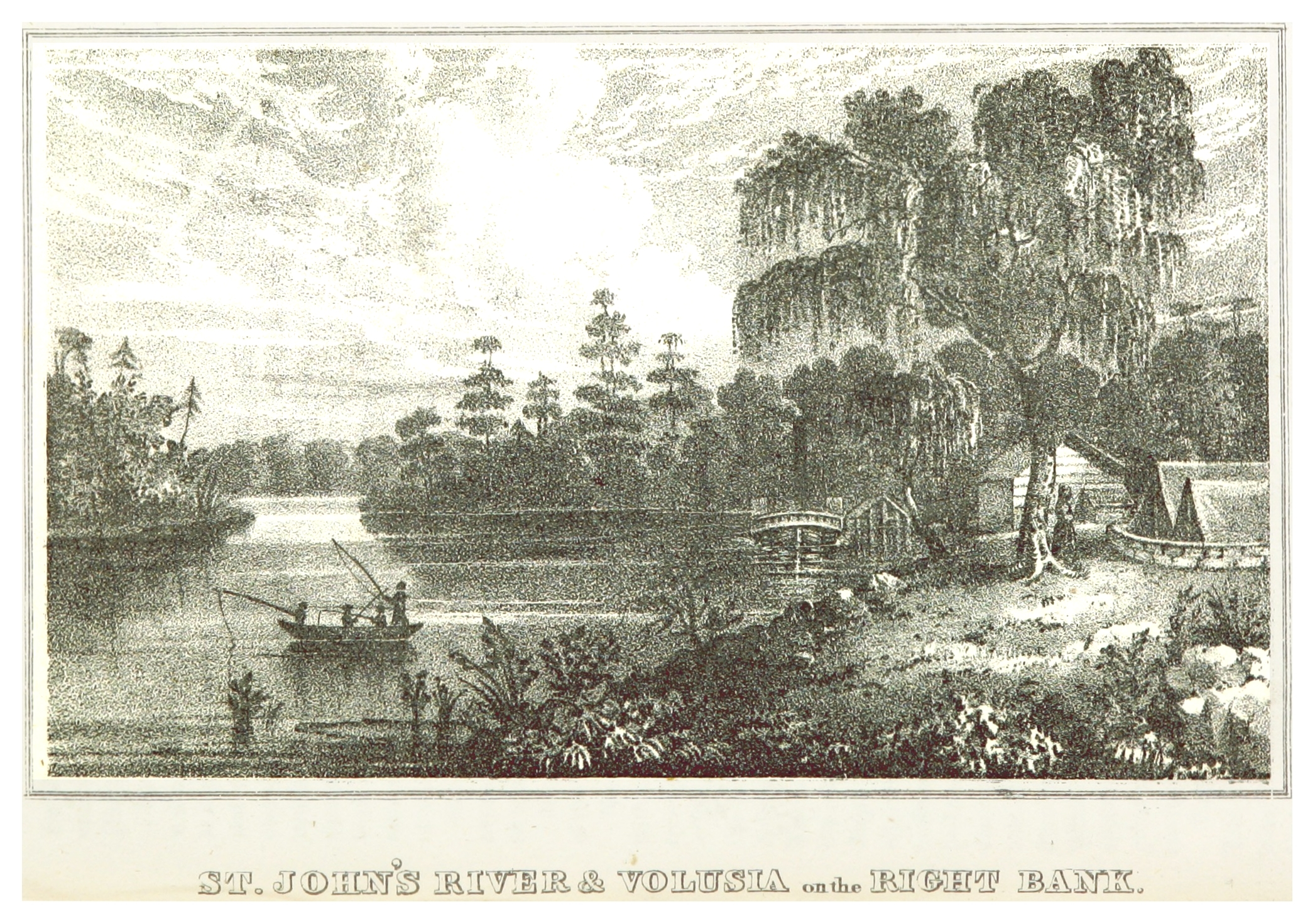
Volusia on the right bank of the St. Johns River (c. 1835)

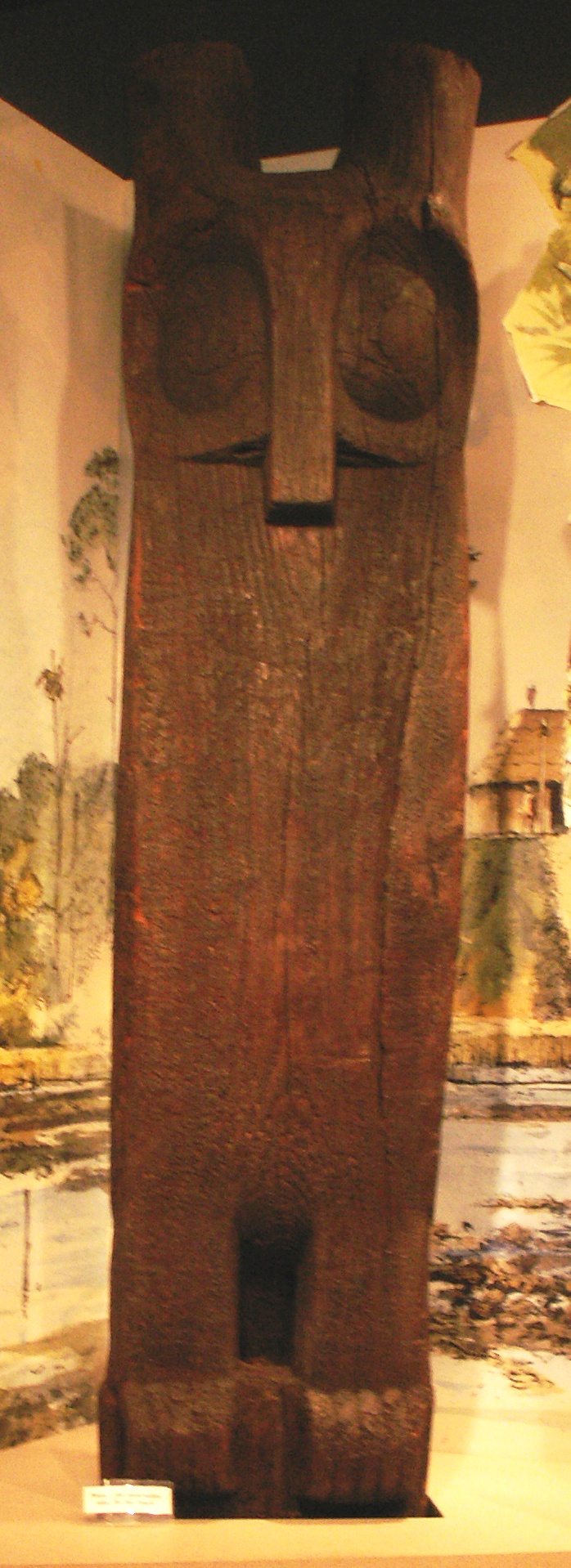
Timucua owl totem found near Hontoon Island in the St. Johns River, Volusia County

Volusia County was named after its largest community, Volusia, when the Florida Legislature created it by dividing Orange County on December 29, 1854. At the time, Volusia County had about 600 residents.

The land area of present-day Volusia County was long inhabited by the indigenous Timucua and Mayaca peoples. Neither historic group exists today as distinct ethnic tribes, having been decimated by disease and war in the decades after contact with European traders and settlers. The large shell middens at Tomoka State Park and other evidence of their historic habitation can still be seen in various areas of Volusia County.

During the British occupation of Florida, a colony known as New Smyrna was started in southeast Volusia County by Andrew Turnbull. This colony was connected to St. Augustine, the capital of East Florida, via the Kings Road. After the failure of the colony the settlers, many of whom were ethnic Menorcan and Greek, traveled the 70 mi (110 km) to move to St. Augustine.

The Seminole Indians, descendants of the Creek tribe of Alabama and Georgia who resisted forced relocation to Indian Territory, also camped in various parts of Volusia County. During the Second Seminole War (1836–1842), the Seminole burned a large sugar plantation in what is today the city of Daytona Beach.

On the east shore of the St. Johns River in Volusia, in present-day DeBary, General Winfield Scott established a fort/depot in 1836 named Fort Florida.

== Geography ==
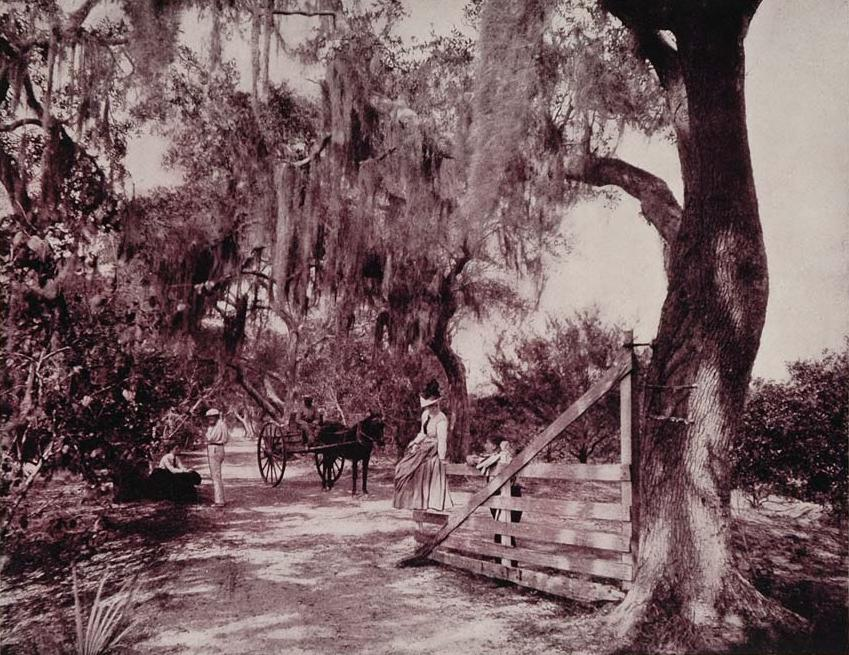
Avenue of Moss-Covered Oaks, Near Ormond, Florida -- an 1893 duotone print

According to the U.S. Census Bureau, the county has a total area of 1,432 square miles (3,710 km^{2}), of which 1,101 square miles (2,850 km^{2}) are land and 331 square miles (860 km^{2}) (23.1%) are covered by water.

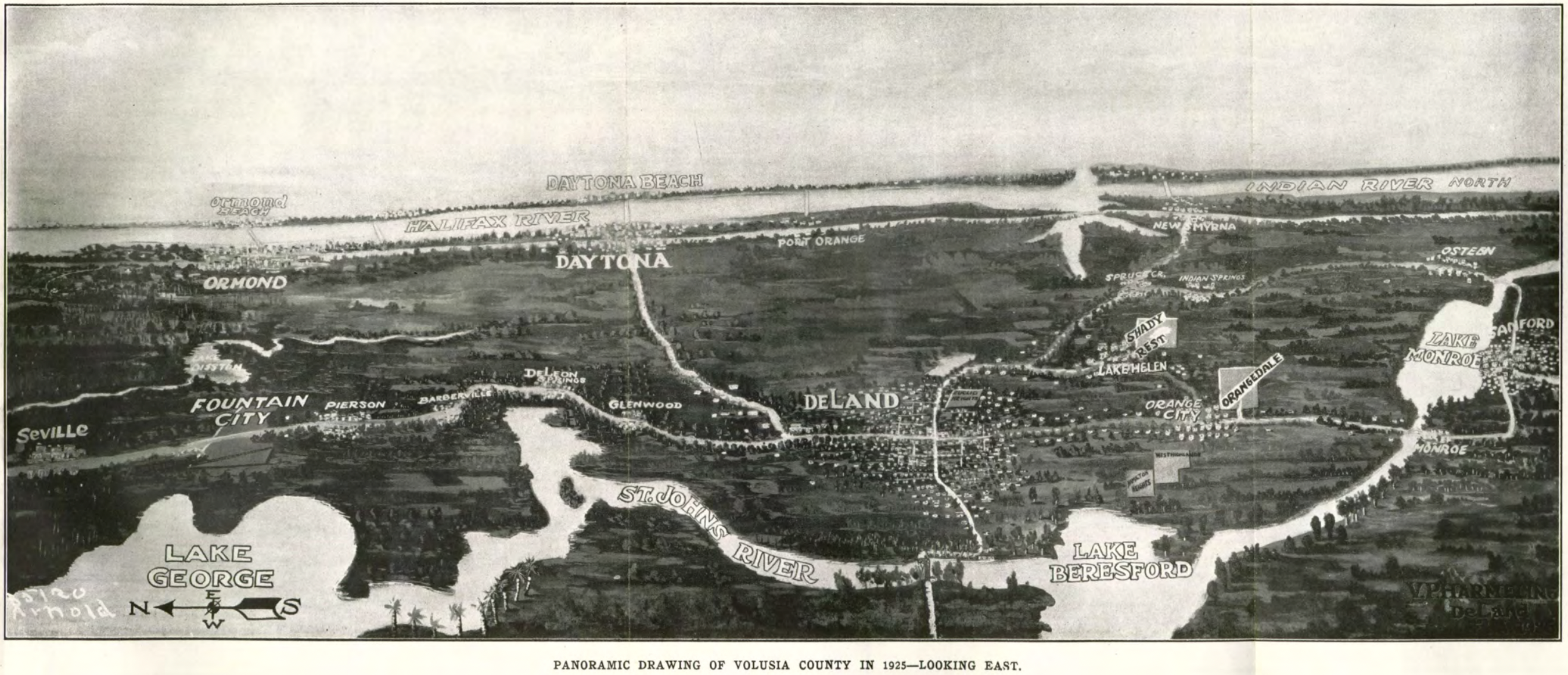
Drawing of Volusia County in 1925 (looking east from the St. Johns River)

Volusia County is bordered on the west by the St. Johns River and Lake Monroe, and by the Atlantic Ocean to the east. Roughly the size of Rhode Island, Volusia is situated 50 mi (80 km) northeast of Orlando, 60 mi (97 km) north of the Kennedy Space Center, and 89 mi (143 km) south of Jacksonville.

=== Regions ===
The Volusia County government divides the county into three regions. This parallels the three calling regions used by BellSouth, the regional phone company:

- East Volusia, also known as the greater Daytona Beach area, or the Halifax area (named for the Halifax River that runs through the area), includes the cities of Daytona Beach, Daytona Beach Shores, Holly Hill, Ormond Beach, Ponce Inlet, Port Orange, and South Daytona; and the surrounding unincorporated areas close to these cities.
- Southeast Volusia, also known as the greater New Smyrna Beach area, includes the cities of New Smyrna Beach, Edgewater, and Oak Hill; also the unincorporated areas close to these cities.
- West Volusia, also called St. Johns River country (named for the St. Johns River, which flows nearby), includes the cities of Barberville, DeBary, DeLand, DeLeon Springs, Deltona, Glenwood, Enterprise, Lake Helen, Orange City, Pierson, and Seville, and the surrounding unincorporated areas close to these cities. Deltona is the largest city in Volusia County.

=== Adjacent counties ===
- Flagler County – north
- Brevard County – south
- Seminole County – southwest
- Lake County – west
- Marion and Putnam Counties – northwest

=== Parks and gardens ===
- Addison Blockhouse Historic State Park
- Blue Spring State Park
- Bulow Creek State Park
- Canaveral National Seashore
- De Leon Springs State Park
- Dunlawton Plantation and Sugar Mill
- Gemini Springs Park
- Green Springs Park
- Hontoon Island State Park
- Lake Ashby Park
- Lake George State Forest
- Lake Woodruff National Wildlife Refuge
- North Peninsula State Park
- Ormond Beach Memorial Art Museum and Gardens
- Seminole Rest
- Smyrna Dunes Park
- Sugar Mill Ruins
- Tiger Bay State Forest
- Tomoka State Park

=== Rivers and waterways ===
- Atlantic Ocean
- Halifax River
- Intracoastal Waterway
- Lake George
- Lake Monroe
- Mosquito Lagoon
- Ponce de León Inlet
- Spruce Creek
- St. Johns River
- Tomoka River

=== Major attractions ===
- Athens Theater in DeLand
- Atlantic Center for the Arts in New Smyrna Beach
- Bongoland Ruins in Port Orange
- Daytona International Speedway in Daytona Beach
- Decommissioned DC-7 at Epic Flight Academy in New Smyrna Beach
- Jackie Robinson Ballpark in Daytona Beach
- Marine Science Center in Ponce Inlet
- Museum of Arts and Sciences (Daytona Beach)
- New Smyrna Speedway in New Smyrna Beach
- Ocean Center (convention center) in Daytona Beach
- Old Sugar Mill Grill & Griddle House in DeLeon Springs
- Ormond Memorial Art Museum & Garden in Ormond Beach
- Ponce de Leon Inlet Lighthouse and Museum in Ponce Inlet
- Skydive DeLand at DeLand Airport
- Volusia County Fair and Expo Center in DeLand
- Volusia Speedway Park in Barberville

== Demographics ==
Historical population
Census	Pop.	Note	%±
1860	1,158		—
1870	1,723		48.8%
1880	3,294		91.2%
1890	8,467		157.0%
1900	10,003		18.1%
1910	16,510		65.1%
1920	23,374		41.6%
1930	42,757		82.9%
1940	53,710		25.6%
1950	74,229		38.2%
1960	125,319		68.8%
1970	169,487		35.2%
1980	258,762		52.7%
1990	370,712		43.3%
2000	443,343		19.6%
2010	494,593		11.6%
2020	553,543		11.9%
2025 (est.)	606,573		9.6%
U.S. Decennial Census; 1790–1960 1900–1990; 1990–2000 2024

=== Racial and ethnic composition ===
Volusia County, Florida – Racial and ethnic composition Note: the US Census treats Hispanic/Latino as an ethnic category. This table excludes Latinos from the racial categories and assigns them to a separate category. Hispanics/Latinos may be of any race.
Race / Ethnicity (NH = Non-Hispanic)	Pop 1980	Pop 1990	Pop 2000	Pop 2010	Pop 2020	% 1980	% 1990	% 2000	% 2010	% 2020
White alone (NH)	224,182	319,259	363,045	372,982	379,527	86.64%	86.12%	81.89%	75.41%	68.56%
Black or African American alone (NH)	28,607	32,985	40,380	49,548	55,338	11.06%	8.90%	9.11%	10.02%	10.00%
Native American or Alaska Native alone (NH)	427	856	1,232	1,356	1,262	0.17%	0.23%	0.28%	0.27%	0.23%
Asian alone (NH)	1,046	2,637	4,360	7,368	10,478	0.40%	0.71%	0.98%	1.49%	1.89%
Native Hawaiian or Pacific Islander alone (NH)	x	x	138	166	266	x	x	0.03%	0.03%	0.05%
Other race alone (NH)	376	135	441	778	2,692	0.15%	0.04%	0.10%	0.16%	0.49%
Mixed race or Multiracial (NH)	x	x	4,636	7,178	21,328	x	x	1.05%	1.45%	3.85%
Hispanic or Latino (any race)	4,124	14,840	29,111	55,217	82,652	1.59%	4.00%	6.57%	11.16%	14.93%
Total	258,762	370,712	443,343	494,593	553,543	100.00%	100.00%	100.00%	100.00%	100.00%

=== 2020 census ===
As of the 2020 census, the county had 553,543 residents and a median age of 48.2 years. 17.2% of residents were under the age of 18 and 25.7% of residents were 65 years of age or older. For every 100 females there were 94.9 males, and for every 100 females age 18 and over there were 93.1 males age 18 and over. The 2020 census counted 232,301 households and 136,510 families in the county, of which 22.7% had children under the age of 18 living in them, 44.3% were married-couple households, 19.0% were households with a male householder and no spouse or partner present, and 28.8% were households with a female householder and no spouse or partner present. About 29.8% of all households were made up of individuals and 15.5% had someone living alone who was 65 years of age or older. There were 272,325 housing units in the county, of which 14.7% were vacant. Among occupied housing units, 71.8% were owner-occupied and 28.2% were renter-occupied. The homeowner vacancy rate was 2.5% and the rental vacancy rate was 9.9%. The racial makeup of the county was 72.3% White, 10.4% Black or African American, 0.4% American Indian and Alaska Native, 1.9% Asian, 0.1% Native Hawaiian and Pacific Islander, 5.0% from some other race, and 9.9% from two or more races. Hispanic or Latino residents of any race comprised 14.9% of the population. Of the population, 91.5% lived in urban areas, while 8.5% lived in rural areas.

=== 2016 ===
As of 2016, an estimated 205,310 households were in Volusia County. The total population was 510,806. About 86.8% spoke English as their only language, so 13.2% could speak a language other than English. The largest ancestry groups in the county were English-American at 15.7%, German-American at 12.3%, Irish-American at 11.0% and Italian-American at 7.0%.

=== 2000 census ===
As of the 2000 census, 443,343 people, 184,723 households, and 120,069 families were residing in the county. The population density was 402 inhabitants per square mile (155/km^{2}). The 211,938 housing units averaged 192 per square mile (74/km^{2}). The racial makeup of the county was 86.11% White, 9.29% African American, 0.31% Native American, 1.00% Asian, 1.86% from other races, and 1.43% from two or more races. About 6.57% of the population were Hispanic or Latino of any race; ancestry was 13.7% German, 11.5% Irish, 11.2% English, 10.7% American, and 8.7% Italian ancestry.

Of the 184,723 households, 24.10% had children under the age of 18 living with them, 50.40% were married couples living together, 10.90% had a female householder with no husband present, and 35.00% were not families. About 27.90% of all households were made up of individuals, and 13.60% had someone living alone who was 65 years of age or older. The average household size was 2.32, and the average family size was 2.82.

In the county, the age distribution was 20.30% under 18, 8.20% from 18 to 24, 25.30% from 25 to 44, 24.20% from 45 to 64, and 22.10% at 65 or older. The median age was 42 years. For every 100 females, there were 94.50 males. For every 100 females age 18 and over, there were 91.80 males.

The median income for a household in the county was $35,219, and for a family was $41,767. Males had a median income of $30,573 versus $22,471 for females. The per capita income for the county was $19,664. About 7.90% of families and 11.60% of the population were below the poverty line, including 16.30% of those under age 18 and 7.10% of those age 65 or over.

== Politics ==
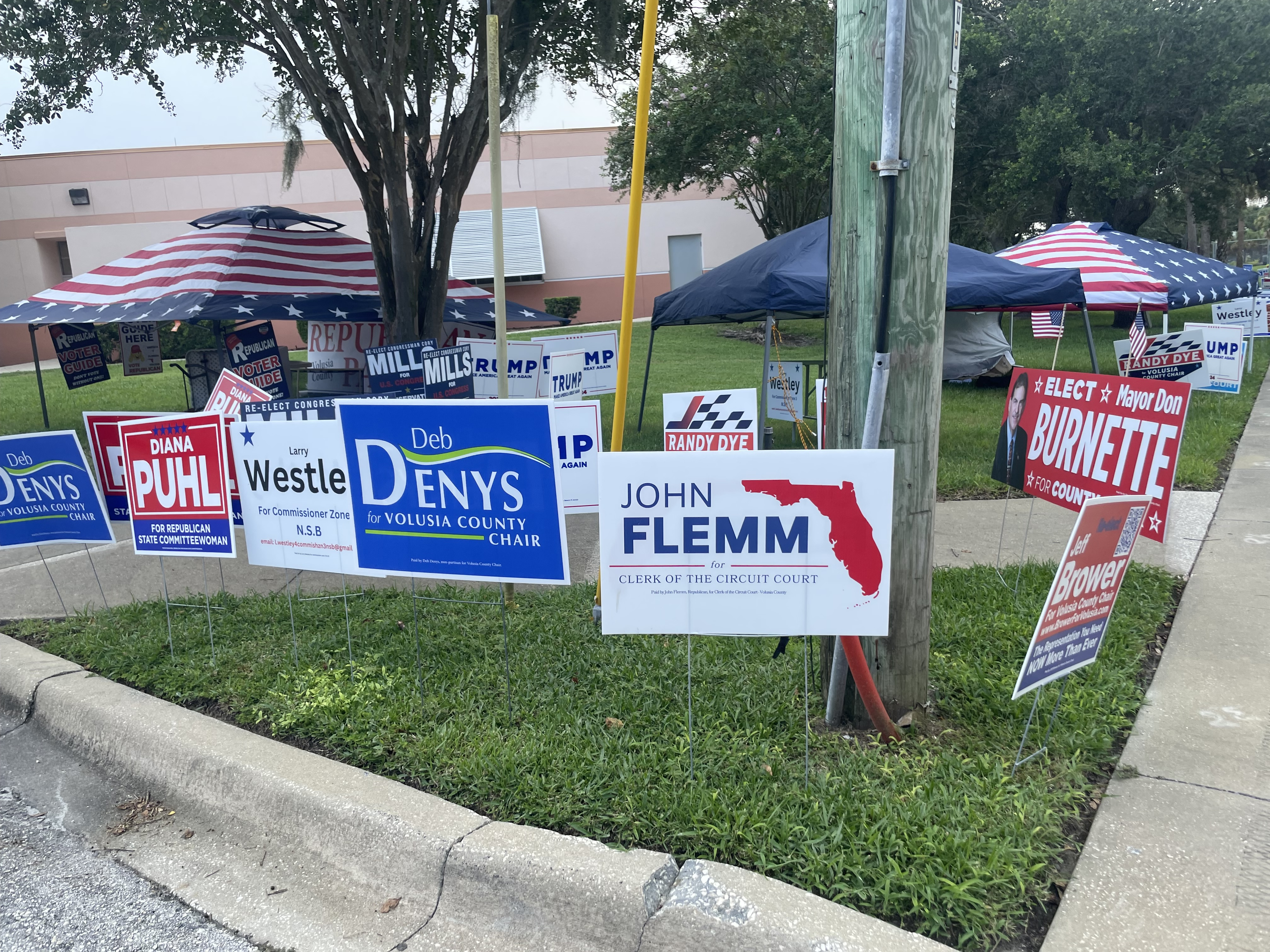
Campaign signs in Volusia County, 2024

=== Voter registration ===
According to the secretary of state's office, Republicans are a plurality of registered voters in Volusia County.

Volusia County Voter Registration & Party Enrollment as of Sep. 30, 2026
Political Party	Total Voters	Percentage
Republican	174,567	43.52%
Democratic	106,878	26.65%
No party affiliation	101,850	25.39%
Minor parties	17,786	4.43%
Total	401,081	100.00%

Until 1952, Volusia County was reliably Democratic, with Republicans only winning it once in 1928. From 1952 to 1988, however, Democrats only carried the county twice, in 1964 and 1976. Democrats then won the county five times in a row from 1988 to 2008. From 2010 to 2024, it trended more Republican, and in 2024 Donald Trump carried the county with over 60% of the vote, the highest percentage won by any candidate since Ronald Reagan’s 1984 landslide. In the 2026 gubernatorial elections, governor-elect Byron Donalds won the county with 55% of the vote, this was the first time the Republican party lost votes since 2006.

Previous Florida Gubernatorial election results in Volusia County
Year	Republican		Democratic	
Year	No.	%	No.	%
2026	131,183	55.6%	101,722	43.1%
2022	155,768	64.0%	79,965	35.3%
2018	124,819	54.6%	100,478	43.9%
2014	86,749	48.8%	79,315	45.1%
2010	77,039	48.9%	73,765	46.9%
2006	76,618	50.1%	72,216	47.2%
2002	85,594	53.8%	72,208	45.4%

United States presidential election results for Volusia County, Florida
Year	Republican		Democratic		Third party(ies)	
Year	No.	%	No.	%	No.	%
1892	0	0.00%	785	85.14%	137	14.86%
1896	635	43.32%	753	51.36%	78	5.32%
1900	255	22.71%	755	67.23%	113	10.06%
1904	263	25.05%	654	62.29%	133	12.67%
1908	444	35.10%	736	58.18%	85	6.72%
1912	162	11.60%	942	67.48%	292	20.92%
1916	886	33.41%	1,541	58.11%	225	8.48%
1920	2,175	41.30%	2,763	52.47%	328	6.23%
1924	1,631	40.83%	2,042	51.11%	322	8.06%
1928	6,648	67.78%	3,043	31.03%	117	1.19%
1932	4,425	37.47%	7,386	62.53%	0	0.00%
1936	4,934	38.37%	7,924	61.63%	0	0.00%
1940	6,509	39.37%	10,024	60.63%	0	0.00%
1944	6,161	42.80%	8,233	57.20%	0	0.00%
1948	7,764	39.46%	9,202	46.76%	2,712	13.78%
1952	19,815	62.46%	11,910	37.54%	0	0.00%
1956	25,103	63.40%	14,489	36.60%	0	0.00%
1960	28,367	54.82%	23,377	45.18%	0	0.00%
1964	24,988	41.72%	34,901	58.28%	0	0.00%
1968	28,024	39.91%	24,987	35.58%	17,209	24.51%
1972	52,656	70.60%	21,637	29.01%	290	0.39%
1976	37,523	42.53%	49,161	55.72%	1,541	1.75%
1980	52,663	51.69%	44,513	43.69%	4,706	4.62%
1984	68,358	60.93%	43,820	39.06%	13	0.01%
1988	74,195	56.56%	55,469	42.28%	1,518	1.16%
1992	59,172	38.05%	65,223	41.94%	31,104	20.00%
1996	63,091	39.39%	78,919	49.28%	18,148	11.33%
2000	82,368	44.84%	97,313	52.98%	3,993	2.17%
2004	111,924	48.89%	115,519	50.46%	1,496	0.65%
2008	113,938	46.53%	127,795	52.19%	3,122	1.28%
2012	117,490	49.94%	114,748	48.78%	3,016	1.28%
2016	143,007	54.32%	109,091	41.44%	11,180	4.25%
2020	173,821	56.42%	130,575	42.38%	3,713	1.21%
2024	187,691	60.45%	120,132	38.69%	2,675	0.86%

== Law and government ==
Under Volusia County's council-manager form of government, voters elect a county council, which consists of seven members who serve four-year terms. Five are elected by district; the county chairman and at-large representative are elected county-wide.

The county council establishes ordinances and policies for the county. It also reviews and approves the county budget annually. The county council appoints a county manager, who carries out the will of the council and handles day-to-day business.

=== Elected officials ===
Members of the Volusia County Council:

Volusia County Council
Position	Incumbent
County chair	Jeff Brower
County council-at-large	Nancy Miller
District 1 council member	Wendy Anderson
District 2 council member	Matt Reinhart
District 3 council member	Danny Robins
District 4 council member	Troy Kent (Vice Chair)
District 5 council member	J. David Sosa

Constitutional Officers
Position	Incumbent
Sheriff	Mike Chitwood
Clerk of the Circuit Court	Laura E. Roth
Property Appraiser	Larry Bartlett
Supervisor of Elections	Lisa Lewis
Tax Collector	Will Roberts

Officers of the 7th Judicial Circuit, which includes Volusia County, elected circuit-wide:

- Chief Judge - Leah R. Case
- State Attorney - R.J. Larizza
- Public Defender - Matthew Metz
- Twenty-six other circuit judges (elected circuit-wide) and seventeen county judges (elected county-wide)

=== County offices ===
- Thomas C. Kelly Administration Center, 123 W. Indiana Ave., DeLand 32720
- Daytona Beach Administration Building, 250 N. Beach St., Daytona Beach 32114
- New Smyrna Beach Administration Office, 111 Canal St., New Smyrna Beach 32168
- Orange City Administration Office, 2744 Enterprise Rd., Orange City 32763

=== Justice ===
The county's courts operate from facilities in both DeLand and Daytona Beach. There, they preside over a variety of cases, including felonies, misdemeanors, traffic, and domestic cases in their dockets. An elected prosecutor tries cases for the public. Defendants may find representation through the office of the elected public defender.

The power of electing the county's sheriff lies with the county's residents. The county sheriff is directly responsible to the courts, but also to the state for the enforcement of state laws. The county sheriff's deputies provide law enforcement to the unincorporated areas of Volusia County, and assist the various municipal police departments, such as the Daytona Beach Police Department.

Many volunteers work alongside the paid professionals. Included are Citizen Observer Program (COP), who are volunteers working under the direction of the county sheriff and play a part in the county's policing operations.

The Volusia County Correctional Center and the Volusia County Branch Jail are both located on U.S. Highway 92, also known as International Speedway Boulevard, which is roughly equidistant between DeLand and Daytona Beach. The county's jail imprisons inmates awaiting trial, convicted offenders who have yet to be sentenced, or those who have been sentenced for a term of a year or less. Longer sentences may be served in the Florida state prison system or alternatively in the federal prison system according to the dictates of the offense.

=== Libraries ===
The county centrally controls 14 libraries, with DeLand and Daytona Beach-City Island being the largest two. Each library branch is administered by geographic region.

Region	Libraries
Ormond Beach Region	Ormond Beach Regional Library
Daytona Beach Region	Daytona Beach Regional Library (Daytona Beach-City Island); John H. Dickerson Heritage Library (Daytona Beach-Keech St.); Hope Place Public Library
Port Orange Region	Port Orange Regional Library
New Smyrna Beach Region	New Smyrna Beach Regional Library; Edgewater Public Library; Oak Hill Public Library
DeLand Region	DeLand Regional Library; Pierson Public Library
Deltona Region	Deltona Regional Library; DeBary Public Library; Lake Helen Public Library; Orange City Public Library

Collections included 869,491 books, 83,943 videos, 58,784 audio materials, 2,051 magazines and newspapers, over 100,000 government documents, and 51 licensed databases. Personal computers for public use are hooked up on broadband in all libraries. An estimated 230,000 Volusia County residents have library cards. One library card is valid at all locations, and materials are lent between locations through a daily courier service and outside the libraries by interlibrary loan. Library cards are free for all Volusia County residents.

Depending on size, the branches have different operating hours; six are open every day of the week (Ormond Beach, Daytona Beach-City Island, Port Orange, New Smyrna Beach, DeLand, and Deltona), three are open six days a week (Edgewater, Hope Place, and DeBary), and five are open five days a week (Daytona Beach-Keech Street, Oak Hill, Pierson, Lake Helen, and Orange City).

The Volusia County Library System was officially started in 1961. Prior to 1961, there were small libraries throughout Volusia County that were maintained by different organizations prevalent in the county. In 1949, Charlotte Smith started an effort to organize the public library system within Volusia County. In 1960, 10 libraries existed in Volusia County, however they were not connected together in a centralized library system. In September 1960, state officials met with librarians and county officials to discuss how the Library Services Act could be applied to Volusia County. A committee was formed to study the conditions of the libraries within the county and determine if organizing the libraries in the county into a centralized system was an appropriate move. After a year the committee found that a countywide library system would be the best course of action for the county. With the development of the Volusia County Library System, a library board was appointed by the governor and the board hired Bradley Simon to be the first director of the Volusia County Library System. During this time, bookmobiles were purchased and sent to rural areas in Volusia County to provide residents there with library services. By 1962, nine public libraries and the bookmobiles were part of the Volusia County Library System, and within the next four years Holly Hill, Ormond Beach, and Orange City joined the system. As new funds were made available, new construction of library facilities occurred, with many of the libraries in the Volusia County Library System being granted new buildings. In 1976 the Deltona Library opened and became the only library that the county fully owned. In 1977 the Dickerson Community Center Library opened and served the black community of Daytona Beach, and is now the John H. Dickerson Heritage Library. Expansion in the 1980s included the construction of buildings for the Port Orange Regional Library in 1984, the Lake Helen Public Library and the Edgewater Public Library in 1988, and the DeLand Regional Library in 1989.

== Economy ==
The overall gross metro product (GMP) for Volusia County economy increased from $12.98 billion in 2005 to $13.69 billion in 2006; a $709.9 million increase. The GMP is an annual measurement of the total economic output and sales of goods and services provided within the metropolitan statistical area that comprises all of Volusia County and its 16 cities. A GMP of $13.69 billion represents a significant circulation of new capital resources in an economy populated by just over 500,000 residents.

Local consumer confidence and a continued immigration of an estimated 28,800 new residents, new capital investments for new construction exceeding $1.11 billion, and the steady growth of professional and health-care services continued to drive much of the county's economic viability.

Volusia County's manufacturing sector maintained a steady and stable position within the local economy contrary to the declining trends being experienced elsewhere within Florida. The overall number of manufacturers present within the county increased to over 430 in 2006 and accounted for a large portion of the county's GMP. Manufacturing maintains one of the highest of all average wage levels within the county and generates a higher rate of circulation of economic impact than any other business sector that comprises the local economy.

Volusia County's manufacturing sector generated an average annual wage of $37,632 in 2006, well above the county's average annual wage of $32,200 for all workers.

== Transportation ==
=== Airports ===
- Bob Lee Flight Strip (Closed)
- Daytona Beach International
- DeLand Municipal Airport
- Massey Ranch Airpark
- New Smyrna Beach Municipal Airport
- Ormond Beach Municipal Airport
- Pierson Municipal Airport
- Spruce Creek Airport (Private)

=== Major roads ===
- I-95 (SR 9) is the main north–south interstate highway along the east coast of the state. Eight interchanges exist within the county, three of them in Daytona Beach.
- I-4 is the main east–west interstate highway through Central Florida, but it also serves as the westernmost interstate highway in the county. It contains at least seven interchanges and becomes State Road 400 east of I-95.
- US 1 (SR 5 / Ridgewood Avenue) is the main local road through eastern Volusia County, running north–south. It served as the main north–south highway in the state and the eastern half of the county until I-95 was built.
- US 17 (SR 15) is the main local road through western Volusia County, running north–south. The road is named Charles Richard Beall Boulevard in DeBary, Volusia Avenue in Orange City, and Woodland Boulevard in DeLand.
- US 92 (SR 600), an east–west route, shares a concurrency with US 17 further south in Polk County until branching off onto the International Speedway Boulevard.
- SR A1A is the scenic coastal alternate route to US 1, which also includes some county road spurs and extensions.
- SR 11, a scenic north–south road, runs from US 17 north of DeLand to US 1 in Bunnell in Flagler County.
- SR 40, an east–west road in northern Volusia County enters the county from the Astor Bridge over the St. Johns River and heads east towards Ormond Beach.
- SR 44 (New York Avenue), an east–west road in southern Volusia County, enters the county from the Crows Bluff Bridge over the St. Johns River and heads east towards New Smyrna Beach.
- SR 46, an east–west road on the southwestern corner of Volusia County, enters the county from the Mims Bridge over the St. Johns River and enters Brevard County with no major junctions.
- SR 421 (Taylor Road / Dunlawton Avenue) is a connecting east–west road between I-95 and the Port Orange Causeway.
- SR 483 (Clyde Morris Boulevard), a north–south state road, it runs west of SR 5A from Port Orange to Holly Hill. It runs along the eastern border of both Daytona Beach International Airport and Daytona International Speedway.

=== Public transportation ===
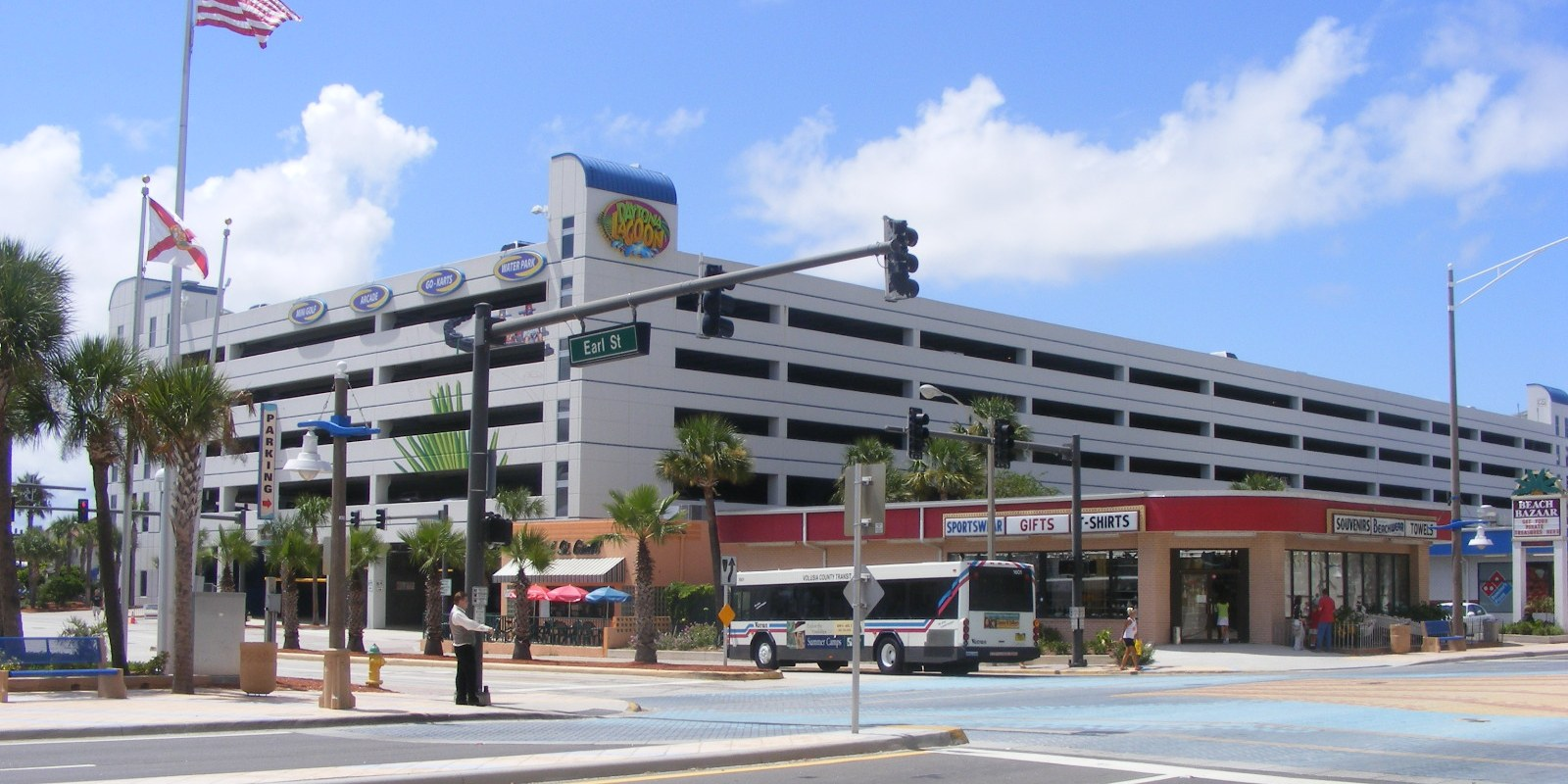
The Volusia County Parking Garage in Daytona Beach

Volusia County Public Transit System (VOTRAN) is the local bus service. The buses offer service throughout the county, Monday through Saturday, from 7 am to 7 pm, and is handicapped-accessible. Limited service is offered in East Volusia in the evenings and on Sundays. The cost is $1.25 per trip, $3.00 for a one-day bus pass, or $40 for a 31-day pass (valid for all VOTRAN routes).

Passenger train service to Volusia County is provided by Amtrak on the Silver Meteor and Silver Star routes. Service between Volusia County and Orlando is provided by SunRail, a commuter rail line running from Volusia to Orange County. The initial phase of the project commenced in 2014 and extends service to as far north as DeBary. A planned expansion was to include the DeLand Amtrak station in 2015, but didn't actually reach the station until August 2024.

== Education ==
Public primary and secondary education is handled by Volusia County Schools.

Public high schools

- Atlantic High School
- DeLand High School
- Deltona High School
- Mainland High School
- New Smyrna Beach High School
- Pine Ridge High School
- Seabreeze High School
- Spruce Creek High School
- T. Dewitt Taylor Middle High School
- University High School
- Volusia High School

Roman Catholic Diocese of Orlando operates area Catholic schools. One of the larger private schools is Father Lopez Catholic High School, the sole Catholic high school in the county.

=== Colleges and universities ===
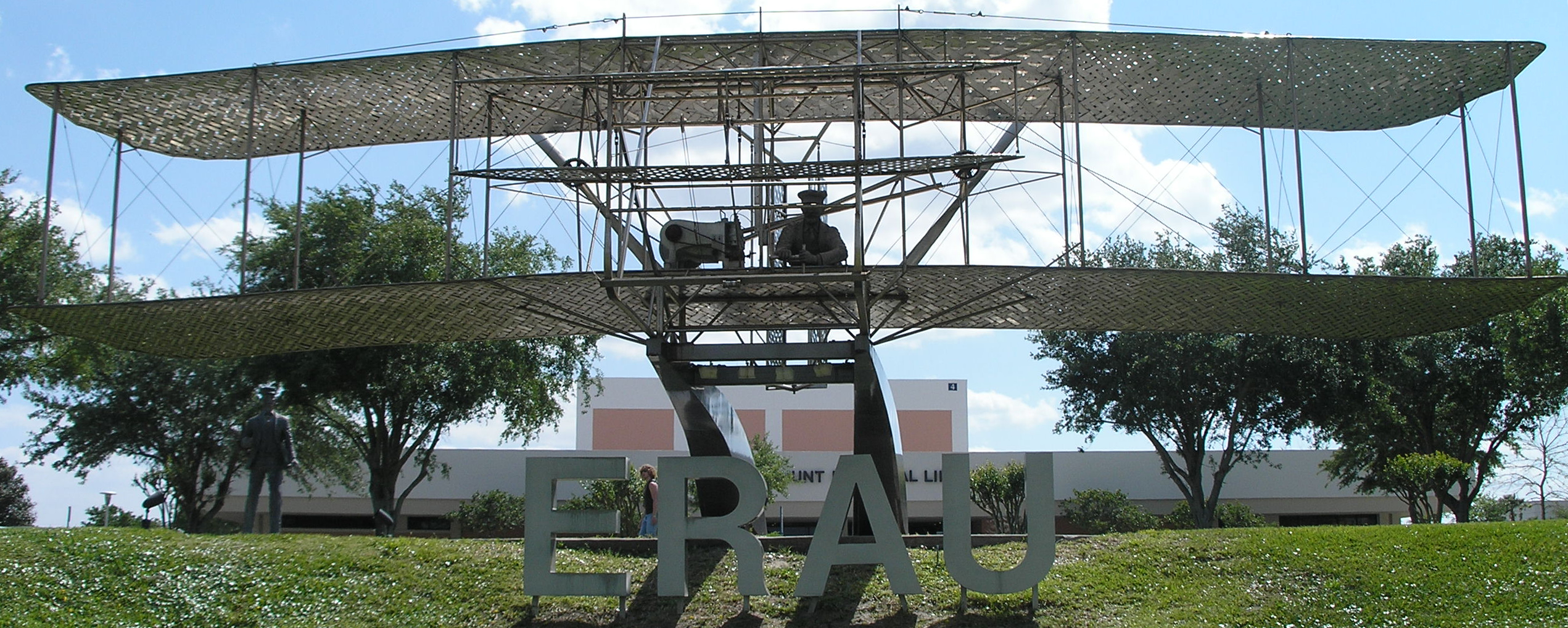
The life-sized Wright Flyer statue at the Embry-Riddle Aeronautical University Daytona Beach campus

- Bethune-Cookman University
- Daytona State College
- Embry-Riddle Aeronautical University
- Keiser University
- Palmer College of Chiropractic
- Stetson University
- University of Central Florida

=== Vocational ===
- Advanced Technology College
- Epic Flight Academy
- International Academy Beauty School
- Florida Technical College
- Palmer College of Chiropractic
- Phoenix East Aviation
- The Airline Academy
- WyoTech

== Media ==
=== Newspapers ===
- The West Volusia Beacon: online edition of news publication covering DeLand and West Volusia
- The Daytona Beach News-Journal: print and online daily newspaper covering all of Volusia County
- The Daytona Times: print and online weekly newspaper covering all of Volusia County
- Orlando Sentinel: newspaper and news site based in Orlando with a bureau covering Volusia County
- The Avion Newspaper: student college publication of Embry-Riddle Aeronautical University in Daytona Beach

=== Television ===
Public broadcasting station WDSC-TV is located in Daytona Beach and broadcasts to 10 counties in Central Florida. Television station WESH is allocated to Daytona Beach - Orlando, and its transmission tower is located midway between those two. Otherwise, Volusia County is served by the major TV broadcasting stations in Orlando and Orange County.

=== Radio ===
==== AM ====
- WELE, 1380 AM, Ormond Beach, News/Talk
- WMFJ, 1450 AM, Daytona Beach, Religious
- WNDB, 1150 AM, Daytona Beach, News/Talk/Sports
- WDJZ, 1590 AM, South Daytona, Talk
- WROD, 1340 AM, Daytona Beach, Classic Rock
- WSBB, 1230 AM, New Smyrna Beach, Standards
- WTJV, 1490 AM, DeLand, Spanish Language
- WYND, 1310 AM, DeLand, Religious

==== FM ====
- WAPN, 91.5 FM, Holly Hill, Contemporary Christian
- WAVX-LP, 107.1 FM, Ormond Beach, Contemporary Christian
- WCFB, 94.5 FM, Daytona Beach, Urban Adult Contemporary
- WHOG-FM, 95.7 FM, Ormond-by-the-Sea, Classic Rock
- WIKD-LP, 102.5 FM, Daytona Beach, Free-Format
- WJHM, 101.9 FM, Daytona Beach, Classic Hip Hop
- WJLU, 89.7 FM, New Smyrna Beach, Religious
- WJLU, 97.3 FM, DeLand, Religious
- WKRO-FM, 93.1 FM, Port Orange, Country
- WKTO, 88.9 FM, Edgewater, Religious
- WLGM-LP, 93.9 FM, Edgewater
- WNUE-FM, 98.1 FM, Deltona, Spanish Adult Hits
- WOCL, 105.9 FM, DeLand, Oldies
- WVYB, 103.3 FM, Holly Hill, Top 40

== Communities ==
=== Cities ===
- Daytona Beach
- Daytona Beach Shores
- DeBary
- DeLand
- Deltona
- Edgewater
- Holly Hill
- Lake Helen
- New Smyrna Beach
- Oak Hill
- Orange City
- Ormond Beach
- Port Orange
- South Daytona

=== Towns ===
- Pierson
- Ponce Inlet

=== Census-designated places ===
- DeLand Southwest
- De Leon Springs
- Glencoe
- North DeLand
- Ormond-by-the-Sea
- Samsula-Spruce Creek
- Seville
- West DeLand

=== Other unincorporated communities ===
- Alamana
- Allandale
- Ariel
- Bakerstown
- Barberville
- Beresford
- Bethune Beach
- Blake
- Blue Springs Landing
- Bluffton
- Boden
- Cassadaga
- Cabbage Bluff
- Connersville
- Conrad
- Cow Creek
- Creighton
- Cypress Lake Estates
- Daisy Lake
- Daytona Highridge Estates
- Daytona Park Estates
- Deadman Landing
- DeLand Highlands
- DeLeon Springs Heights
- Edgewater Junction
- Eldora
- Eldridge
- Ellinor Village
- Emporia
- Enterprise
- Farmton
- Fatio
- Fort Florida
- Glenwood
- Halifax Estates
- Harbor Oaks
- Hucomer
- Isleboro
- Kalamazoo
- Lake Ashby Shores
- Lemon Bluff
- Maytown
- Mission City
- Mound Grove
- National Gardens, Florida
- Orange City Hills
- Ortona
- Osteen
- Packwood Place
- Pennichaw
- Riverside
- Seabreeze
- Senyah
- Stone Island
- Sugar Mill Estates
- Tomoka Estates
- Valdez
- Volusia
- Wilbur By-The-Sea

== See also ==
- National Register of Historic Places listings in Volusia County, Florida
- Volusianus—Roman emperor
