= 2020 Volusia County Chair election =

- August 18, 2020; November 3, 2020
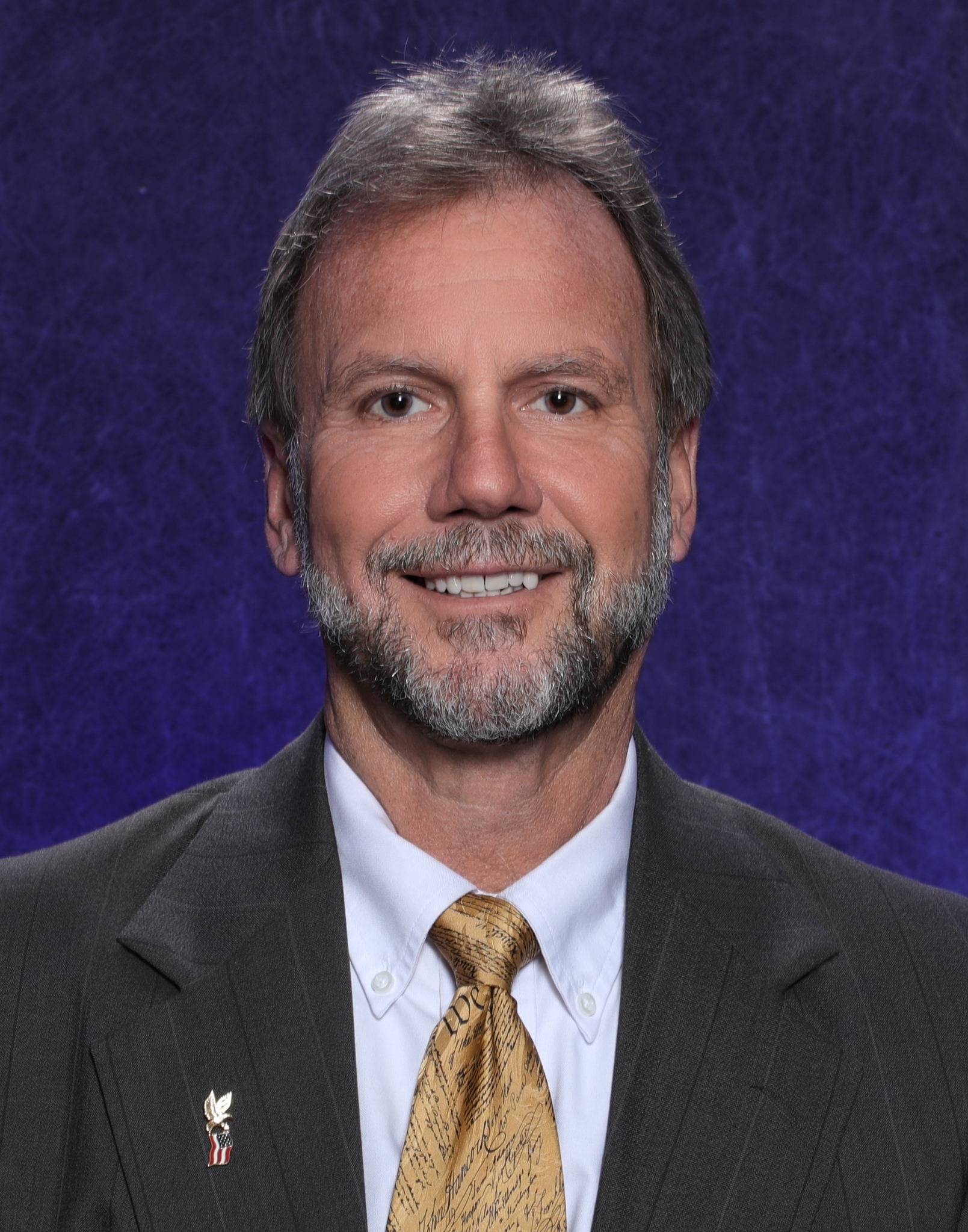

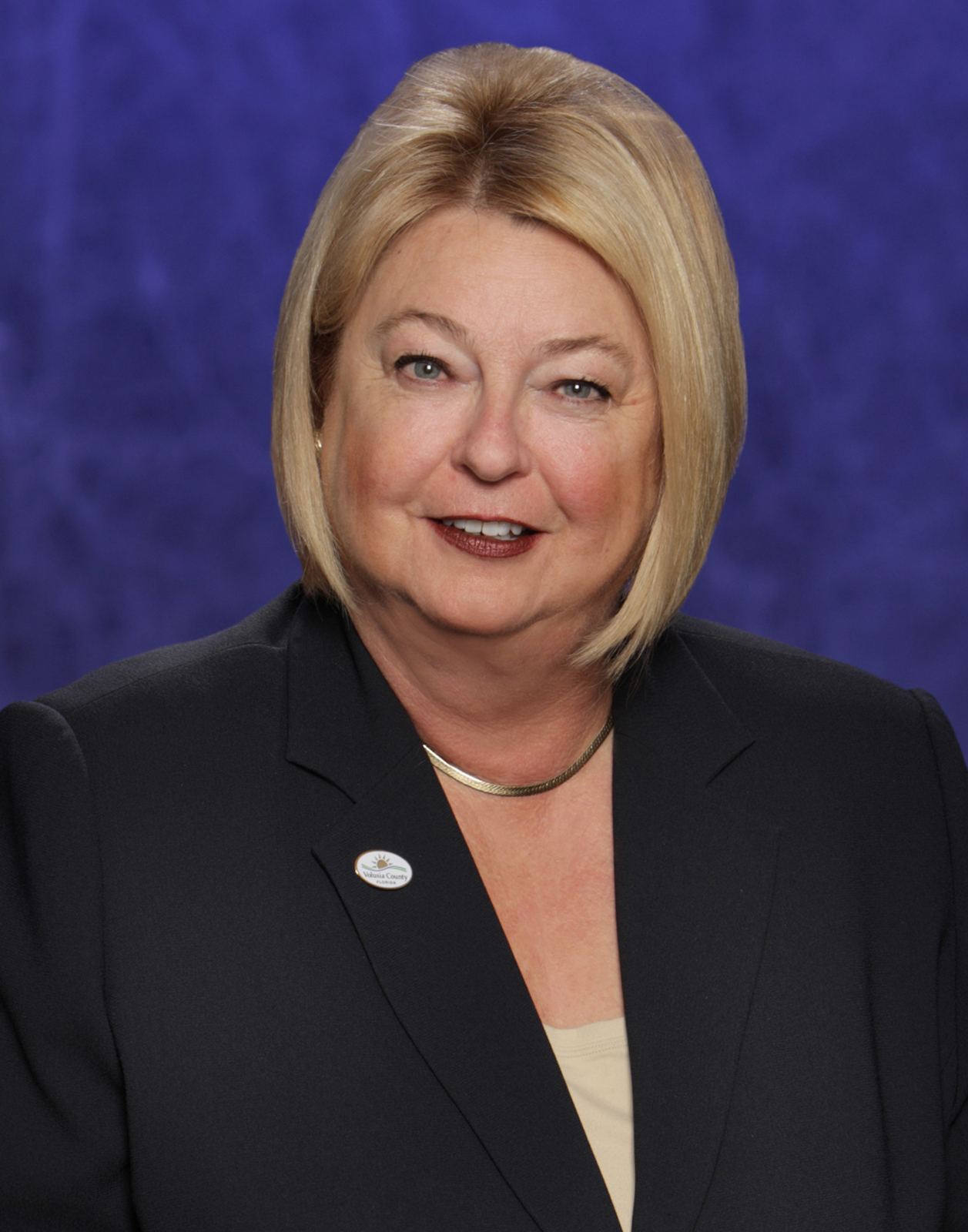

Candidate	Jeff Brower	Deb Denys	Gerard Witman
First round	45,811; 44.85%	41,093; 40.23%	15,246; 14.93%
Runoff	150,827; 57.55%	111,240; 42.45%	Eliminated
County Chair before election
Ed Kelley
Nonpartisan
Elected County Chair
Jeff Brower
Nonpartisan

The 2020 Volusia County Chair election was held on November 3, 2020, following a primary election on August 18, 2020, to elect the Volusia County Chair. Incumbent County Chair Ed Kelley, who was first elected in 2016, initially announced that he would seek re-election, but ultimately declined to seek re-election to a second term.

Three candidates ran to succeed Kelley: County Councilwoman Deb Denys, farmer Jeff Brower, and retiree Gerard Witman. Brower placed first in the primary, winning 45 percent of the vote to Denys's 40 percent, and they advanced to the general election. Brower defeated Denys by a wide margin, winning his first term, 58–42 percent.

== Primary election ==
=== Candidates ===
- Jeff Brower, DeLeon Springs farmer, 2018 County Council candidate
- Deb Denys, Volusia County Councilwoman (2013–2021), Volusia County School Board member (2008–2012)
- Gerard Witman, DeLand retiree

=== Results ===
Primary election results
Party	Candidate	Votes	%
Nonpartisan	Jeff Brower	45,811	44.85%
Nonpartisan	Deb Denys	41,093	40.23%
Nonpartisan	Gerard Witman	15,246	14.93%
Total votes		102,150	100.00%

== Runoff election ==
=== Results ===
2020 Volusia County Chair election results
Party	Candidate	Votes	%
Nonpartisan	Jeff Brower	150,827	57.55%
Nonpartisan	Deb Denys	111,240	42.45%
Total votes		262,067	100.00%
