= 2012 Volusia County Chair election =

- August 14, 2012; November 6, 2012
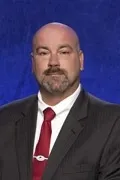

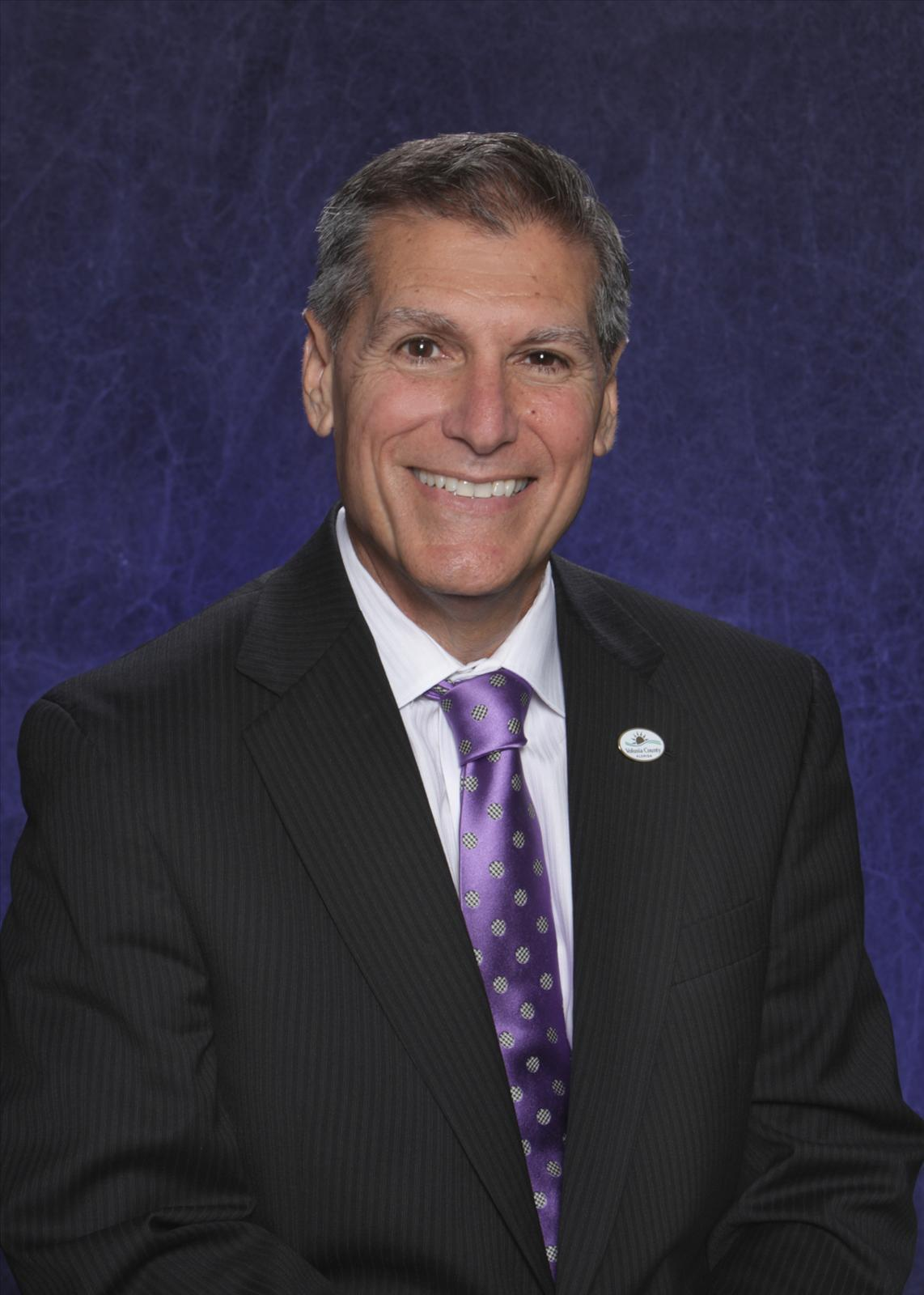

Candidate	Jason Davis	Carl Persis	Ted Doran
Alliance	Republican	Democratic	Democratic
First round	22,902; 32.95%	27,991; 40.27%	18,618; 26.78%
Runoff	105,997; 55.39%	85,357; 44.61%	Eliminated
County Chair before election
Frank Bruno
Nonpartisan
Elected County Chair
Jason Davis
Nonpartisan

The 2012 Volusia County Chair election was held on November 6, 2012, following a primary election on August 14, 2012, to elect the Volusia County chair. Incumbent County Chair Frank Bruno was term-limited and could not seek a third consecutive term. Three candidates ran to succeed him: County Councilman Carl Persis, U.S. Army veteran Jason Davis, and school board attorney Ted Doran. Though the race was formally non-partisan, Persis and Doran were Democrats and Davis was a Republican. In the primary election, Persis placed first, winning 40 percent of the vote. Davis defeated Doran, 33–27 percent, for second place, and advanced to the general election against Persis.

In the general election, Persis emerged as the frontrunner, though he faced an investigation by the Florida Elections Commission for receiving campaign contributions in excess of the legal limits. In the general election, Davis defeated Persis in an upset victory, winning 55 percent of the vote to Persis's 45 percent.

== Primary election ==
=== Candidates ===
- Carl Persis, Volusia County Councilman from the 4th district (2005–2012), retired high school principal
- Jason Davis, U.S. Army veteran, 2008 Republican candidate for the U.S. House of Representatives
- Ted Doran, Volusia County School Board attorney

=== Results ===
Primary election results
Party	Candidate	Votes	%
Nonpartisan	Carl Persis	27,991	40.27%
Nonpartisan	Jason Davis	22,902	32.95%
Nonpartisan	Ted Doran	18,618	26.78%
Total votes		69,511	100.00%

== Runoff election ==
=== Results ===
2012 Volusia County Chair election results
Party	Candidate	Votes	%
Nonpartisan	Jason Davis	105,997	55.39%
Nonpartisan	Carl Persis	85,357	44.61%
Total votes		191,354	100.00%
