= 2024 Volusia County Chair election =

- August 20, 2024; November 5, 2024
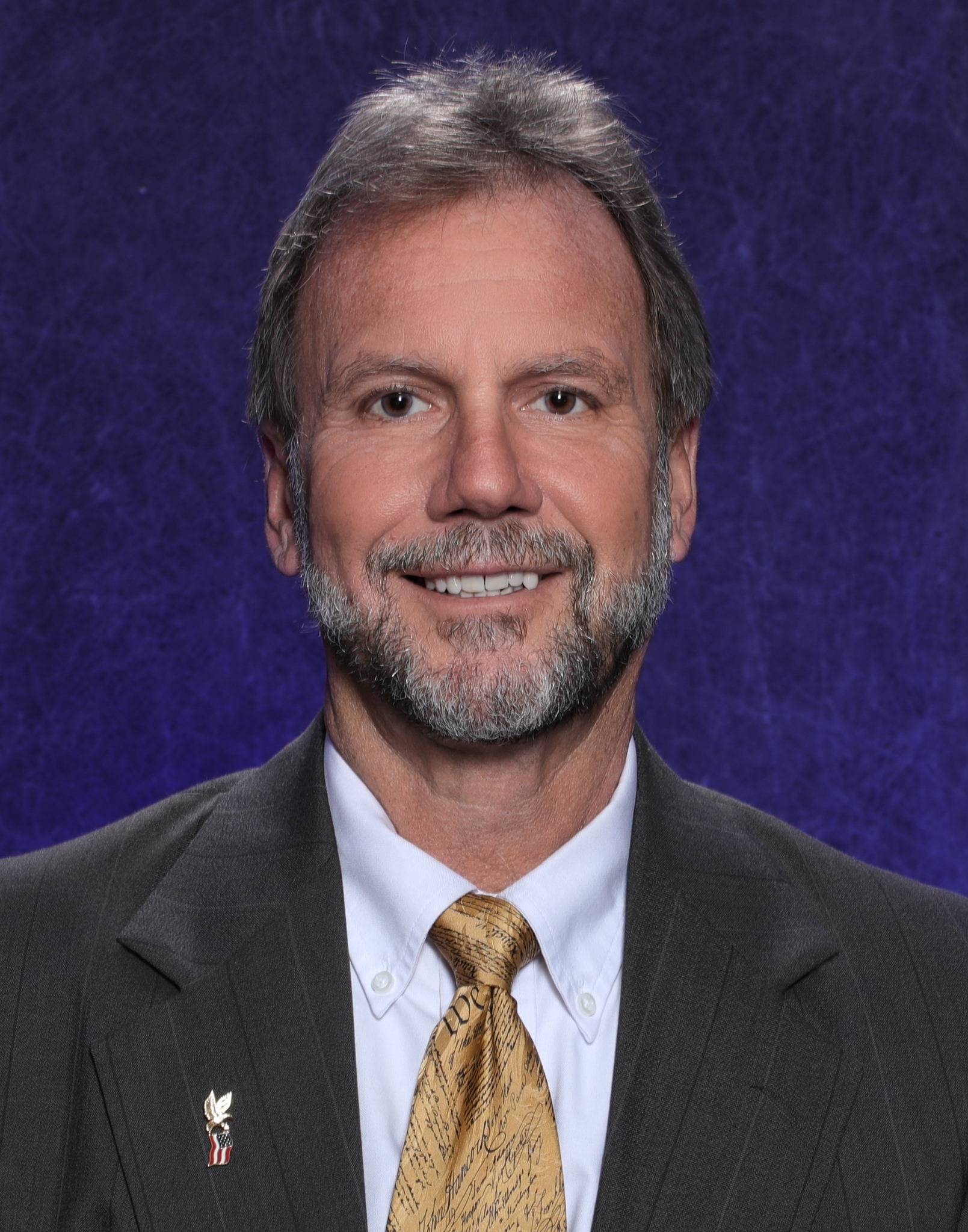

Candidate	Jeff Brower	Randy Dye
First round	35,592; 42.10%	23,429; 27.71%
Runoff	139,313; 51.43%	131,584; 48.57%
Candidate	Deb Denys	Don Burnett
First round	14,696; 17.38%	10,823; 12.80%
Runoff	Eliminated	Eliminated
County Chair before election
Jeff Brower
Nonpartisan
Elected County Chair
Jeff Brower
Nonpartisan

The 2024 Volusia County Chair election took place on November 5, 2024, following a primary election on August 20, 2024. Incumbent County Chair Jeff Brower ran for re-election to a second term. He was challenged by businessman Randy Dye; former County Councilmember Deb Denys, who ran against him in 2020; and Port Orange Mayor Don Burnett. Brower placed first in the primary, winning 42 percent of the vote. Dye placed second with 27 percent, defeating Denys, who won 17 percent, and Burnett, who won 13 percent, and advanced to the general election against Brower. In the general election, Brower narrowly defeated Dye to win his second term, receiving 51 percent of the vote to Dye's 49 percent.

== Primary election ==
=== Candidates ===
- Jeff Brower, incumbent County Executive
- Randy Dye, businessman
- Deb Denys, former County Councilmember, 2020 candidate for County Chair
- Don Burnett, Mayor of Port Orange

=== Results ===
Primary election results
Party	Candidate	Votes	%
Nonpartisan	Jeff Brower (inc.)	35,592	42.10%
Nonpartisan	Randy Dye	23,429	27.71%
Nonpartisan	Deb Denys	14,696	17.38%
Nonpartisan	Don Burnett	10,823	12.80%
Total votes		84,540	100.00%

== Runoff election ==
=== Results ===
2024 Volusia County Chair election results
Party	Candidate	Votes	%
Nonpartisan	Jeff Brown (inc.)	139,313	51.43%
Nonpartisan	Randy Dye	131,584	48.57%
Total votes		270,897	100.00%
