= 2016 Volusia County Chair election =

- August 30, 2016; November 8, 2016
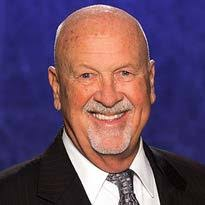

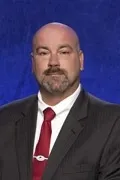

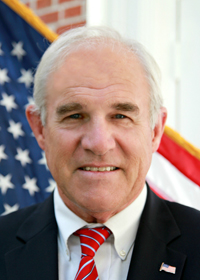
Candidate	Ed Kelley	Jason Davis
First round	38,985; 47.01%	19,233; 23.19%
Runoff	129,846; 61.92%	79,854; 38.08%
Candidate	Greg Gimbert	Tom Laputka
First round	14,110; 17.02%	10,596; 12.78%
Runoff	Eliminated	Eliminated
County Chair before election
Jason Davis
Nonpartisan
Elected County Chair
Ed Kelley
Nonpartisan

The 2016 Volusia County Chair election was held on November 8, 2016, following a primary election on August 30, 2016, to elect the Volusia County Chair. Incumbent County Chair Jason Davis ran for re-election to a second term, and was challenged by three opponents: Ormond Beach Mayor Ed Kelley, Orange City Mayor Tom Laputka, and activist Greg Gimbert. Though the race was formally nonpartisan, all four candidates were Republicans. In the primary election, Kelley placed first by a wide margin, winning 47 percent of the vote. Davis placed second, winning 23 percent of the vote to Gimbert's 17 percent and Laputka's 13 percent.

In the general election, Kelley defeated Davis in a landslide victory, winning 62 percent of the vote to Davis's 38 percent.

== Primary election ==
=== Candidates ===
- Ed Kelley, Mayor of Ormond Beach (2010–2016)
- Jason Davis, 2nd Volusia County Chair (2013–2017)
- Greg Gimbert, beach driving activist
- Tom Laputka, Mayor of Orange City (2011–2016), Orange City Councilman (2005–2011)

=== Results ===
Primary election results
Party	Candidate	Votes	%
Nonpartisan	Ed Kelley	38,985	47.01%
Nonpartisan	Jason Davis (inc.)	19,233	23.19%
Nonpartisan	Greg Gimbert	14,110	17.02%
Nonpartisan	Tom Laputka	10,596	12.78%
Total votes		82,924	100.00%

== Runoff election ==
=== Results ===
2016 Volusia County Chair election results
Party	Candidate	Votes	%
Nonpartisan	Ed Kelley	129,846	61.92%
Nonpartisan	Jason Davis (inc.)	79,854	38.08%
Total votes		209,700	100.00%
