= Kendall Bridge =

Concrete bridge in the Sittee River, Belize

Coordinates: 16.815274°N 88.378252°W

New Kendall Bridge is a concrete bridge that links Kendall village in the Sittee River, Belize. The project was funded by the Government of Belize and the Caribbean Bank. The construction started in 2010 and was successfully completed in a period of 24 months by CISCO Constructions in August 2012, at a cost of 11.9 million Belize dollars. The bridge has a length of 0.13 kilometers. The Bridge stands approximately 10 feet higher than the old Ferro-concrete structure and consists of a "90 meter span steel truss supporting reinforcement concrete deck founded on driven piles", much better than the one before.

Kendall Bridge, located at mile 13 on the Southern Highway in Stann Creek District was designed by Beca International Consultants Limited, a New Zealand-based firm after the devastating Tropical Storm Arthur in the season 2008. "A dreadful flood devastated the Pomona valley; causing the death of 7 Belizeans and wiped the old Kendal Ferro-Concrete Bridge.
