= WSBB =

WSBB could refer to:

- WSBB (AM), a radio station (1230 AM) licensed to serve New Smyrna Beach, Florida, United States
- WSBB-FM, a radio station (95.5 FM) licensed to serve Doraville, Georgia, United States
