= 2004 Volusia County Chair election =

- August 31, 2004
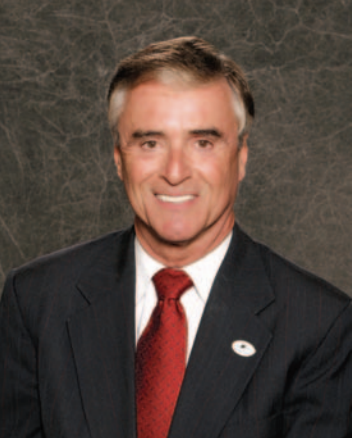

Candidate	Frank Bruno	Roy Schleicher	Larry J. Stephens
Popular vote	28,382	15,554	7,516
Percentage	55.16%	30.23%	14.61%
County Chair before election
Position established
Elected County Chair
Frank Bruno
Nonpartisan

The 2004 Volusia County Chair election took place on August 31, 2004. The 2004 election was the first election for the position after voters approved an amendment to the home rule charter in 2002 that established the position of County Chair.

County Councilmember Frank Bruno and Roy Schleicher, a former County Councilmember, entered the race as frontrunners, and were joined at the filing deadline by consultant Larry Stephens. Despite suspicion that Stephens entered the race as a spoiler candidate to hurt Bruno, Bruno ended up winning the race outright at the primary election, winning 55 percent of the vote to Schleicher's 30 percent and Stephens's 15 percent, avoiding the need for a runoff election.

== Primary election ==
=== Candidates ===
- Frank Bruno, County Councilmember
- Roy Schleicher, businessman, former Executive Director of the Volusia Council of Governments, former County Councilmember
- Larry Stephens, economic development consultant

==== Declined ====
- Joe Benedict, businessman, former County Councilmember

=== Results ===
2004 Volusia County Chair election results
Party	Candidate	Votes	%
Nonpartisan	Frank Bruno	28,382	55.16%
Nonpartisan	Roy Schleicher	15,554	30.23%
Nonpartisan	Larry Stephens	7,516	14.61%
Total votes		51,452	100.00%
