= WLOV-FM =

Radio station in Florida, US

- Daytona Beach Shores, Florida; United States
- Broadcast area: Daytona Beach
- Frequency: 99.5 MHz
- Branding: 99.5 WLOV

Programming
- Format: Classic hits

Ownership
- Owner: Southern Stone Communications; (Southern Broadcasting of Pensacola, Inc.)
- Sister stations: WHOG-FM, WKRO-FM, WNDB, WVYB

History
- First air date: March 21, 2012
- Call sign meaning: "Love"

Technical information
- Licensing authority: FCC
- Facility ID: 189546
- Class: A
- ERP: 5,500 watts
- HAAT: 104 meters (341 ft)
- Transmitter coordinates: 29°14′11.00″N 81°04′22.00″W

Links
- Public license information: Public file; LMS
- Webcast: Listen Live
- Website: 995wlov.com

WLOV-FM (99.5 FM) is a commercial FM radio station licensed to Daytona Beach Shores, Florida and serving the Daytona Beach area. The station is owned by Southern Stone Communications and broadcasts a classic hits radio format as "Love 99.5, Daytona's Greatest Hits". The station carries the syndicated program "Intelligence for Your Life with John Tesh" in morning drive time.

WLOV-FM has an effective radiated power (ERP) of 5,500 watts. The radio studios and transmitter are on LPGA Boulevard in Daytona Beach.

== History ==
Susan Hall bought WLOV-FM before it made it to the airwaves in a Federal Communications Commission auction. The price tag was $416,000, including a "new entrant bidding credit".

WLOV-FM signed on the air on March 21, 2012. In its first 99 days, there were no commercials or on-air personalities. It was part of the Black Crow group. Black Crow also owned classic rock 95.7 WHOG-FM.

Effective March 7, 2019, Susan Hall sold WLOV-FM to Paul Stone's Southern Stone Communications for $650,000.
