= WTJV =

Simulcasts WSBB, New Smyrna Beach
- DeLand, Florida; United States
- Broadcast area: Daytona Beach area
- Frequency: 1490 kHz

Programming
- Format: Adult standards

Ownership
- Owner: J & V Communications, Inc.

History
- First air date: September 10, 1948; 77 years ago as WDLF
- Former call signs: WDLF (1948); WJBS (1949–1959); WETO (1959); WJBS (after WETO up to 1980); WXVQ (1980–2000); WNDA (2000–2005)

Technical information
- Licensing authority: FCC
- Facility ID: 25123
- Class: C
- Power: 1,000 watts
- Transmitter coordinates: 29°1′5.00″N 81°17′59.00″W

Links
- Public license information: Public file; LMS
- Webcast: Listen Live
- Website: MyAm1230.com

WTJV (1490 AM) is a radio station licensed to DeLand, Florida and serving the Daytona Beach area. WTJV is owned by J & V Communications, Inc.

WTJV simulcasts WSBB 1230 AM in New Smyrna Beach. The two stations broadcast an Adult Standards radio format. Both stations carry The Dave Ramsey Show on weekday afternoons. The station is an affiliate of Radio Network News.

== History ==
On September 10, 1948, the station signed on the air as WDLF. Stetson University bought the station the following year and changed the call sign to WJBS, reflecting the initials of university founder John B. Stetson. (The university would again own the station between 1984 and 1987.)

Stetson sold the station to Rudi Gresham's WXVQ, Inc. which changed the calls to WETO and the format to adult standards. After WETO, the station again became WJBS for a time before taking the call letters WXVQ (XV being the Roman numeral 15) in 1980. In 1984, Stetson re-bought WJBS (see above) and sold it to Great Lakes Broadcasting in 1987 for $325,000, when the station adopted an oldies format.

Another sale came in 1991, this time for $175,000 to the Green Broadcast Group, and the station flipped to a Talk radio format that same year. Daytona Beach broadcasting group Black Crow bought the station in 2000 to simulcast its own talk station, 1150 WNDB. WXVQ was changed to WNDA. The station was sold again in 2005 to Spanish language broadcaster J&V Communications which changed the call sign to the current WTJV.

On September 4, 2009, a truck backed into one of the tower's guy wires, taking the tower down and knocking the station off the air. No one was injured, but three vehicles were damaged. The station was silent until March 2010, when J&V Communications replaced the fallen tower with an 85-foot Valcom antenna and went back on air.
