= Motor Racing Network =

American radio network covering motor racing events

- Type: Radio network
- Country: United States

Ownership
- Parent: NASCAR Holdings
- Key people: Bill France Sr. (founder); Ken Squier (network founder)

History
- Founded: 1970, Concord, North Carolina
- Launch date: 1970

Coverage
- Stations: 328

Links
- Website: mrn.com

Motor Racing Network (MRN) is an American radio network that syndicates broadcasts of auto racing events, particularly NASCAR. MRN was founded in 1970 by NASCAR founder Bill France Sr. and broadcaster Ken Squier, and is a wholly owned subsidiary of NASCAR. Its first broadcast was the 1970 Daytona 500.

MRN is one of the two main radio broadcasters of the NASCAR Cup Series and O'Reilly Auto Parts Series, covering events held at tracks owned by NASCAR, along with Pocono Raceway and Gateway Motorsports Park. It also broadcasts the NASCAR All-Star Race. Almost all of the remaining Cup and Xfinity races are broadcast by the Speedway Motorsports-owned Performance Racing Network (PRN), besides the Brickyard 400 (which is broadcast by the Indianapolis Motor Speedway Radio Network in association with PRN); many stations have affiliations with both MRN and PRN in order to air a full NASCAR schedule. PRN and MRN, as of 2025, also collaborate as the NASCAR Racing Network to carry all NASCAR Craftsman Truck Series events, with distribution handled by MRN (although clearance of Xfinity and Truck races varies by station). All races are also carried on Sirius XM NASCAR Radio.

In addition to NASCAR races, MRN broadcasts the majority of the ARCA Menards Series and once had exclusive coverage of the United SportsCar Championship (IMSA now does the radio broadcasts) and Formula One, including the United States Grand Prix, which returned in the 2012 season at the Circuit of the Americas in Austin, Texas and offers other race related programs.

The MRN flagship station is WNDB, which serves Daytona Beach, Florida. The network headquarters moved near Charlotte, North Carolina in 2008.

== Programs ==
While MRN's primary role is doing radio broadcasts of NASCAR races, they also produce daily radio programs that are carried by some of their affiliates. They also stream the programs on their website and offer most shows as a podcast on Apple iTunes.

- Busch Pole Updates (Short reports broadcast during NASCAR Cup Series qualifying; full event broadcast available on some affiliates, SiriusXM Satellite Radio and through NASCAR.com's "Track Pass" subscription service).
- NASCAR Today (Twice daily three-minute reports, one around noon and one late afternoon/early evening with the hosts of MRN Outloud!).
- MRN Outloud! (Extended review of the past weekend's racing action with Woody Cain and Joey Meier). ^{Podcast}
- Rip The Fence (Former Voices of USAC Dillon Welch and Tyler Burnett talk Silver Crown, Midgets and Traditional Non-Winged Sprint Car Racing). ^{Podcast}
- American Racing Snobs (Eric Morse and Tony Rizzuti discuss the world of racing with an emphasis on the Formula 1 World Championship, plus other disciplines such as IndyCar and IMSA). ^{Podcast}
- Sunday Money (NASCAR Cup Series driver Corey LaJoie, FOX Sports personality Daryl Motte and MRN's own Lauren Fox bring you tales from both on and off the racetrack). ^{Podcast}
- Winged Nation (Winged sprint car news and interviews hosted by Erin Evernham and Steve Post). ^{Podcast}
- NASCAR Live (Tuesday evening call-in show hosted by Mike Bagley). ^{Podcast}
- MRN Crew Call (Motor Racing Network Host Rocko Williams talks to the guys that sit atop the pit boxes and jump over the wall). ^{Podcast}
- The Straightline (NHRA news and interviews hosted by Doug Herbert and Ralph Sheheen). ^{Podcast}
- NASCAR Coast to Coast (NASCAR local, regional and international talk with Hannah Newhouse and Kyle Rickey). ^{Podcast}
- MRN Classic Races (Rebroadcasts of classic races (formerly known as Flashback Friday and Throwback Thursday)). ^{Podcast}
- Ned Jarrett's World of Racing (Two-minute weekday morning commentary by two-time Grand National Series champion and former MRN pit reporter Ned Jarrett, hosted by Suzy Armstrong).

Three MRN announcers also host daily call-in shows on Sirius XM NASCAR Radio channel 90 year round. Mike Bagley and Pete Pistone co-host The Morning Drive Monday through Friday from 7:00 to 11:00 a.m. Eastern time. Dave Moody hosts Sirius XM Speedway from 3:00 to 7:00 p.m. Monday through Friday. Moody was also the first NASCAR personality to host a show on satellite radio back in 2003 on Sirius Satellite Radio despite the fact NASCAR races and other NASCAR-related shows were exclusively on XM Satellite Radio. This changed on January 1, 2007 when MRN's Barney Hall announced the launch of Sirius XM NASCAR Radio on Sirius XM.

== Affiliate stations ==
MRN has about 600 affiliate stations, including:

Alabama

- Birmingham: WYDE / WXJC-FM

Arizona

- Phoenix: KGME

Delaware

- Dover: WDSD

Florida

- Daytona Beach: WNDB / WKRO-FM
- Miami/Fort Lauderdale/West Palm Beach: WMIA-FM 93.9 HD3

Iowa

- Decorah: KVIK

Kentucky

- Calvert City: WCCK
- Lexington: WLXO

Michigan

- Detroit: WDFN

Minnesota

- Buffalo: KRWC

Missouri

- Kansas City: WHB

New Hampshire

- Lebanon: WXXK

New York

- Newark: WACK, WUUF

North Carolina

- Charlotte: WEND

Ohio

- Newark: WCLT-FM
- Sandusky: WKFM

Texas

- Dallas: KRLD (AM) / KRLD-FM

Virginia

- Bristol: WWTB / WXBQ-FM
- Richmond: WRNL, WRVA (AM)
- Norfolk: WTAR (except during Washington Commanders seasons in September–November)
- Stanleytown: WZBB
- Danville: WAKG

== Announcers ==
=== Current ===
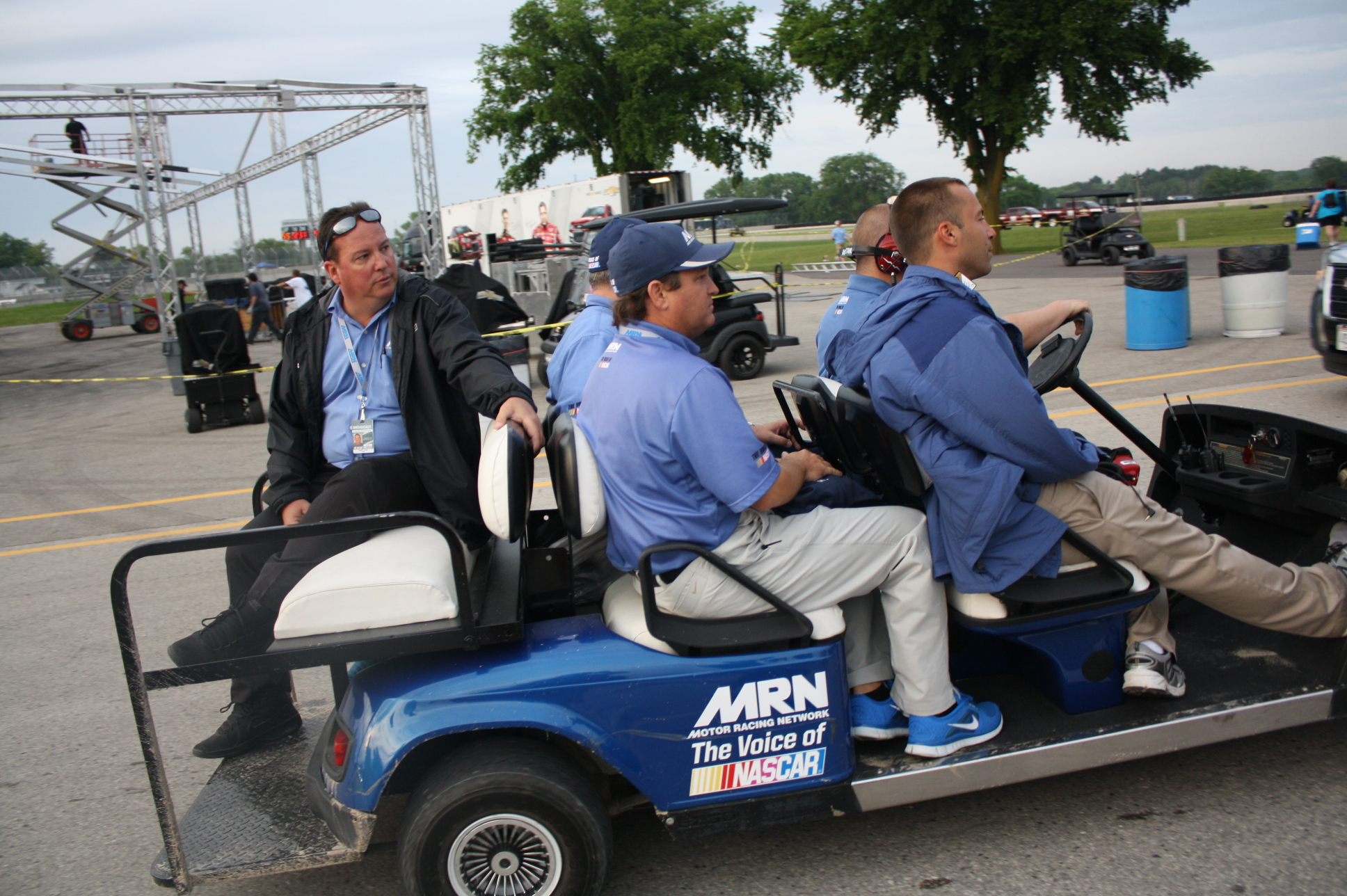
2013 Motor Racing Network announcers (from left to right) Buddy Long, Kurt Becker, Alex Hayden, Mike Bagley and Kyle Rickey riding in a golf cart at Road America.

==== Booth announcers ====
===== Cup, Xfinity and Trucks =====
- Alex Hayden (Lead booth announcer, 2019–present)
- Mike Bagley (booth announcer, 2025–present)
- Rusty Wallace (booth announcer, 2015–present)
- Todd Gordon (booth announcer, 2022–present)
- Kurt Becker (Stand-Alone Booth Announcer)
- Dan Hubbard (Stand-Alone Booth Announcer)
- Kyle Rickey (Stand-Alone Booth Announcer)

==== Turn announcers ====
- Dave Moody (Turn announcer)
- Tim Catalfamo (Turn announcer)
- Kyle Rickey (Turn Announcer)
- Dan Hubbard (Lead West Coast Turn announcer, Stand-Alone Events Booth Announcer)
- Kurt Becker (Turn announcer)
- Chris Wilner (Turn announcer)
- Eric Morse (Turn announcer)
- Tony Bokhoven (Turn announcer)
- Nathan Prouty (Turn announcer)

==== Pit reporters ====
- Steve Post (Lead Pit reporter).
- Chris Wilner (Pit Reporter/Turn Announcer)
- Jason Toy (Pit Reporter/Turn Announcer)
- Hannah Newhouse (Pit reporter)
- Georgia Henneberry (Pit reporter)
- Alex Weaver (Pit reporter)
- Jacklyn Drake (Pit reporter)
- Paul Small (Pit reporter)
- Alan Cavanna (Pit reporter)
- Brad Gillie (Pit reporter)
- Brienne Pedigo (Pit reporter)
- Dillon Welch (Pit reporter)
- Wendy Venturini (Pit Reporter)
- Kim Coon (Pit Reporter)

=== Former ===
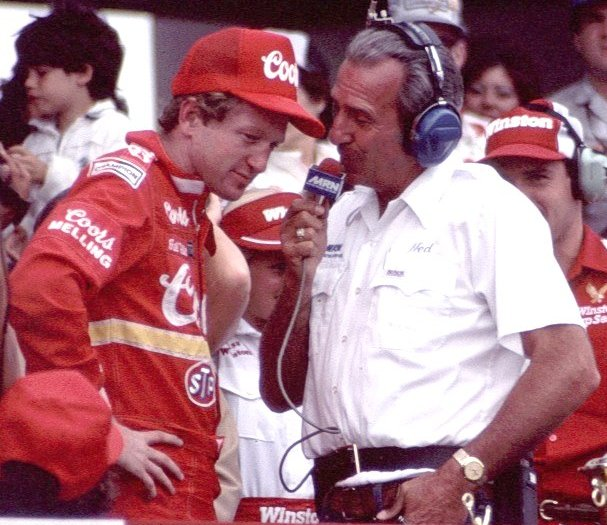
MRN's Ned Jarrett interviewing Bill Elliott after a victory

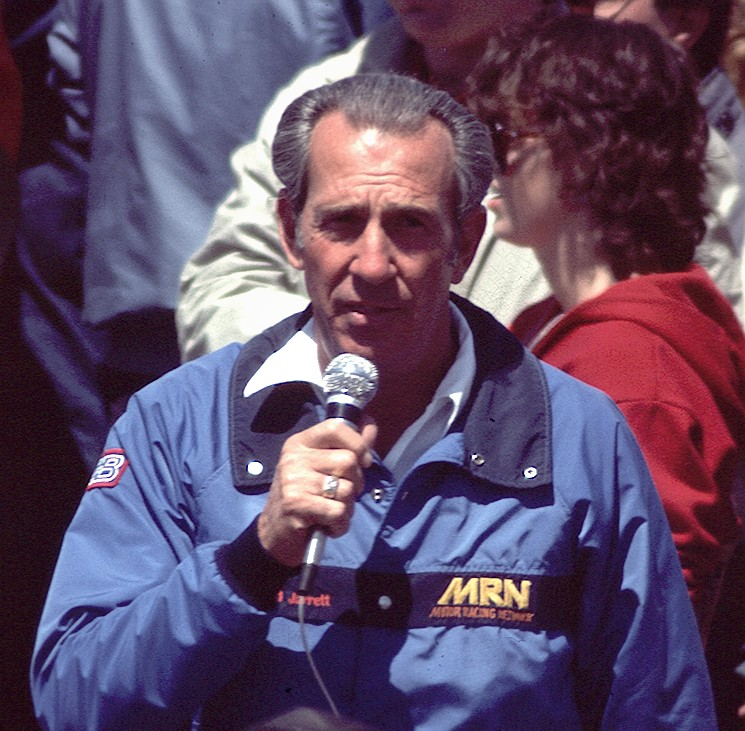
Ned Jarrett during his days as an MRN pit reporter

- Adam Alexander (Pit reporter 2000-2006, Current lead broadcaster for the Cup series on Amazon Prime and TNT and the Oreilly Series races on The CW).
- Fred Armstrong (Turn announcer, Later Production Director).
- Rick Benjamin
- Allen Bestwick (Turn announcer 1988-95, lead booth announcer 1996-2000, fill-in booth announcer for 2003 Speedweeks, was lead announcer for NASCAR coverage on ABC and ESPN, worked IndyCar races covered by ABC, plus covers college football and college basketball for ESPN. Was a race announcer then pit reporter for NASCAR on NBC and NASCAR on TNT).
- Bill Bowser (Turn announcer, fill-in booth and pit reporter 1970-1991)
- Woody Cain (Pit reporter, turn announcer, NASCAR Today (daily news show) producer/host, also Co-Host of NASCAR Live Pre-Race Show)
- Kenny Campbell (Fill-in booth announcer, 1970s)
- Dave Despain (Turn announcer in the 1970s, worked on ESPN and CBS racecasts in the 1980s-90s. Hosted ESPN's NASCAR 2day pre-race show from 1994 to 2000, Wind Tunnel from 2003 to 2013 and NASCAR Inside Nextel Cup from 2005 to 2007 on Speed; formally hosted The Dave Despain Show on MAVTV).
- Eli Gold (co-anchor, turn announcer, pit reporter, formally the host of NASCAR Live; resigned in 2016).
- Barney Hall (Booth announcer, retired in 2014 after 44 years involved in MRN, died in 2016).
- Ned Jarrett (Former color analyst for CBS Sports's and ESPN's NASCAR coverage).
- Mike Joy (Turn announcer 1976-1979, co-anchor and exec producer 1980-84, pit reporter 1985-87. Broadcast NASCAR on TV for CBS, ESPN, TBS, TNN, SETN, MRN. Lead announcer for Fox Sports' NASCAR coverage 2001–present).
- Bob Jenkins (Turn announcer in the late 1970s, worked NASCAR telecasts for ESPN for 1981-2000 and IndyCar Series races for NBCSN from 2009 to 2012, worked the Public Address system at the Indianapolis Motor Speedway from 2011 to 2020, died in 2021)
- Paul Page (Turn announcer 1977 Michigan, IndyCar on NBC, ABC, ESPN, Host Play by Play of the Indianapolis 500 1977-2004 and 2014-2016)
- Dustin Long (Pit reporter and MRN.com writer, now at NBC Sports)
- Mike Massaro (Was a host of ESPN2's NASCAR Now, former pit reporter on ESPN/ABC's coverage and NASCAR on NBC, former NASCAR reporter for SportsCenter).
- Gary Montgomery (pit reporter)
- Joe Moore (Former Lead booth announcer, 2001-2018, co-host of Raceline on MAVTV)
- Rick Lewis (Studio announcer, died in 2001).
- Jerry Punch (Former lead announcer for ESPN/ABC's NASCAR coverage, pit reporter for the networks).
- Charlie Roberts (Founder of MotorNet radio, TV pit announcer on Superstation WTBS, and track announcer at Daytona, Pocono, Dover Downs, and Wall Stadium.)
- Jeff Striegle (Booth announcer, 2013–2024, utility reporter/announcer 1997-2012)
- Ken Squier (CBS Sports' Motorsports editor. Anchored CBS Daytona 500 coverage from 1979 to 1997).
- Hermie Sadler (Pit reporter for the 2000 spring Richmond race).
- Jim Tretow (Turn announcer)
