= Tom Laputka =

American football player and politician (born 1947)

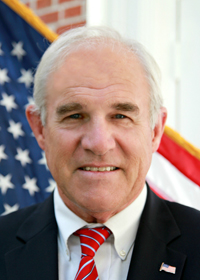

Mayor of Orange City
- In office November 2011 – November 2016
- Preceded by: Harley Strickland
- Succeeded by: Gary A. Blair

Councilman of Orange City District 6
- In office November 2005 – November 2011

Personal details
- Born: December 30, 1947 (age 78) Philadelphia, Pennsylvania, U.S.
- Party: Republican
- Spouse: Sondra M. "Gail" Laputka
- Children: 5
- Education: Southern Illinois University
- Football career

Profile
- Position: Defensive end

Personal information
- Listed height: 6 ft 3 in (1.91 m)
- Listed weight: 255 lb (116 kg)

Career information
- College: Southern Illinois
- NFL draft: 1972: 11th round, 279th overall pick

Career history
- 1971–1973: Ottawa Rough Riders
- 1975–1976: Edmonton Eskimos
- 1974: Philadelphia Bell

Awards and highlights
- 2× Grey Cup champion (1973, 1975)

Thomas W. Laputka (born December 30, 1947) is an American former gridiron football player who played for the Ottawa Rough Riders and Edmonton Eskimos. He won the Grey Cup with Ottawa in 1973, and with Edmonton in 1975. He played college football at Southern Illinois University. He is also a retired businessman and served as a councilman and in 2011 was elected mayor of Orange City, Florida, serving through the end of 2016.

== Political career ==
Laputka served as a councilman representing District 6; he decided to run for mayor in 2011. He was able to win in the general election defeating the incumbent mayor Harley Strickland. He served as the mayor of Orange City, Florida from November 2011 – 2016 after resigning from office to run for Volusia County Chairman; against three other opponents in the race (incumbent chairman Jason Davis, Greg Gimbert of Daytona Beacon, and Ormond Beach mayor Ed Kelley). Later in the race, he did not win enough votes to make into the general election like Kelly and Davis did that year.
