= Rick Lewis (radio personality) =

American radio announcer

- Born: Winter Haven, Florida
- Died: July 11, 2001; South Daytona, Florida
- Cause of death: Suicide
- Occupation: Radio announcer

Richard Lewis, Sr. (1960 – July 11, 2001) was an American radio announcer. For nearly two decades, Lewis served as the studio voice for the Motor Racing Network (MRN).

== Career ==
Lewis began working for MRN Radio in 1983. His signature voice introduced and closed out hundreds of race broadcasts on over 640 affiliates across North America. He was often credited for starting every race broadcast with the signature intro `M . . . R . . . N . . . radio presents'. His segments would be usually recorded the week before every race at a studio in what is now known as the Daytona 500 Experience, a NASCAR attraction located at Daytona International Speedway.

== Death ==
On July 11, 2001, Lewis was found dead in his home in South Daytona, Florida of an apparent murder-suicide attempt involving his wife, Wanda, whom he shot and wounded. He was 52 years old.
