= WHOG-FM =

- Ormond-By-The-Sea, Florida; United States
- Broadcast area: Daytona Beach metropolitan area
- Frequency: 95.7 MHz (HD Radio)
- Branding: 95.7 The Hog

Programming
- Format: Classic rock
- Subchannels: HD2: Urban contemporary "Hot 94.1 Daytona"; HD3: Talk radio (WNDB simulcast)
- Affiliations: United Stations Radio Networks; Westwood One

Ownership
- Owner: Southern Stone Communications of Florida, LLC
- Sister stations: WKRO-FM, WLOV-FM, WNDB, WVYB

History
- First air date: 1995 (as WNDB-FM)
- Former call signs: WNDB-FM (1995–1996); WTSM (1996–1996)
- Call sign meaning: W HOG (branding)

Technical information
- Licensing authority: FCC
- Facility ID: 24365
- Class: C2
- ERP: 48,000 watts
- HAAT: 100 meters (330 ft)
- Translator: HD2: 94.1 W231CN (Daytona Beach)

Links
- Public license information: Public file; LMS
- Webcast: HD2: Listen live
- Website: 957thehog.com HD2: hotdaytona.com

WHOG-FM (95.7 MHz) is a radio station broadcasting a classic rock format. Licensed to Ormond-By-The-Sea, Florida, the station serves the Daytona Beach metropolitan area. The station is owned by Southern Stone Communications. The radio studios and offices are on LPGA Boulevard in Daytona Beach. WHOG-FM plays a mix of classic rock of the 1970s and 1980s as well as 1990s and early 2000s rock.

The station has an effective radiated power (ERP) of 48,000 watts. The transmitter is off Wesley Street in Daytona Beach. WHOG-FM broadcasts using HD Radio technology. The digital subchannel of WHOG-FM-HD2 plays urban contemporary music, and is known as "Hot 94.1 Daytona". It feeds FM translator W231CN at 94.1 MHz.

== History ==
WHOG was acquired in 1996 from Root Communications as radio station WTSM changing the call letters and format. WTSM was operating as a Westwood One 1970s format station. Black Crow Media would later change its format to classic rock.

In late 2008, WHOG-FM dropped the "Classic Rock" designation and started classifying itself as simply "Rock Radio".

In January 2013, ownership of WHOG-FM was transferred to Southern Stone Communications.
