= WKRO-FM =

Coordinates: 28.8947°N 80.8853°W

- Port Orange, Florida; United States
- Broadcast area: Daytona Beach
- Frequency: 93.1 MHz
- Branding: 93-1 Coast Country

Programming
- Format: Country music
- Affiliations: Premiere Networks; Motor Racing Network

Ownership
- Owner: Southern Stone Communications of Florida, LLC
- Sister stations: WNDB, WHOG-FM, WVYB, WLOV-FM

History
- First air date: 1993 (as WEDG)
- Former call signs: WEDG (1993–1994)
- Call sign meaning: "Crow" (former branding)

Technical information
- Licensing authority: FCC
- Facility ID: 5464
- Class: C3
- ERP: 24,500 watts
- HAAT: 53 meters (174 ft)

Links
- Public license information: Public file; LMS
- Webcast: Listen Live
- Website: 931coast.com

WKRO-FM (93.1 MHz) is a commercial radio station licensed to Port Orange, Florida, broadcasting to the Daytona Beach area. It is owned by Southern Stone Communications and airs a country music radio format branded as "93-1 Coast Country".

WKRO-FM has an effective radiated power (ERP) of 24,500 watts. The transmitter is off Opportunity Court in Daytona Beach, near South Ridgewood Avenue (U.S. Route 1).

== Former formats ==
Signing on in 1993, the station was originally WEDG, "Gold 93" It changed its call sign to WKRO-FM in 1994, then known as "Crow Radio."

- (1993–1995) Oldies
- (1995–2000) Modern Rock
