= WJLU =

Coordinates: 29°00′32″N 80°58′27″W

- New Smyrna Beach, Florida; United States
- Broadcast area: Daytona Beach - New Smyrna Beach - Deltona
- Frequency: 89.7 MHz
- Branding: The Cornerstone

Programming
- Format: Christian contemporary music Christian talk and teaching

Ownership
- Owner: Cornerstone Broadcasting Corporation
- Sister stations: WJLH, WMFJ

History
- First air date: October 7, 1989

Technical information
- Licensing authority: FCC
- Facility ID: 13936
- Class: C3
- ERP: 10,000 Watts
- HAAT: 100 meters (330 ft)
- Translator: See § Translators

Links
- Public license information: Public file; LMS
- Webcast: WJLU Streming Radio
- Website: www.wjlu.org

WJLU is a Christian radio station broadcasting on 89.7 FM, licensed to New Smyrna Beach, Florida, and serving Daytona Beach, Florida, New Smyrna Beach, Florida, and Deltona, Florida. The station's format consists of Christian contemporary music and Christian talk and teaching. WJLU's programming is also heard on sister station WJLH 90.3 in Flagler Beach, Florida, and is heard locally on translators in Daytona Beach, Florida, DeLand, Florida, and Deltona, Florida. The station began broadcasting on October 7, 1989, and had an ERP of 1,000 watts at 200 feet.

== History ==
The station began broadcasting October 7, 1989, and had an ERP of 1,000 watts at 200 feet. In 1991, the station's ERP was increased to 5,000 watts at a height of 300 feet, and in 1994 its ERP was increased to 10,000 watts. WJLH 90.3 in Flagler Beach, Florida began broadcasting August 23, 1996. On September 18, 1998, the station's translator at 97.3 in DeLand was launched and on February 23, 1999, its translator at 97.3 in Daytona Beach began broadcasting. In August 2005, the station's translator at 102.7 in Deltona began broadcasting. In 2010, WJLH's power was increased from 2,000 watts to 15,000 watts.

Call sign	Frequency	City of license	Facility ID	ERP W	Height m (ft)	Class	FCC info
WJLH	90.3 FM	Flagler Beach, Florida	11026	15,000	52 m (171 ft)	C3	FCC (WJLH)

== Translators ==
Call sign	Frequency	City of license	FID	ERP (W)	HAAT	Class	FCC info	Notes
W247AK	97.3 FM	DeLand, Florida	85649	100	33 m (108 ft)	D	LMS	Relays WJLU
W247AL	97.3 FM	Daytona Beach, Florida	85650	120	41 m (135 ft)	D	LMS	Relays WJLU
W267BX	101.3 FM	St. Augustine, Florida	142382	80	47 m (154 ft)	D	LMS	Relays WJLH
W274AY	102.7 FM	Deltona, Florida	142357	250	20 m (66 ft)	D	LMS	Relays WJLU
