= WVYB =

- Holly Hill, Florida; United States
- Broadcast area: Daytona Beach, Florida
- Frequency: 103.3 MHz (HD Radio)
- Branding: 103-3 The Vibe

Programming
- Format: Top 40 (CHR)
- Subchannels: HD2: Dance music "93.5 Planet Vibe"
- Affiliations: Compass Media Networks

Ownership
- Owner: Southern Stone Communication, LLC
- Sister stations: WHOG-FM, WKRO-FM, WLOV-FM, WNDB

History
- First air date: 1996
- Former call signs: WAHJ (1994–1997); WDXD (1997–1999)

Technical information
- Licensing authority: FCC
- Facility ID: 41669
- Class: A
- ERP: 6,000 watts
- HAAT: 89.9 meters (295 ft)
- Transmitter coordinates: 29°14′11.00″N 81°4′22.00″W
- Translator: HD2: 93.5 W228CT (Daytona Beach)

Links
- Public license information: Public file; LMS
- Webcast: Listen Live; Listen Live (HD2)
- Website: 1033wvyb.com planetviberadio.com (HD2)

WVYB (103.3 FM) is a radio station broadcasting a Top 40 (CHR) format. Licensed to Holly Hill, Florida, United States, the station serves the Daytona Beach area. The station is currently owned by Southern Stone Communications, LLC. WVYB broadcasts using HD Radio technology. The digital subchannel of WVYB-HD2 plays Dance music, and is known as "93.5 Planet Vibe". It feeds FM translator W228CT at 93.5 MHz.

== History ==
The station was assigned the call letters WAHJ on March 11, 1994. On April 25, 1997, the station changed its call sign to WDXD and started a country music format as Dixie 103. The station's call sign was changed again on November 3, 1999, to the current WVYB.
