= Sittee River =

Coordinates: 16.808074°N 88.252072°W

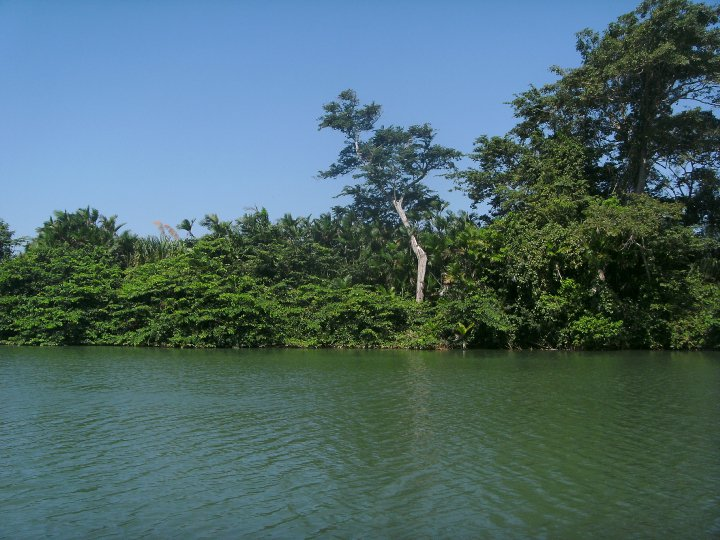
Image of Sittee River, middle of river, March 2010

Sittee River is a river in Belize. It is also the name of a village along the river.

== River ==
Located in central Belize, the mangroves located at the mouth of this river are the tallest ever reported for the Caribbean region and among the tallest anywhere in the entire Neotropical realm. The mouth of the Sittee River represents the optimal conditions for mangrove development and the forest found there has a high level of structural development. Freshwater flows and sediments carried by the river itself, draining from the Maya Mountains, and tidal flushing from the Caribbean Sea all support this tree growth. The forest at the mouth of the river is composed of three mangrove species: red mangrove (Rhizophora mangle), white mangrove (Laguncularia racemosa), and black mangrove (Avicennia germinans).

== Village ==
Sittee River Village has a population of 439 as of 2010. In 2001, the arrival of Hurricane Iris caused significant flooding in the community.

Located in Sittee River Village, Serpon Sugar Mill is the ruins of a 19th-century sugar refinery which has been designated a park. There is a small general store with camping and a community phone on the main village road.
