= Serpon Sugar Mill =

Historic site in Belize

Coordinates: 16.82592°N 88.34425°W

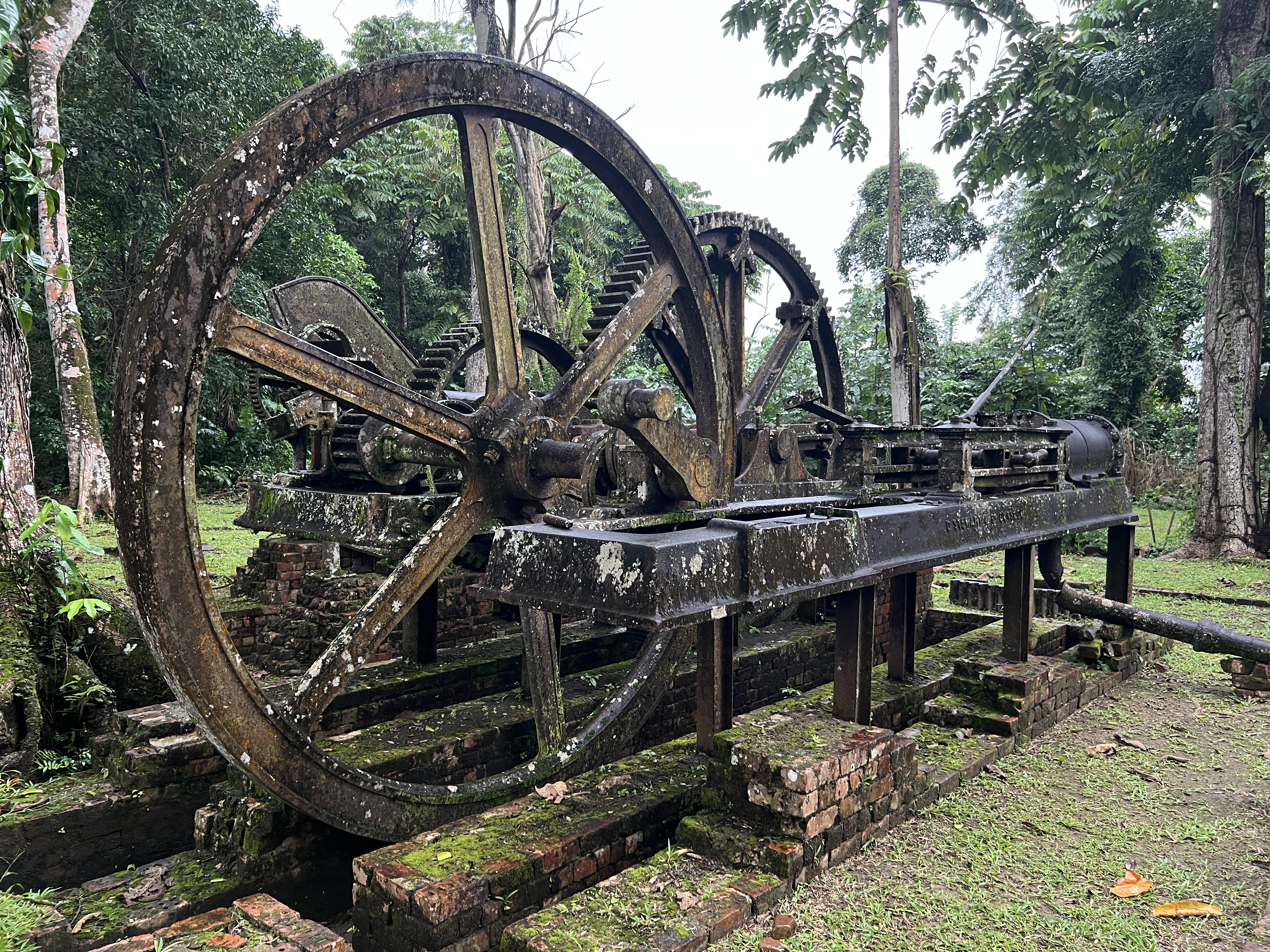
A preserved three-wheel sugarcane crusher at Serpon Sugar Mill

Serpon Sugar Mill is an historical site in Belize, consisting of the remnants of a steam-powered sugar mill whose construction in 1865 marked the beginning of the country's industrial era. It is located near the village of Sittee River in the Stann Creek district.

The cultivation of sugar cane was introduced to Belize, before becoming a British colony, in 1848 by the Maya and Mestizo refugees fleeing from the Caste War in the Yucatán Peninsula. After the American Civil War in 1865, American immigrants from the southern United States invested heavily in sugar plantations and small sugar mills throughout southern Belize.

Serpon Estate was bought by a Scottish man named William Bowman. In 1863, Bowman and the owners of another estate, Regalia, began construction on two steam-powered mills, marking the arrival of the Industrial Revolution in Belize. Parts of the sugar mill at Serpon were manufactured by Stewart and Company in Glasgow, and it's crusher, boiler, beam engine and furnace were all powered by steam. During its peak, it is estimated that the Serpon sugar mill was producing and shipping over 770 kilograms of sugar a month. This and the output from the Regalia mill is said to have fuelled Belize's economy for about 30 years.

By the start of the 20th century, however, sugar production was found to be more profitable in the Corozal and Orange Walk districts, which led to the abandonment of the Serpon and Regalia mills in 1910.

In 2009, the ruins of the Serpon Sugar Mill were designated an archaeological reserve.
