= WMFJ =

- Daytona Beach, Florida; United States
- Frequency: 1450 kHz

Programming
- Format: Christian talk and teaching

Ownership
- Owner: Cornerstone Broadcasting Corporation
- Sister stations: WJLU; WJLH

History
- First air date: March 28, 1935

Technical information
- Licensing authority: FCC
- Facility ID: 57081
- Class: C
- Power: 1,000 watts
- Transmitter coordinates: 29°13′38.8″N 81°1′28.8″W

Links
- Public license information: Public file; LMS
- Webcast: Listen live
- Website: wjlu.org

WMFJ is a radio station broadcasting on 1450 kHz, which is licensed to Daytona Beach, Florida, United States. The station is owned by Cornerstone Broadcasting Corporation, and airs a Christian talk and teaching format.

== History ==
WMFJ began test broadcasts on March 21, 1935, and began regular programing on March 28, originally broadcasting at 1420 kHz. The station moved to 1450 kHz in March 1941, as a result of the North American Regional Broadcasting Agreement. WMFJ aired a contemporary hits format in the 1960s and 1970s. The station adopted a religious format in the early 1980s. In February 1996, WMFJ was purchased by Cornerstone Broadcasting.
