= WNDB =

News/talk radio station in Daytona Beach, Florida, United States

- Daytona Beach, Florida; United States
- Frequency: 1150 kHz
- Branding: News Radio WNDB

Programming
- Format: Talk radio
- Affiliations: Compass Media Networks; Fox News Radio; Premiere Networks; Salem Radio Network; Motor Racing Network

Ownership
- Owner: Southern Stone Communications LLC.
- Sister stations: WHOG-FM; WKRO-FM; WLOV-FM; WVYB

History
- First air date: April 15, 1948
- Call sign meaning: "News Daytona Beach"

Technical information
- Licensing authority: FCC
- Facility ID: 10342
- Class: B
- Power: 1,000 watts
- Transmitter coordinates: 29°14′06″N 81°04′19″W
- Translator: 98.5 W253DI (Daytona Beach)
- Repeater: (95.7-3) WHOG-HD3 (Ormond-By-The-Sea)

Links
- Public license information: Public file; LMS
- Webcast: Listen live
- Website: www.newsdaytonabeach.com

WNDB (1150 kHz) is a commercial radio station broadcasting a talk radio format. Licensed to Daytona Beach, Florida, the station is owned by Southern Stone Communications. It signed on the air in April 1948.

WNDB is powered at 1,000 watts. By day, it is non-directional; at night, to protect other stations on 1150 AM, it uses a directional antenna with a two-tower array. Programming is also heard on 250-watt FM translator 98.5 W253DI in Daytona Beach.

Logo while on 93.5 translator

== Programming ==
WNDB carries nationally syndicated conservative talk programs including The Sean Hannity Show, Brian Kilmede and Friends, The Clay Travis and Buck Sexton Show, The Joe Pags Show, America in the Morning, This Morning, America's First News with Gordon Deal and Coast to Coast AM with George Noory.

WNDB is the "host station" of the annual Daytona 500, and is the flagship station for the Motor Racing Network.
