= Jeff Brower =

American politician (born 1955)

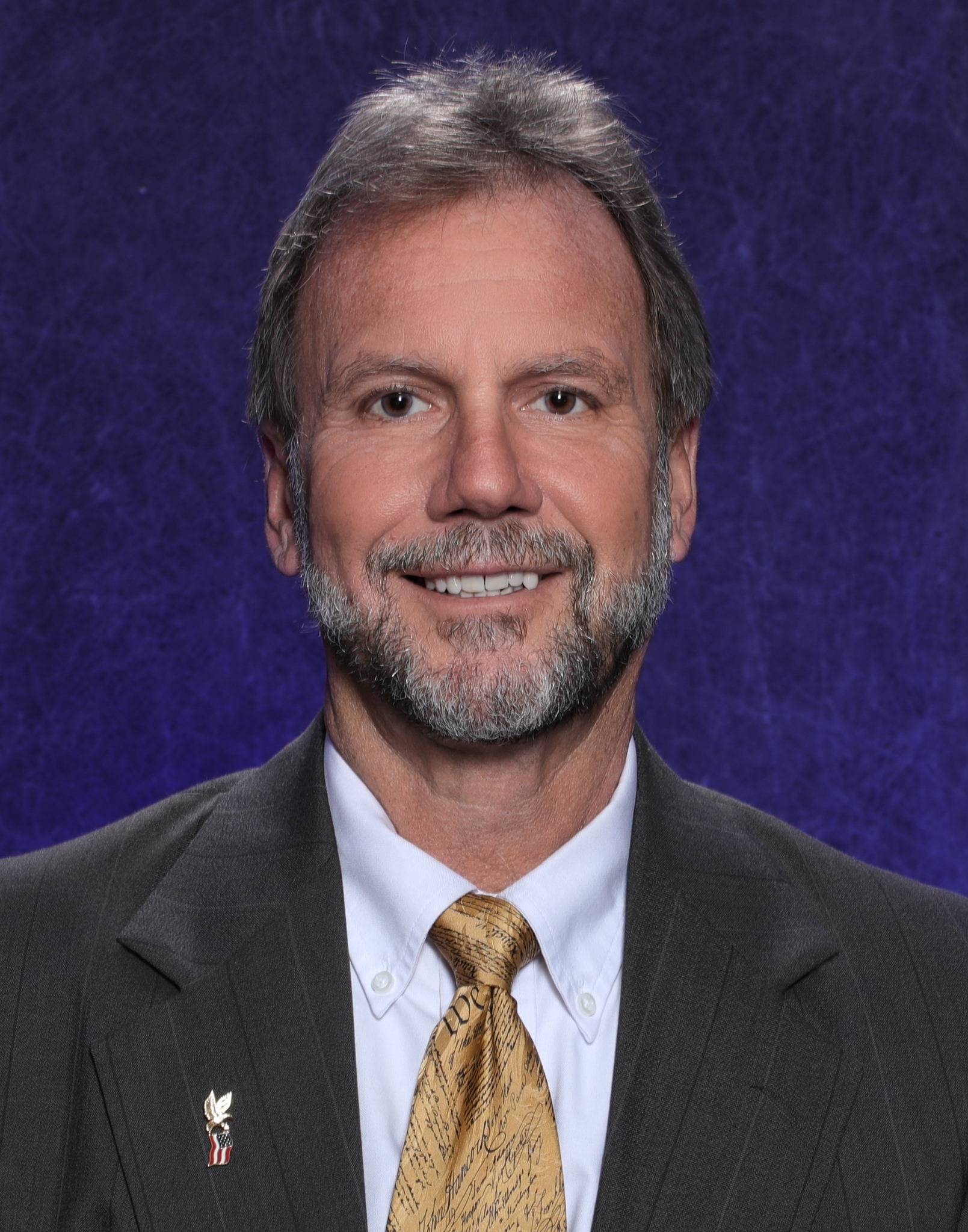
- Official portrait, c. 2021

4th Volusia County Chair
- Incumbent
- Assumed office January 7, 2021
- Preceded by: Ed Kelley

Personal details
- Born: Jeffrey Scott Brower; November 16, 1955 (age 69) Pennsylvania, U.S.
- Political party: Republican
- Spouse: Terri Brower (m. 1985)
- Children: 9
- Education: University of Florida (BS)
- Occupation: Politician; farmer; lifeguard

Jeffrey Scott Brower (born November 16, 1955) is an American politician and farmer serving as the fourth Volusia County chair since 2021. A member of the Republican Party, he was appointed leader of the SunRail board in April 2024 and has served on the Central Florida Commuter Rail Commission since 2021.

== Early life and career ==
Jeffrey Scott Brower was born on November 16, 1955, in Pennsylvania. His family moved to Daytona Beach, Florida, when he was 3 years old. He received a Bachelor of Science in agricultural science from the University of Florida.

Brower worked for the Daytona Beach Patrol as a lifeguard from 1970 to 1979. After college, he first worked for a plant nursery, then a marketing agency, and finally worked for six years as a recruiter for a pest control and fertilization business. He left the company to become a full-time farmer in 2000. He established a small landscaping company in 2004. He volunteered as an associate supervisor for the Volusia Soil & Water Conservation District.

In 2018, Brower was defeated in the Volusia County Council 1st district primary election.

== Volusia County chair (2021–present) ==
In 2020, Brower was elected county-wide as Volusia County chair with 56% of the vote, defeating Volusia County councilwoman Deb Denys. His campaign was based upon cutting taxes and waterway preservation.

In March 2022, Brower endorsed state representative Anthony Sabatini in the 2022 Florida's 7th congressional district Republican primary. Sabatini lost the primary to Army combat veteran Cory Mills, who went on to win the general election. Brower and county sheriff Mike Chitwood attended a demonstration in support of Israel following the Hamas attack of October 2023.

In 2023, Brower and county councilman Don Dempsey voted against increasing the distance sex offenders could live from schools, with Dempsey stating that the two councillors had opposed the bill because the increased distance could make it harder to track offenders. Brower has also voted for stronger environmental regulations to stop climate change and local flooding.

In early 2024, Brower and county council vice chair Troy Kent voted in opposition to the construction of a fuel terminal in Ormond Beach. The remaining county council members approved the project, and the moratorium vote ultimately failed by a 5-2 margin.

Brower ran for re-election in the 2024 Volusia County chair election. He was challenged by Port Orange mayor Don Burnette; auto dealer Randy Dye, the father of stock car racer Daniel Dye; and former county councilwoman Deb Denys. Denys and Burnette were eliminated in the August primary, and Brower went on to narrowly win re-election with 51.4% of the vote in the November runoff against Dye. During the race, Brower campaigned heavily on "stopping overdevelopment", a stance which Sheldon Gardner of the Daytona Beach News-Journal labelled as "anti-growth". The Volusia County Republican Party voted to endorse Dye in the election. The election resulted in a "feud" between Brower and Chitwood, with each endorsing the other's opponent in their respective races.

== Personal life ==
Brower is Protestant. He moved to DeLeon Springs in 1982. He married his wife Terri in 1985. They have 9 children, four boys and five girls.
