= WSBB (AM) =

- New Smyrna Beach, Florida; United States
- Broadcast area: Daytona Beach metropolitan area
- Frequency: 1230 kHz
- Branding: AM 1230 and AM 1490

Programming
- Format: Adult standards
- Affiliations: Florida Gators football

Ownership
- Owner: Diegel Communications, LLC

History
- First air date: February 1, 1952; 74 years ago

Technical information
- Licensing authority: FCC
- Facility ID: 64368
- Class: C
- Power: 1,000 watts
- Transmitter coordinates: 29°2′3.00″N 80°55′2.00″W
- Translator: 106.9 W295CN (Ormond Beach)
- Repeater: 1490 WTJV (DeLand)

Links
- Public license information: Public file; LMS
- Webcast: Listen live
- Website: myam1230.com

WSBB (1230 kHz) is a commercial AM radio station broadcasting an adult standards format. Licensed to New Smyrna Beach, Florida, United States, the station serves the Daytona Beach metropolitan area. The station is owned by Diegel Communications and its studios are located at 229 Canal Street, just a few blocks away from WSBB's historic studios on the west end of the causeway. The causeway location, off Indian River North, continues to serve as the main transmission site for WSBB.

The stations play adult standards music from over five decades, and the playlist is locally programmed at the station. At the beginning of most hours, WSBB carries Radio Network News. It also broadcasts University of Florida sports, including Florida Gators football games, and the nationally syndicated Dave Ramsey Show.

In addition to being heard on AM 1230, programming is also heard on an FM translator station, 106.9 W295CN in Ormond Beach. WSBB is also simulcast on co-owned WTJV (1490 AM) in DeLand. Both AM stations transmit with 1,000 watts using non-directional antennas. The translator’s effective radiated power is 250 watts.

== History ==
The Federal Communications Commission (FCC) granted a construction permit for a new AM station in New Smyrna Beach in 1950. WSBB signed on the air on February 1, 1952. WSBB stood for “World’s Safest Bathing Beach” as a published advertising gimmick for the area at the time. It was only powered at 100 watts and was owned by the Beach Broadcasting Company. By the 1970s, its power had increased to 1,000 watts by day, 250 watts at night. In the 1980s, the station began broadcasting at 1,000 watts around the clock.

In 2006, the station was bought by Gore-Overgaard Broadcasting, Inc., for $450,000. In the spring of 2008, WSBB was sold to Skip Diegel, president of Diegel Communications, LLC.
