= Volusia County Chair =

Chief executive of Volusia County, Florida

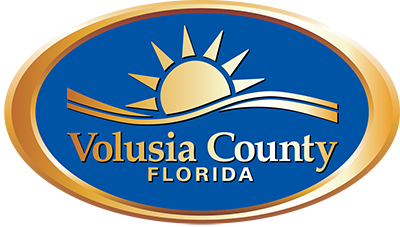
- Seal of the Volusia County chair

- Flag of Volusia County, Florida

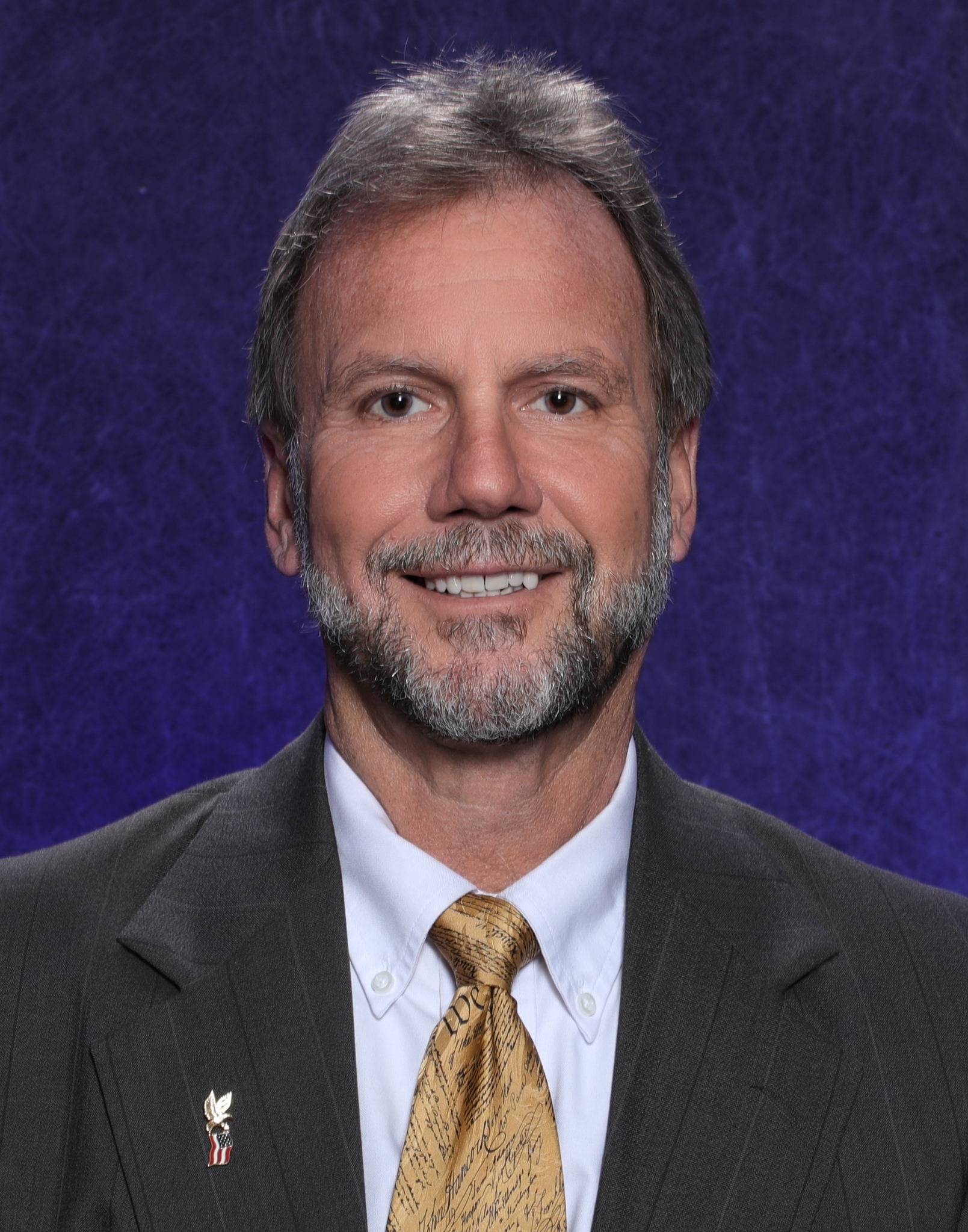
- Incumbent; Jeff Brower since January 7, 2021
- Style: The Honorable (formal); Mr. Chairman (informal)
- Type: County executive
- Status: Presiding officer
- Member of: County Council; Central Florida Commuter Rail Commission
- Reports to: Volusia County Council
- Seat: DeLand, Florida
- Nominator: Direct election (Note: The Volusia County chair is officially elected in a non-partisan election, despite common de facto party affiliation.)
- Appointer: Governor of Florida (Note: The Governor of Florida may appoint a successor to fill a vacancy until the next regularly scheduled election.)
- Term length: 4 years, renewable once consecutively
- Constituting instrument: 2004 Volusia County Charter Amendment
- Precursor: Volusia County Chairman
- Formation: January 2005
- First holder: Frank T. Bruno Jr.
- Unofficial names: Chair of Volusia County
- Deputy: Vice Chair
- Salary: US$82,067.33
- Website: Official website

The Volusia County chair, officially called chair of the Volusia County Council and sometimes called Volusia County Council chair, is the county executive and chairman of the county council of Volusia County, Florida. The county chair is independently elected countywide, every four years, in a non-partisan election.

In total, four men have served as Volusia County chair since the creation of the post in 2005. Since 2009, Frank T. Bruno Jr. was the only two-term county chair, a distinction held until Jeff Brower's victory in the 2024 county chair election. The current officeholder is Jeffrey S. Brower, a member of the Republican Party who took office on January 7, 2021.

== History ==
In 1970, the Volusia County Council was reformed into an elected body of seven members representing districts within the county, effective January 1, 1971. The Volusia County chair was elected annually by the county council until the 2004 Amendment to the Volusia County Charter. Since the 2004 Volusia County chair election, the county chair has been elected countywide, every four years, in a non-partisan election, held in presidential election years. The county chair's post is the most powerful elected office in Volusia County and one of the most powerful in Central Florida. The Volusia County chair is one of three independently elected county executives in Florida, along with the mayor of Orange County and mayor of Miami-Dade County.

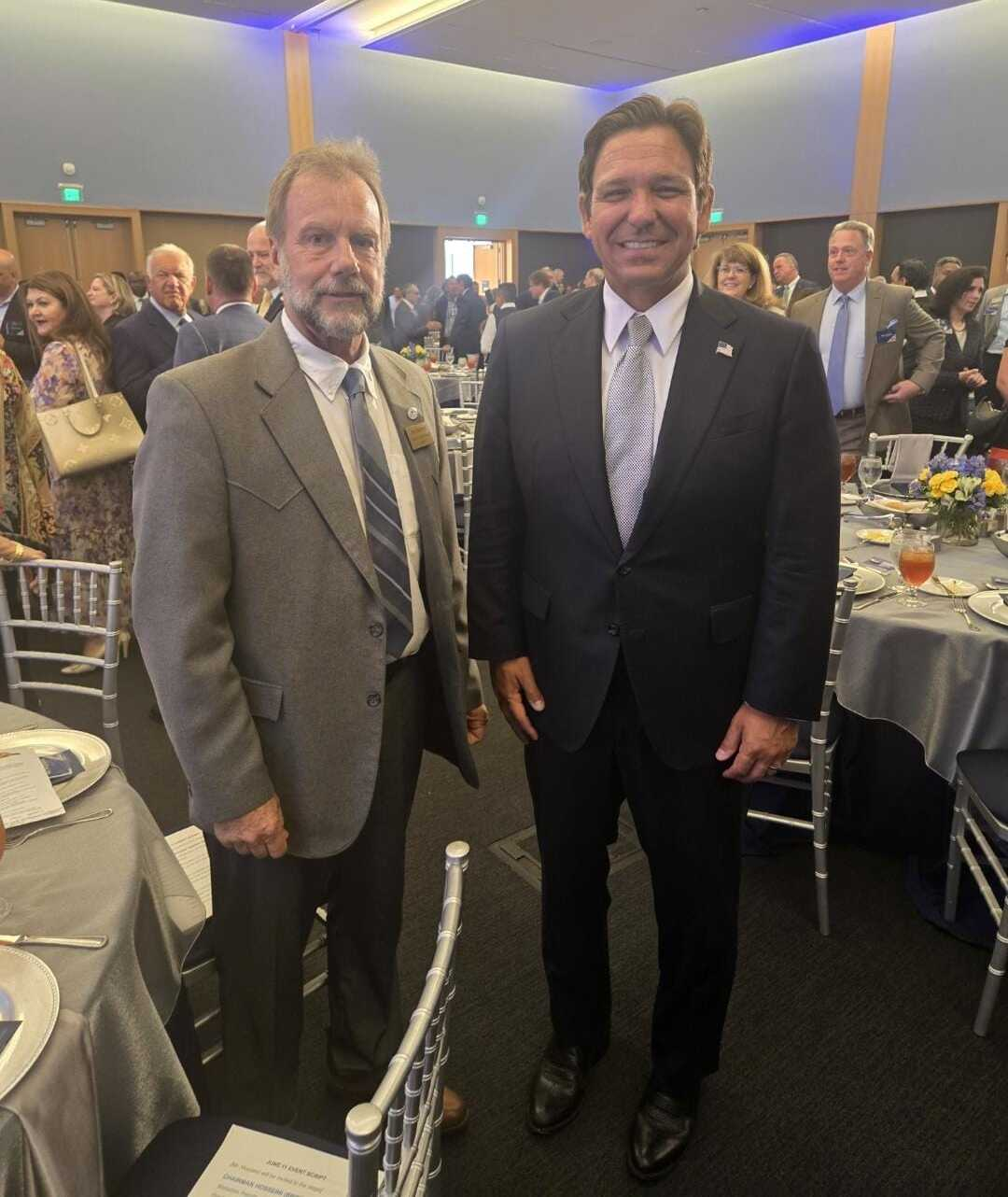
Volusia County Chair Jeff Brower with Governor Ron DeSantis, 2024

An elected member of the Volusia County Council, the county vice chair is the official deputy to the county chair and is elected annually by the county council. The current Volusia County vice chair is Matt Reinhart, a member of the Republican Party who took office in January 2025.

== Duties and responsibilities ==
The Volusia County chair oversees approximately 3,000 county employees and manages a budget of over $1.3 billion, as of 2024. The county chair and county council have municipal-equivalent authority over unincorporated areas and census-designated places within Volusia County. The position is officially a part-time role.

The Volusia County chair serves as a statutory member of the Central Florida Commuter Rail Commission.

=== Executive and legislative powers ===
Among the constitutional powers of the county chair:

- Official and ceremonial representative of the county government
- Issue proclamations on behalf of the county government
- Preside as chair in county council meetings and has an equal vote on all questions coming before the council
- Execute ordinances, resolutions, and other authorized documents of the county government

=== Political role ===
The Volusia County chair usually informally serves as the county leader of whatever political party to which they belong. They often have the ability to influence the selection of other party leaders, offer endorsements to candidates, and serve as a spokesman for their organization. As a prominent elected official, the county chairman enjoys media attention and high levels of public recognition and wields agenda-setting authority and the ability to influence public opinion within the county.

== List of Volusia County chairs ==
List of council-elected county chairs:

- Robert L. Strickland (1971–1972)
- Harris M. Saxon (1972–1973)
- Joseph Benedict III (1973–1974)
- William H. Scovell (1974–1975)
- James E. Huger (1975–1977)
- Joseph Benedict III (1977–1978)
- James E. Huger (1978–1979)
- John W. Summers (1979–1980)
- P.T. Fleuchaus (1980–1981)
- Clyde R. Mann (1981–1982)
- Robert N. Hartman (1982–1983)
- Jack Ascherl (1983–1984)
- P.T. Fleuchaus (1984–1985)
- Jack Ascherl (1985–1986)
- Jerome N. Doliner (1986–1987)
- Frank T. Bruno Jr. (1987–1988)
- Roy Schleicher (1988–1989)
- Clay Henderson (1989–1990)
- Alice Cycler (1990–1991)
- Big John (1991–1992)
- Deanie Lowe (1992–1993)
- Robert E. Tuttle (1993–1994)
- Phil Giorno (1994–1995)
- Freddye Moore (1995–1996)
- Patricia A. Northey (1996–1997)
- Pat Patterson (1997–1998)
- R. Stanley Rosevear (1998–1999)
- Patricia A. Northey (1999–2000)
- James E. Ward (2000–2001)
- Dwight D. Lewis (2001–2002)
- Ann McFall (2002–2003)
- Frank T. Bruno Jr. (2003–2004)
- Dwight D. Lewis (2004–2005)

=== Independently elected Volusia County chairs ===
No.	Image	Chair	Term start	Term end	Party
1		Frank T. Bruno Jr.	January 2005	January 2013	Democratic
2		Jason P. Davis	January 2013	January 2017	Republican
3		Ed Kelley	January 2017	January 7, 2021	Republican
4		Jeff Brower	January 7, 2021	Incumbent	Republican

== See also ==
- Government of Florida
- Elections in Florida
- Politics of Florida
