= Florida East Coast Railway =

Class II railroad operating in Florida

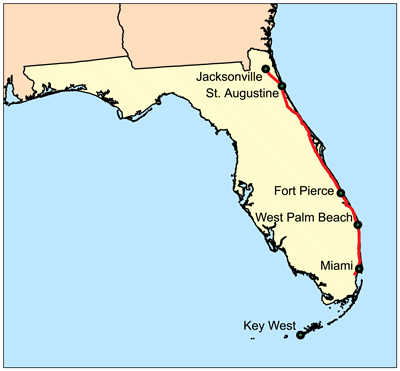
- Route map

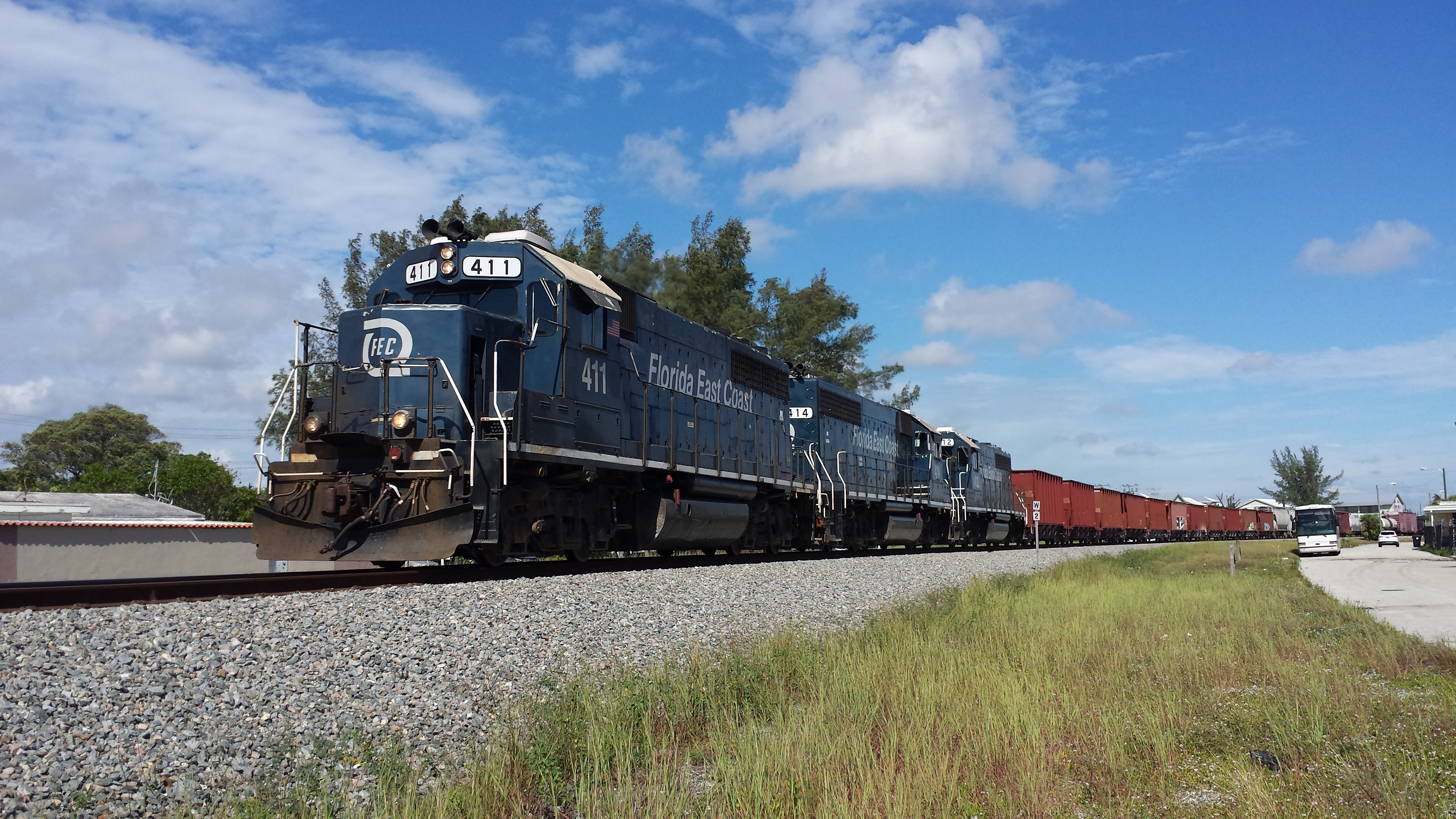
- Three GP40-2s lead a southbound train through Lake Worth, Florida

Overview
- Parent company: Grupo México
- Headquarters: Jacksonville, Florida, U.S.
- Reporting mark: FEC
- Locale: Florida
- Dates of operation: 1885–present

Technical
- Track gauge: 4 ft 8 1/2 in (1,435 mm) standard gauge
- Length: 351 mi (565 km)

Other
- Website: www.fecrwy.com

The Florida East Coast Railway (reporting mark FEC) is a Class II railroad operating in the U.S. state of Florida, currently owned by Grupo México.

Built primarily in the last quarter of the 19th century and the first decade of the 20th century, the FEC was a project of Standard Oil principal Henry Flagler. He originally visited Florida with his first wife, Mary; they sought assistance with the health issues she faced. A key strategist who worked closely with John D. Rockefeller building the Standard Oil Trust, Flagler noted both great potential and a lack of services during his stay at St. Augustine. He subsequently began what amounted to his second career, developing resorts, industries, and communities all along Florida's shores abutting the Atlantic Ocean.

The FEC is possibly best known for building the railroad to Key West, completed in 1912. When the FEC's line from the mainland to Key West was heavily damaged by the Labor Day Hurricane of 1935, the State of Florida purchased the remaining right-of-way and bridges south of Dade County, and they were rebuilt into road bridges for vehicle traffic and became known as the Overseas Highway. However, a greater and lasting Flagler legacy was the developments along Florida's eastern coast.

During the Great Depression, control was purchased by heirs of the du Pont family. After 30 years of fragile financial condition, the FEC, under leadership of a new president, Ed Ball, took on the labor unions. Ball claimed the company could not afford the same costs as larger Class 1 railroads and needed to invest saved funds in its infrastructure, the condition of which was fast becoming a safety issue. The company—using replacement workers—and some of its employees engaged from 1963 until 1977 in one of the longest and more violent labor conflicts of the 20th century. Ultimately, federal authorities had to intervene to stop the violence, which included bombings, shootings and vandalism. However, the courts ruled in the FEC's favor with regard to the right to employ strikebreakers. During this time Ball invested heavily in numerous steps to improve the railroad's physical plant, and installed various forms of automation. The FEC was the first US railroad to operate two-man train crews, eliminate cabooses, and end all of its passenger services (which were unprofitable) by 1968.

Today, the company's primary rail revenues come from its intermodal and rock trains. Brightline, an inter-city rail route, uses FEC tracks between Cocoa and Miami.

The FEC was historically a Class I railroad owned by Florida East Coast Industries (FECI) from 2000 to 2016, FOXX Holdings between 1983 and 2000, and the St. Joe Company prior to 1983.

== History ==
=== Henry Flagler: developing Florida's east coast ===
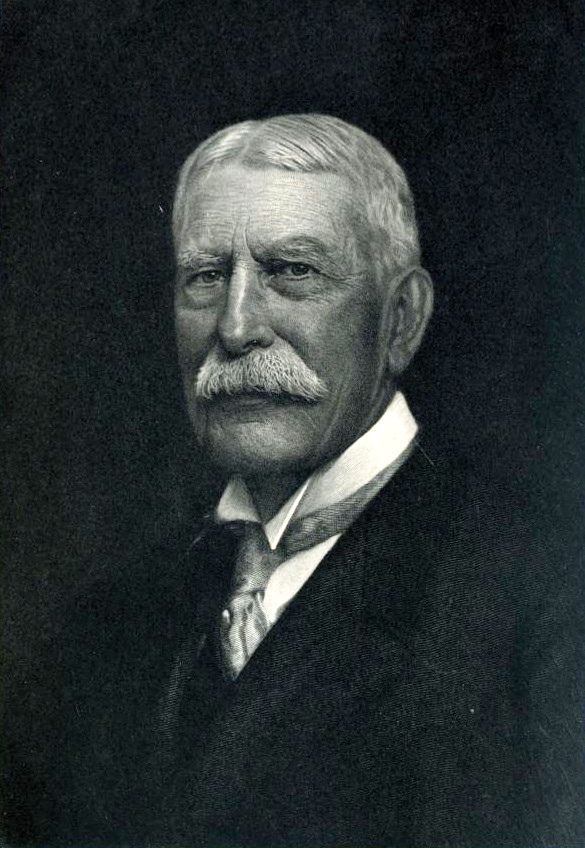
Henry M. Flagler

The Florida East Coast Railway (FEC) was developed by Henry Morrison Flagler, an American tycoon, real estate promoter, railroad developer and John D. Rockefeller's partner in Standard Oil. Formed at Cleveland, Ohio, as Rockefeller, Andrews & Flagler in 1867, Standard Oil moved its headquarters in 1877 to New York City. Flagler and his family relocated there as well. He was joined by Henry H. Rogers, another leader of Standard Oil who also became involved in the development of America's railroads, including those on nearby Staten Island, the Union Pacific, and later in West Virginia, where he eventually built the remarkable Virginian Railway to transport coal to Hampton Roads, Virginia.

Flagler's non-Standard Oil interests went in a different direction, however, when in 1878, on the advice of his physician, he traveled to Jacksonville, Florida, for the winter with his first wife, Mary, who was quite ill. Two years after she died in 1881, he married Mary's former caregiver, Ida Alice Shourds. After their wedding, the couple traveled to St. Augustine, Florida, in 1883. Flagler found the city charming, but the hotel facilities and transportation systems inadequate. He recognized Florida's potential to attract out-of-state visitors. Though Flagler remained on the Board of Directors of Standard Oil, he gave up his day-to-day involvement in the firm in order to pursue his Florida interests.

When Flagler returned to Florida, in 1885 he began building a grand St. Augustine hotel, the Ponce de Leon Hotel. Flagler realized that the key to developing Florida was a solid transportation system. At the time, St. Augustine was served by the Jacksonville, St. Augustine and Halifax River Railway (JStA&HR), a 3 ft (914 mm) narrow gauge railway that began service in 1883 between South Jacksonville and St. Augustine. While the JStA&HR was used to transport building materials for the hotel's construction, Flagler found it was poorly constructed and its passenger services would be inadequate for patrons to reach his hotel. Flagler joined the board of the JStA&HR on December 10, 1885, before fully purchasing the line three weeks later. Flagler then rehabilitated the line to his standards, purchased new rolling stock, and converting the track to standard gauge. He built a modern depot facility as well as schools, hospitals and churches, systematically revitalizing the largely abandoned historic city.

The Ponce de Leon Hotel opened on January 10, 1888. By April of that year, Flagler acquired a second hotel in St. Augustine, the Casa Monica Hotel, which he renamed Cordova. He then built a third hotel, the Hotel Alcazar, which opened in 1898. With the success of his three St. Augustine hotels, Flagler incorporated the Jacksonville Bridge Company to build a bridge across the St. Johns River and connect the JStA&HR to the rest of Jacksonville's railroads. Passengers needed to be ferried across the St. Johns River in Jacksonville to access the line at the time, which was a time-consuming process. Construction began in 1889 and the bridge opened on January 5, 1890, allowing a direct connection for private railcars and Pullman coaches to reach St. Augustine.

By 1888, Flagler was interested in expanding his network beyond St. Augustine. He acquired three additional railroads that year to expand further south. He acquired the St. Johns Railway, which ran from St. Augustine west to the St. Johns River at Tocoi Landing. The St. Johns Railway first opened in 1858 and Flagler purchased the line from New York millionaire William Astor. Flagler also acquired another railroad from Astor, the St. Augustine and Palatka Railway which ran from Tocoi Junction (about halfway between St. Augustine and Tocoi Landing) on the St. Johns Railway and ran southwest to East Palatka. Finally, Flagler acquired the St. Johns and Halifax River Railroad which opened in the early 1880s from East Palatka southeast to Ormond Beach and Daytona. It was extended west into Palatka after the completion of a bridge over the St. Johns River in 1888. In addition to expanding the network, the acquired railroads gave Flagler two additional accesses to the St. Johns River at Tocoi Landing and East Palatka, as well as additional connections to other railroads in Palatka. Continuing to develop hotel facilities to entice northern tourists to visit Florida, Flagler bought and expanded the Ormond Hotel in Ormond Beach.

Flagler created the Jacksonville, St. Augustine and Indian River Railway Company in 1892 as a holding company for his railroad network.

=== Expanding further south ===
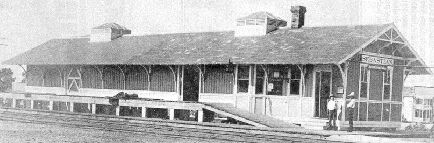
The Florida East Coast Railway depot in Sebastian. The structure was built in 1893.

Beginning in 1892, when landowners south of Daytona petitioned him to extend the railroad 80 miles (130 km) south, Flagler began laying new railroad tracks; no longer did he follow his traditional practice of purchasing existing railroads and merging them into his growing rail system. Under Florida's generous land-grant laws passed in 1893, 8,000 acres (3,237 ha) could be claimed from the state for every mile (1.6 km) built. Flagler would eventually claim in excess of two million acres (809,371 ha; 8,094 km^{2}) for building his railroad, and land development and trading would become one of his most profitable endeavors. Flagler obtained a charter from the state of Florida authorizing him to build a railroad along the Indian River to Miami, and as the railroad progressed southward, cities such as New Smyrna and Titusville began to develop along the tracks.

The railroad reached Fort Pierce January 29, 1894. By March 22 of the same year, the railroad system reached what is today known as West Palm Beach. Flagler constructed the Royal Poinciana Hotel in Palm Beach overlooking the Lake Worth Lagoon. He also built the Breakers Hotel on the ocean side of Palm Beach, and Whitehall, his private 55-room, 60,000 square foot (5,600 m^{2}) winter home. The development of these three structures, coupled with railroad access to them, established Palm Beach as a winter resort for the wealthy members of America's Gilded Age.

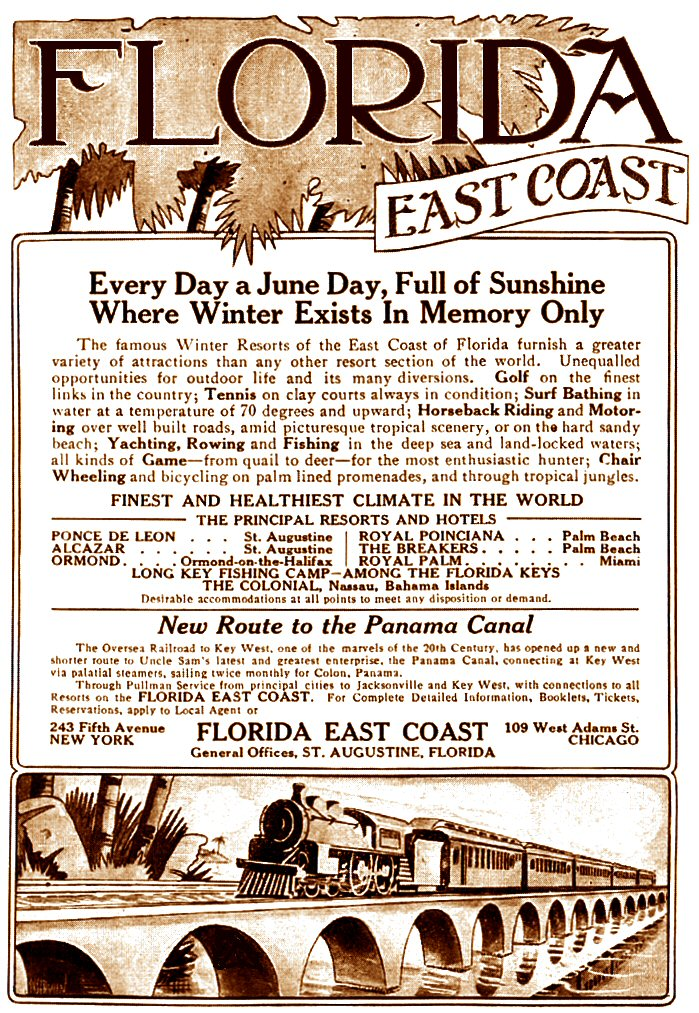
A 1913 print advertisement extols the many advantages of traveling on the Florida East Coast Railway, the "New Route to the Panama Canal".

Palm Beach was to be the terminus of the Flagler railroad, but during 1894 and 1895, severe freezes hit all of Central Florida, whereas the Miami area remained unaffected, causing Flagler to rethink his original decision not to move the railroad south of Palm Beach. The fable that Julia Tuttle, one of two main landowners in the Miami area along with the Brickell family, sent orange blossoms to Flagler to prove to him that Miami, unlike the rest of the state, was unaffected by the frost, is untrue. The truth is that she wired him to advise him that "the region around the shores of Biscayne Bay is untouched by the freezes." He sent his two lieutenants, James E. Ingraham and Joseph R. Parrott—now famous in Florida history—to investigate; they brought boxes of truck (produce) and citrus back to Flagler, who then wired Tuttle, asking, "Madam, what is it that you propose?" To convince Flagler to continue the railroad to Miami, both Tuttle and William Brickell offered half of their holdings north and south of the Miami River to him. Tuttle added 50 acres (200,000 m^{2}) for shops and yards if Flagler would extend his railroad to the shores of Biscayne Bay and build one of his great hotels. An agreement was made and contracts were signed. On September 7, 1895, the name of Flagler's system was officially changed from the Jacksonville, St. Augustine and Indian River Railway Company to the Florida East Coast Railway Company and incorporated. The Florida East Coast Railway reached Fort Lauderdale on March 3, 1896. On April 15, 1896, track reached Biscayne Bay, the site of present-day downtown Miami. At the time, it was a small settlement of less than 50 inhabitants. When the town incorporated, on July 28, 1896, its citizens wanted to honor the man responsible for the city's development by naming it Flagler. He declined the honor, persuading them to retain its old Indian name, "Miami." The area was actually previously known as Fort Dallas after the fort built there in 1836 during the Second Seminole War. To further develop the area surrounding the Miami railroad station, Flagler dredged a channel, built streets and The Royal Palm Hotel, instituted the first water and power systems, and financed the town's first newspaper, the Metropolis.

In 1903, Flagler extended the main line an additional 12 miles from Downtown Miami southwest to access much of the unsettled lowlands near Cutler Ridge which he felt could generate agricultural traffic. This proved successful and the following year, the line was extended to Homestead.

=== Labor issues ===
Throughout the 1880s and 1890s, the fledgling rail empire extensively employed convict labor from largely African-American convicts. While most Southern states employed a form of convict lease at the time, renting prisoners' labor to various businesses, Florida's version of convict lease was considered "especially violent" compared to the others.

According to historian Joe Knetsch, reformers and muckrakers exaggerated charges of peonage regarding construction of the Florida East Coast Railway in 1893 to 1909. Flager and his lawyers defeated all legal challenges and neither the company or its employees were ever convicted in court. However, there were many reports of harsh working conditions and forced indebtedness to the company, and malfeasance by labor agents who hired men for the railway. Knetsch concludes that "Flagler in fact provided health care for his employees and was a far better employer than the press alleged."

=== Key West extension ===
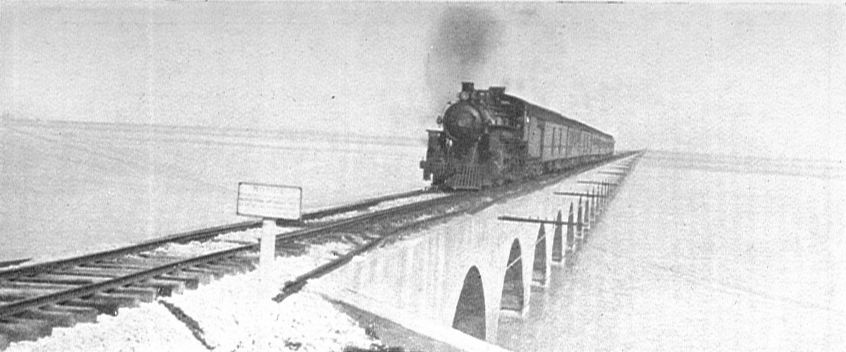
en route to Key West

Once the railroad reached Homestead in 1904, Flagler then sought perhaps his greatest challenge: the extension of the Florida East Coast Railway to Key West, a city of almost 20,000 inhabitants located 128 miles (206 km) beyond the end of the Florida peninsula. He became particularly interested in linking Key West to the mainland after the construction of the Panama Canal was announced by the United States in 1905. As the closest deep-water port in the United States to the canal, Key West was positioned to take advantage of significant new trade with the west that would be enabled by the opening of the canal – this, in addition to the city's existing involvement with Cuban and Latin American trade. Key West was a major coaling station for ship traffic between South America and New York. Flagler thought it would be profitable for coal to be brought by railroad to Key West for coaling those ships. Though, by the time the extension was finished, the range of ships had been extended to such a degree that they no longer stopped in Key West for coal.

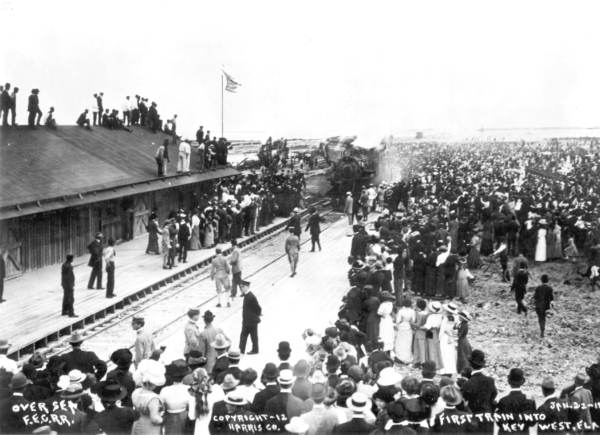
First Florida East Coast Railway train arriving in Key West

The construction of the Overseas Railroad required many engineering innovations as well as vast amounts of labor and monetary resources. Many considered the Key West extension a folly as it was one of the most daring infrastructure ever built exclusively with private funds. At one time during construction, four thousand men were employed. During the seven years of construction, three hurricanes threatened to halt the project. This included the 1906 Florida Keys hurricane, which killed 135 of Flagler's workers.

The Key West extension cost $50 million and the lives of hundreds of workmen. Workers toiled under conditions sufficiently cruel and harsh that the US Justice Department prosecuted the FECR under a federal slave-kidnapping law. Journalists also chronicled conditions of debt peonage wherein immigrant labor was threatened with prohibitive transportation fees to leave Key West after seeing the unsafe and disease-ridden conditions, essentially forcing them to stay.

Despite the hardships, the final link of the Florida East Coast Railway to Trumbo Point in Key West was completed in 1912. The first train, a construction engineers' train, arrived in Key West on January 21, 1912. The next day, which is considered the first day of service on the new route, a proud Henry Flagler rode the first passenger train into Key West, marking the completion of the railroad's oversea connection to Key West and the linkage by railway of the entire east coast of Florida. The completed extension was widely known as the "Eighth Wonder of the World". Upon his arrival in Key West, Flagler stated "Now I can die in peace" with pride in his achievement. Flagler died 16 months later in May 1913.

== FEC through the years ==
=== Effect of the Florida land boom and Great Depression ===
The Florida East Coast Railway benefitted greatly from the Florida land boom of the 1920s, which led to increased traffic. By 1923, the FEC was running five daily passenger trains roundtrip between Jacksonville and Miami. Two of these trains, the Havana Special and the Key West Express continued to Key West. The following year, the number of passenger trains between Jacksonville and Miami increased to eight with two continuing to Key West. In response to the land boom, the FEC made investments to their network to increase capacity. Within the decade, FEC built Bowden Yard in Jacksonville and the Miller Shops in St. Augustine. In 1923, the FEC built the Miami Belt Line, a freight route that ran from Little River through Hialeah that reconnected with the main line in Larkin (near Kendall), bypassing downtown Miami. A yard was also built in Hialeah. In 1925, the Moultrie Cutoff was built to shorten the distance between St. Augustine and Bunnell (just north of Ormond Beach) on the main line by bypassing its turn towards Palatka. The main line was also expanded to double track from Jacksonville to Miami in 1926, along with the installation of automatic block signaling. Many of the bridges were rebuilt when the main line was expanded to double track, including the original bridge over the St. Johns River in Jacksonville which was replaced by the current Strauss Trunnion Bascule Bridge. By the end of 1926, the number of passenger trains from Jacksonville to Miami increased to 12, with some continuing to Key West.

Due to the prosperity of South Florida during the land boom, the Seaboard Air Line Railroad brought competition to the region by building a line from Central Florida to West Palm Beach in 1925. This line was extended to Miami and Homestead on a route nearly parallel to the FEC two years later.

The Stock Market Crash of 1929 and Great Depression were harsh on the FEC. The railroad declared bankruptcy and was in receivership by September 1931, 18 years after Flagler's death. Bus service began to be substituted for trains on the branches in 1932. Streamliners plied the rails between 1939 and 1963, including The East Coast Champion (from New York), The Florida Special (from New York), City of Miami (from Chicago), Dixie Flagler (from Chicago) and South Wind (from Chicago), all of which were jointly operated with the Atlantic Coast Line Railroad.

=== Labor Day Hurricane of 1935 ===
The Key West extension was heavily damaged and partially destroyed in the Labor Day Hurricane of 1935. An FEC rescue train, with the exception of steam locomotive 447, was overturned by the storm surge at Islamorada. 42 miles (68 km) of track were washed away by the hurricane, two miles of which ended up washing ashore on the mainland at Cape Sable. The FEC's Long Key Fishing Camp was also destroyed in the storm. Traffic was immediately embargoed south of Florida City after the storm while the Florida East Coast Railway decided whether or not to restore the line.

The Florida East Coast Railway quickly determined that it was financially unable to rebuild the destroyed sections. The roadbed and remaining bridges south of Florida City were then sold to the state of Florida, which built the Overseas Highway to Key West, using much of the remaining railway infrastructure. A rebuilt Overseas Highway (U.S. Route 1), taking an alignment that closely follows the Overseas Railroad's original routing, continues to provide the only highway link to Key West, ending near the southernmost point in the continental United States. The remaining Long Key Viaduct, Seven Mile Bridge, and Bahia Honda Rail Bridge that once carried the Key West extension still stand and are on the National Register of Historic Places.

=== Change in ownership ===
In the early 1960s, Edward Ball, who controlled the Alfred I. duPont Testamentary Trust, bought a majority ownership of FEC, buying its bonds on the open market, allowing the FEC to emerge from bankruptcy following protracted litigation with a group of the company's other bondholders, led by S.A. Lynch and associated with the Atlantic Coast Line which had proposed an alternate plan of reorganization. That same year, a labor contract negotiation turned sour. Ball was determined to save the railroad from the bankruptcy that had continued for more than a decade. Ball was certain that if the company didn't become profitable, the equipment and track would deteriorate to the point where some lines would become unsafe or unusable and require partial abandonment. Later, in 1962, the expanded Cuban embargo added to the woes.

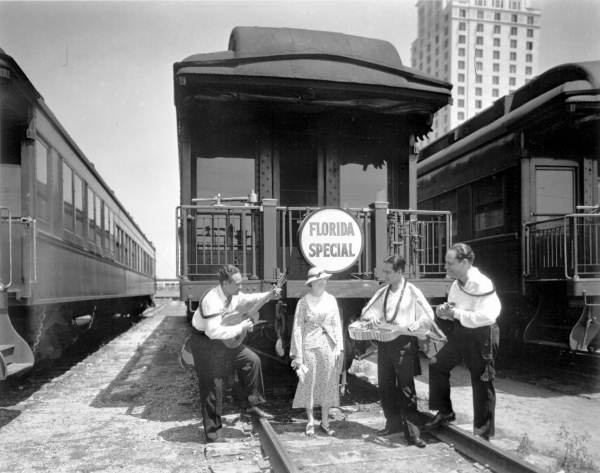
Trains such as the Florida Special helped make the state the tourist destination it is today.

=== Labor conflict ===
Having gained total control of the FEC by 1960, Ball sought to make the railroad profitable again by holding down wages. Despite the recommendation of a National Mediation Board convened by President Kennedy in 1962, Ball refused to grant FEC workers a 10-cents-an-hour raise, accepted by 192 other railroads, claiming that the FEC could not afford to raise wages. This led to a prolonged work stoppage by non-operating unions, beginning January 23, 1963, and whose picket lines were honored by the operating unions (the train crews).

Because the strike was by the non-operating unions, a federal judge ordered the railroad to continue observing their work rules, while the railroad was free to change the work rules for the operating unions, who were technically not on strike and thus had no standing in the federal court regarding the strike.

Ball's use of replacement workers to keep the railroad running during the strike led to violence by strikers that included shootings and bombings; a number of freight trains were derailed or blown up. Eventually, federal intervention helped quell the violence, and the railroad's right to operate during the strike with replacement workers was affirmed by the United States Supreme Court. The FEC continued operation with heavily reduced non-union crews (often former strikers), at the cost of a high turnover rate, low morale, and deteriorating infrastructure.

Most of the unions struck an agreement with the FEC in 1971; the United Transportation Union and the Brotherhood of Locomotive Engineers remained on strike until March 1, 1974, until the courts forced a settlement. According to historian Burton Altman:

After the settlement, workers were earning at least one dollar an hour less than their counterparts on other railroads. Wages were well below the industry's scale and the work force had been cut in half. When the strike began, 1,600 walked out. In time, 900 went back to work on the company's terms; others found employment elsewhere. Only about 100 stayed out until the end, and many of them could not return to work because they could no longer pass the required physical examinations or were too old to work. The end of the strike also ended their meager benefits that had enabled members to survive.

After Ball's death in 1981, Raymond Wyckoff took the helm of the company on May 30, 1984.

=== Strike's impacts on passenger service ===
From the beginning of the strike, the long-distance named passenger trains rerouted over an Atlantic Coast Line Railroad route through the central interior of the peninsula south from Jacksonville to Auburndale, and the Seaboard Air Line Railroad route south from Auburndale completed the trip to West Palm Beach and Miami. The strike and the resulting interior rerouting marked the end of long-distance coastal service between Jacksonville and West Palm Beach. Any resumed service later, in 1965, was strictly intrastate trains operated by the FEC.

Passenger service became a political issue in Florida during the early years of the labor strike, which essentially lasted 14 years, from 1963 to 1977. At the insistence of the City of Miami—which had long fought to get rid of the tracks in the downtown section just north of the county courthouse—Miami's wooden-constructed downtown passenger terminal was demolished by November 1963. Although a new station was planned at NE 36th Street and NE 2nd Avenue, it was never built.

Further, while freight trains were operated with non-union and supervisory crews, passenger runs were not reinstated until August 2, 1965, after the City of Miami sued and the Florida courts ruled that the FEC corporate charter required both coach and first class passenger services to be offered. In response, FEC sold "parlor car seating" for first class accommodations in the rear lounge section of a tavern-lounge-observation car. Train service operated daily, except Sunday. This new state-mandated passenger service consisted of a single diesel locomotive and two streamlined passenger cars, which, in addition to the operating crew, were staffed by a passenger service agent and a coach attendant, who were "non-operating". The mini-streamliner operated all of the way across three previously observed crew districts (Jacksonville to New Smyrna Beach to Fort Pierce to Miami). Following the letter of the law, the passenger service was bare bones. The trains carried no baggage, remains, mail or express and honored no inter-line tickets or passes. The only food service was a box lunch (at Cocoa-Rockledge in 1966). On-board beverage service was limited to soft drinks and coffee. Without a station in Miami, the 1950s-era station in North Miami became the southern terminus. This stripped-down service operated six days a week until it was finally discontinued on July 31, 1968.

== FEC in the 21st century ==
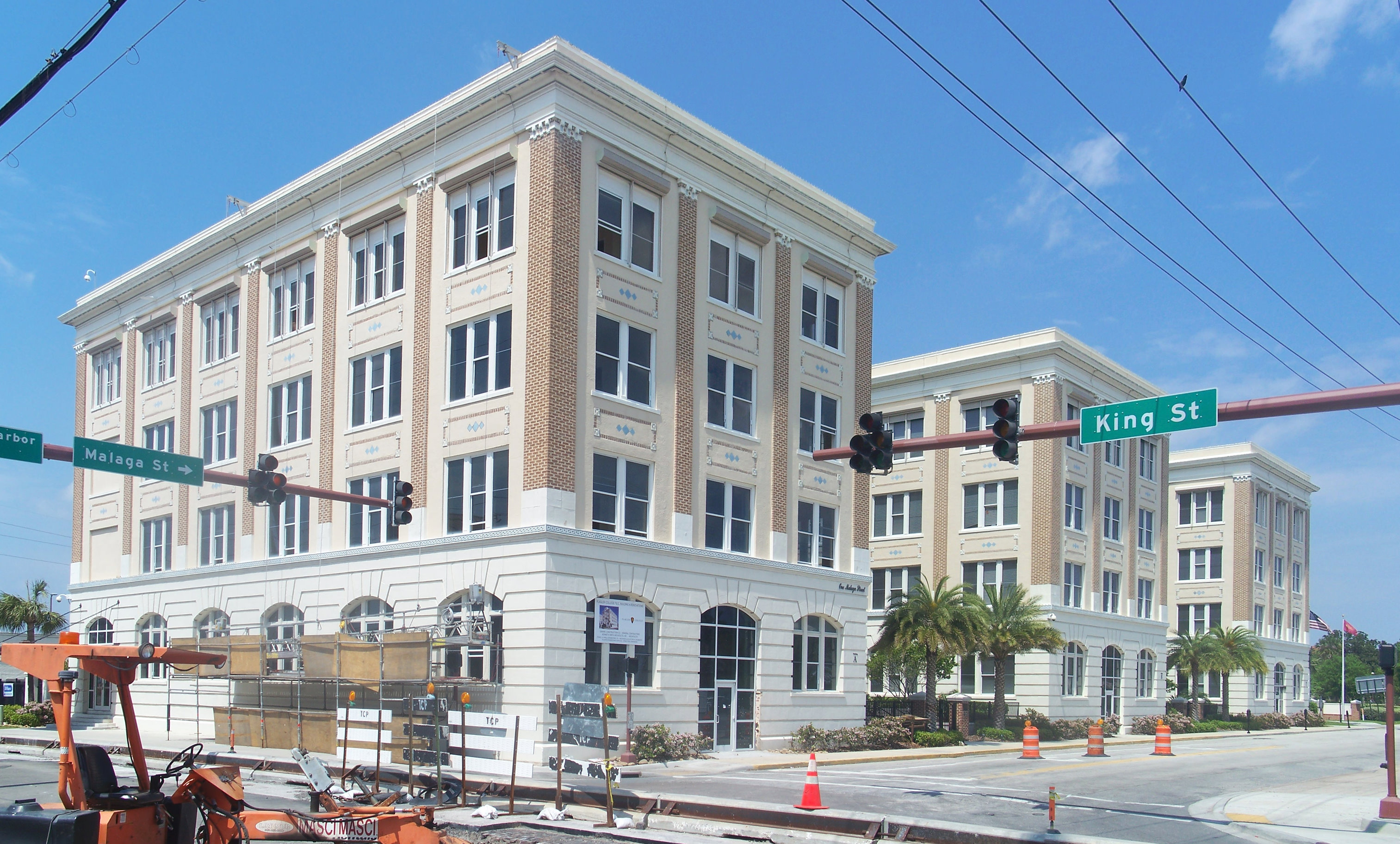
Old office buildings in St. Augustine

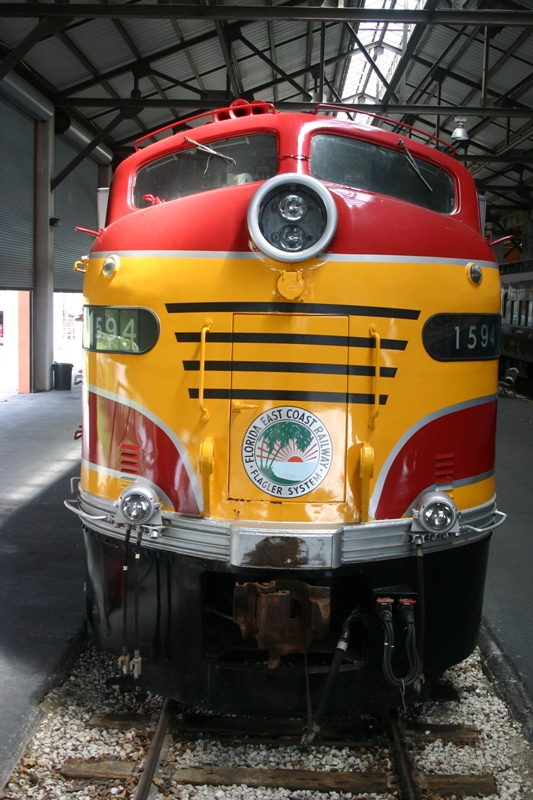
Florida East Coast Railway #1594 EMD E8A at Gold Coast Railroad Museum

=== Routing ===
The Florida East Coast Railway has operated from its relocated headquarters in Jacksonville since it sold the original General Office Building in St. Augustine to Flagler College in late 2006. Its trains run over nearly the same route developed by Henry Flagler, with the addition of the Moultrie Cutoff (St. Augustine to Bunnell), which was built in 1925 to shorten the main line south of St. Augustine.

=== Leadership ===
In March 2005, Robert Anestis stepped down as CEO of Florida East Coast Industries after a four-year stint, allowing Adolfo Henriquez to assume that position, with John D. McPherson, a long-time railroad man, continuing as president of the railway itself. By this time, the railroad had long since made peace with its workers.

In late 2007, in a move surprising to many employees and railroad industry observers alike, the FEC was purchased for over US$3 billion (including non-rail assets) by Fortress Investment Group, the principal investors who also control short line railroad operator RailAmerica. John Giles was named chairman, and David Rohal was named president. Both men were also principals with major responsibilities at RailAmerica as well, although the ownership of FEC and RailAmerica were not linked corporately, and the spinoff of RailAmerica as a publicly traded company did not include FEC.

In May 2010, James Hertwig was named as president and chief executive officer of the company effective July 1, 2010. Hertwig had recently retired from CSX, most recently having served as president of CSX Intermodal, one of CSX's major operating units.

James Hertwig retired as president and chief executive officer of the company effective December 31, 2017, and was replaced by Nathan Asplund as the railway was purchased by Grupo México and now manages it along with its other transport interests.

=== Operations ===
The FEC operations today are dominated by "intermodal" trains and unit rock (limestone) trains. Passenger service was discontinued in 1968 after labor unrest but later resumed (under a different operator) with the introduction of Brightline in 2018.

The company's major income-earning sources are its rock trains, transporting primarily limestone, and intermodal trains. FEC freight trains operate on precise schedules. Trains are not held for missed connections or late loadings. Most of the trains are paired so that they leave simultaneously from their starting points and meet halfway through the run and swap crews, so they are back home at the end of their runs. The FEC pioneered operation with 2 man crews with no crew districts, which they were able to start doing after the 1963 strike. The entire railroad adopted automatic train control (ATC) after a fatal 1987 collision caused by a crew not obeying signaling..

FEC has what is called by some a "prime" railroad right-of-way. The heavy weight of the rock trains required very good trackage and bridges. The railroad has mostly 136 pound-per-yard (66 kg/m) continuous-welded rail attached to concrete ties, which sits on a high quality granite roadbed. The entire railroad is controlled by centralized traffic control with constant radio communication. Because the railroad has only minor grades, it takes very little horsepower to pull very long trains at speed. 60 mph (97 km/h) trains are a normal FEC operating standard.

==== Passenger service ====
The FEC was already in the freight-only business when Amtrak was created and assumed passenger operations of nearly all U.S. railroads' passenger services in 1971. Periodically, there has been speculation that the southern end of the FEC line might be used for a commuter rail service to complement the existing Tri-Rail line (which follows former CSX tracks to the west). There has also been some discussion about Amtrak or the State of Florida using FEC lines for a more direct route between Jacksonville and Miami. The company has more recently indicated that it is open to allowing commuter rail services along its lines, with potential service areas in Miami-Dade County, Broward County, and Jacksonville's First Coast Commuter Rail.

In March 2012 FEC Industries (not FEC Railway) proposed a privately owned and operated service between Miami and Orlando along its route, to be named All Aboard Florida. New high speed trackage would be built between Brevard County (the oceanside county east of Orlando) and Orlando International Airport. In addition to the new track, the main line is once again being expanded to double track from Brevard County to Miami (some of the bridges still have adequate width from the previous double track). In 2014 the very first beginnings of All Aboard Florida commenced with studies and actual construction of the first phase, and construction began in November 2014. In 2015, AAF announced they would operate the service under the name Brightline. Since 2018, Brightline has had service on an initial stretch between West Palm Beach and Miami, with a station in Fort Lauderdale in between. In 2022, two additional stations in Boca Raton and Aventura were added. A new railway extension to Orlando International Airport started service in 2023, and a future rail expansion to Tampa is currently in the planning stages.

==== Rock trains ====
A lifeblood of the FEC is its transportation of high-grade limestone, which is used in the formulation for concrete and other construction purposes. The limestone is quarried near Miami in the "Lake Belt" area of Dade County and Broward County just west of Hialeah. The rock trains come out of the FEC yard at Medley in Miami-Dade County and the southern end of the FEC service area. Shipments currently are principally for materials dealers Titan and Rinker.

Rinker has since been sold and is now part of the multi-national Cemex. Rock train traffic dropped dramatically in 2008 with the elimination of all but one dedicated rock train. Other rock loads are now added onto other regular trains. Up until mid 2017, only one rock train remained, which is called the "unit train" and operates between Miami and City Point. Since then, rock traffic has rebounded, and the railroad has since added a second unit rock train which handles Ft. Pierce bound rock.

==== Intermodal services ====
The intermodal traffic includes interchanged shipments with CSX and Norfolk Southern, participation in EMP container service operated by UP and Norfolk Southern, United Parcel Service (UPS) piggyback trailers, trailers going to the Wal-Mart distribution center at Fort Pierce, and intermodal shipping container traffic through the ports of Miami, Port Everglades (adjacent to Ft. Lauderdale, Florida, and the principal source of imports), Port of Palm Beach/Lake Worth Inlet, and Port Canaveral.

Additionally FEC offers "Hurricane Service" offering trucking companies the opportunity of having their trailers piggybacked out of Jacksonville to save the expensive cost of back-hauling empty trailers.

Starting in 2012 the FEC began an aggressive project to reopen direct rail service to the ports of Miami, and Port Everglades. This is in anticipation of the expansion of the Panama Canal and the expected increase of intermodal traffic. In 2013 the drawbridge at the Port of Miami was repaired and reactivated and trains began to roll. In 2014 a new container shuttle was put into operation between Hialeah Yard and the Port of Miami. Also in 2014, the new rail lines into Port Everglades were opened, allowing direct access for FEC trains into the port. Further, a new transfer facility in Hialeah Yard will add additional intermodal transfer between trains, trucks, and planes. This facility opened in 2015. Additional capacity improvements are planned at other ports as well as the FEC's mainline.

==== Other freight ====
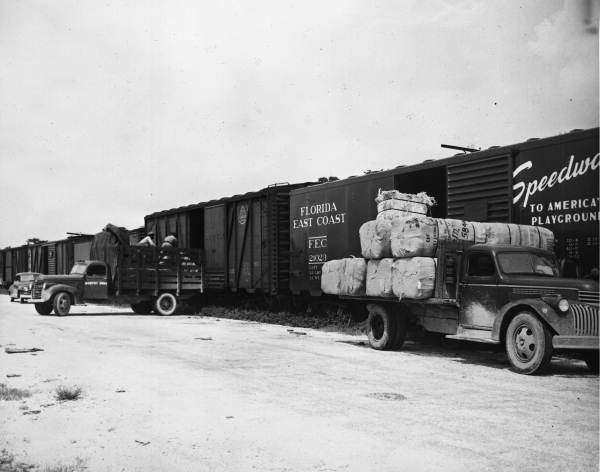
Produce being loaded into FEC refrigerated cars in the 1950s

The FEC also hauls normal "manifest" freight to and from points along its right of way. These cars are hauled on whatever train is going that way, so intermodal and rock trains routinely have some manifest cars in their consists.

Additionally, the FEC currently transports Tropicana Products "Juice Train" cars to and from one of the company's processing facilities located on the "K" Line. The Juice Train concept was developed by Tropicana founder Anthony T. Rossi in conjunction with Seaboard Coast Line Railroad (a CSX predecessor) beginning in 1970.

==== Motive power ====
The FEC completed its "second generation" dieselization with the purchase of 49 GP40s and GP40-2s and 11 GP38-2s, ranging in the 400's. Most of these locomotives were extensively rebuilt, with others being retired. In 2002, the FEC acquired 20 ex-UP SD40-2s, which were numbered in the 700s. These ex-UP locomotives remained in their original colors with FEC markings; however, as of 2014 seven of them had been repainted into the "retro" Champion scheme. As of 2015 most of these were leased to CSXT.

In 2006 the FEC leased four SD70M-2's numbered in the 100 series (100-103), in a blue and yellow livery known by fans as the "Classic" or the "Alaskan" schemes. In 2009 when RailAmerica came into the picture, they added four more SD70M-2's (104-107) in the red, pearl, and blue scheme, which was the standard RailAmerica scheme. That brought the total SD70M-2 count to eight.

Seeking further power improvements, in 2009, the FEC leased three CITX SD70M-2's, making the count now of 11 of the big EMD's. These locomotives were numbered 140, 141 and 142; all were blue and white striped units. All of the SD70M-2's served on the railway until the end of 2014, when they were replaced with new power. The fleet GP38-2s were used principally for yard and road switching as well as the occasional local. The others were used as available in road service. Some test runs were made to observe the effect on fuel consumption of dynamic braking and combinations of new and old power.

In 2014 the railway purchased 24 GE ES44C4s, its first General Electric and AC powered locomotives. All of the GE's were delivered by the end of 2014, with the first arriving on November 21, 2014. In 2015 the railway began to experiment with LNG fuel that will help with costs and efficiency. With the arrival of the GE's the majority of the FEC's SD40-2's and a number of the SD70M-2's were temporarily leased to CSXT. As of year end 2017, all SD70M-2's had been returned to their respective leasing companies. Most of the SD40-2's remained on the FEC with the exception of leases to other companies.

===== LNG fuel =====
FEC is the only US railroad actively using liquefied natural gas, a much cleaner fuel than diesel, to power its 24 dual fuel GE ES44C4 locomotives. The locomotives are used in pairs with an LNG fuel tender between them.

=== Statistics ===
In 1925 FEC carried 979 million ton-miles of revenue freight and 261 million passenger miles on (at year-end) 849 miles of road and 1411 miles of track; corresponding numbers for 1970 were 1345, 0, 554 and 1058.

In 2005 FEC owned and operated:

- 351 miles (565 km) of mainline track between Jacksonville and Miami, Florida
- 277 miles (446 km) of branch, switching, and other secondary track
- 158 miles (254 km) of yard track

Flagler Development owned and operated:

- 64 buildings
- 7.4 million rentable square feet

== Motive fleet ==
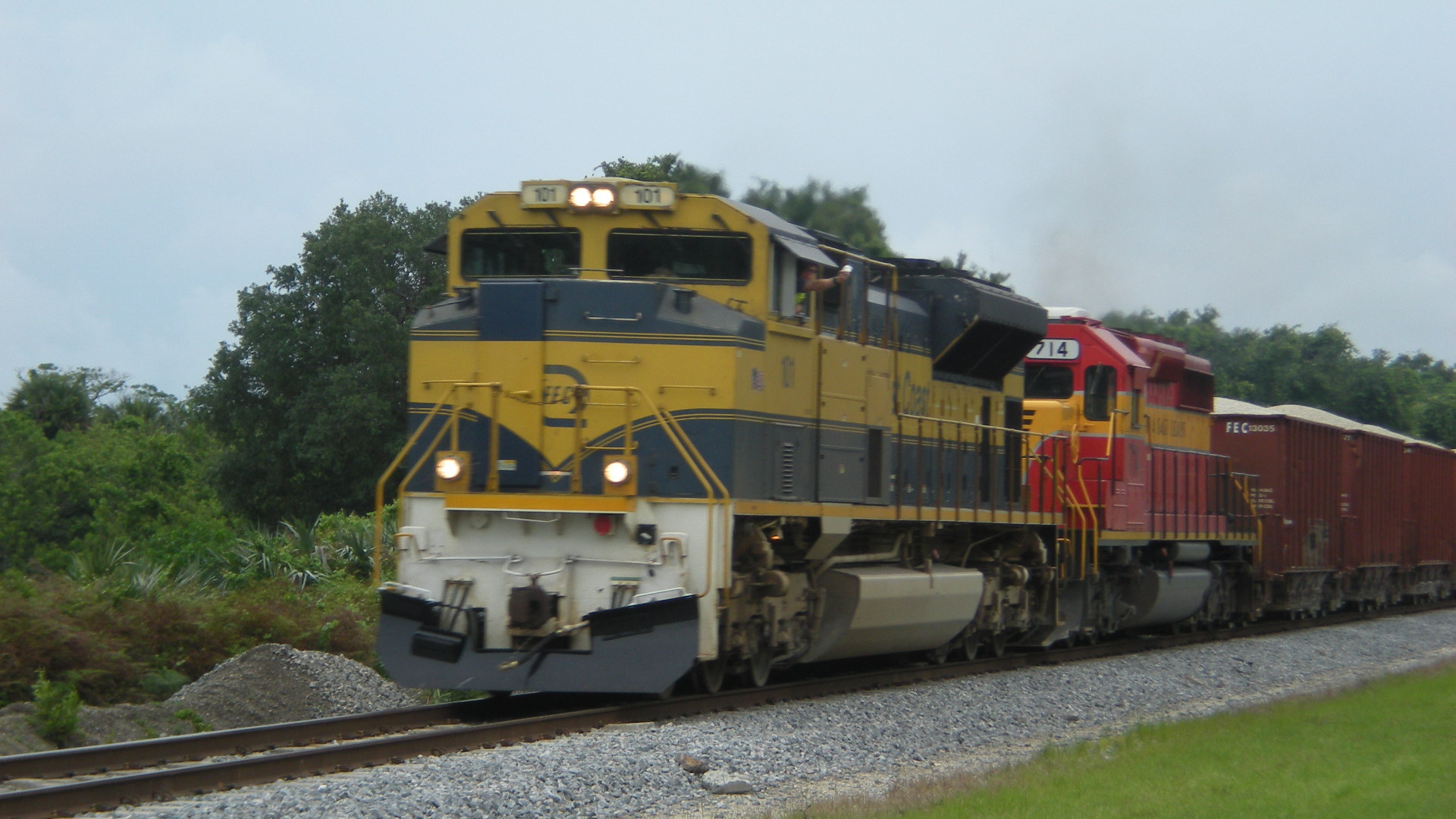
FEC202-02 with 101 & Champion 714.

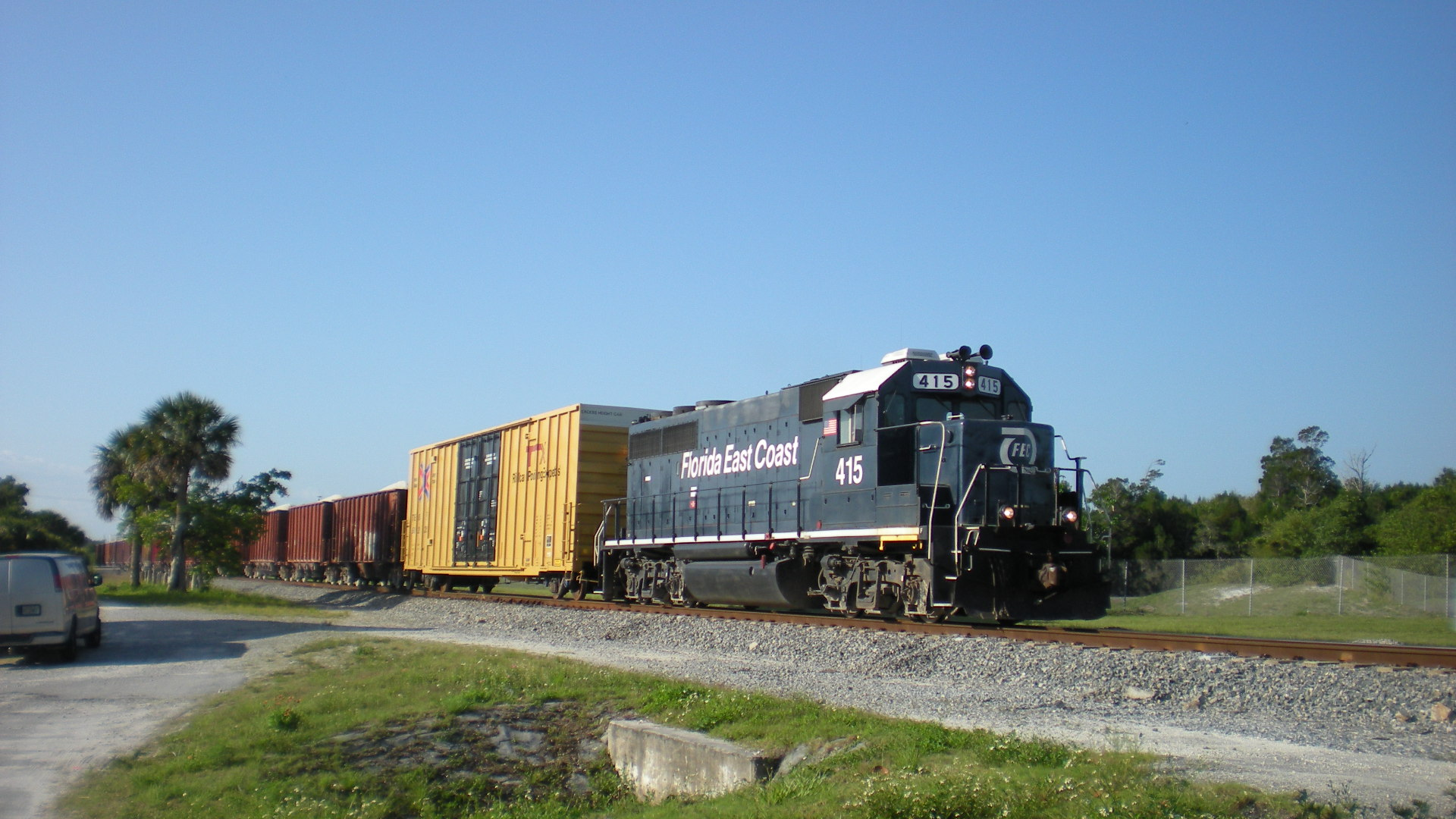
FEC920-06 (local) with 415 on lead.

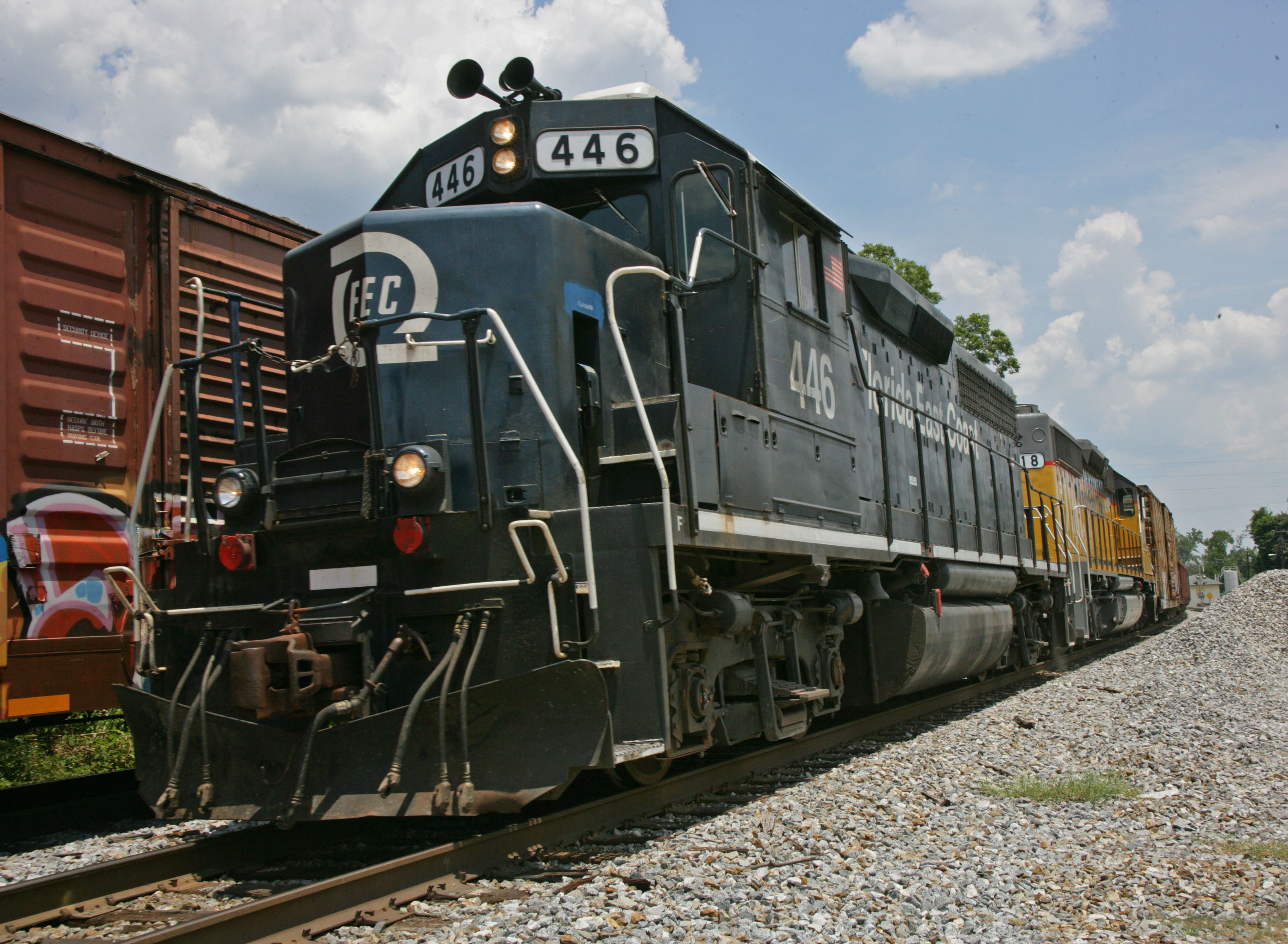
FEC #446, an EMD GP40-3

Road numbers	Model	Notes
100–107, 140–142	EMD SD70M-2	Numbers 104–107 are painted in RailAmerica's red, pearl and blue colors; Numbers 100–103 were sold off to the Vermont Railway and Providence and Worcester. Numbers 140–142 are painted in CITX blue with white stripes. 100–107 were leased from EMD and returned by the end of 2014. 140–142 are leased from CITX and scheduled to be returned by the end of 2014. CSXT leased FEC 104–107 in 2015, but they are now in storage at the FEC New Smyrna Beach Yard. CSXT also leased CITX 140, 141, and 142 but have been returned to the leaser.
401–410	EMD GP40	402 wrecked, parts traded in for #424. Reportedly, #406 was painted yellow, red & black and numbered 2000. 406 / 2000 along with the 403 left the property in 2013. FEC 2000 and 403 were the last pure GP40's left on the railway. All other GP40's have been scrapped or sent off to various RailAmerica roads.
411–414, 16–18, 20–22, 24–27, 29–38, 40 and 443	EMD GP40-2	423 reblt to #437; 426 on the cover of country musician Randy Dukes’ album Riding the Rails. 416 repainted into the 1960s "retro blue" in 2013 and a number of others have followed. FEC 434 was the very last GP40-2 ever built by EMD and is still in service on the railway. 412 and 414 have been repainted into a new livery applied by new owner Grupo México.
415, 419, 428, 439, 441	EMD GP40-3	
444–449	EMD GP40-3	Rebuilt GP40s; dynamic brake equipped. Off the property.
501–511	EMD GP38-2	502 acquired by Chesapeake & Albemarle Railroad. 503 and 504 acquired by North Carolina & Virginia Railroad. 501 and 507 have been repainted into "retro blue". 505 and 506 to the South Carolina Central RR. 509 acquired by Missouri and Northern Arkansas Railroad.
701–720	EMD SD40-2	Ex-Union Pacific; Nos 703, 711, 713, 714, 715, 716 & 720 were overhauled & repainted into a yellow, red and black scheme. These units are painted in what is referred to as the "Champion" scheme that was used on the FEC E-units. Unit 701 was completely destroyed after a derailment on May 9, 2009. All SD40-2 units except for 711 and 715 were being used by CSX as leasers in 2015–2016 and have returned to FEC.
2000	EMD GP40	Originally numbered 406 and was a commemorative unit painted in "champion-esque" yellow, red and black. This unit left the property in 2013.
Progress Rail 3576 & 3578	EMD SD40-2	
Progress Rail 9917	EMD SD40-2	
800–823	GE ES44C4	Delivered in November–December 2014; painted in the "champion" scheme.

== Awards and recognition ==
On May 16, 2006, FEC was the recipient of the Gold E. H. Harriman Award for safety in Group C (line-haul railroad companies with fewer than 4 million employee hours per year).

== Corporate history ==
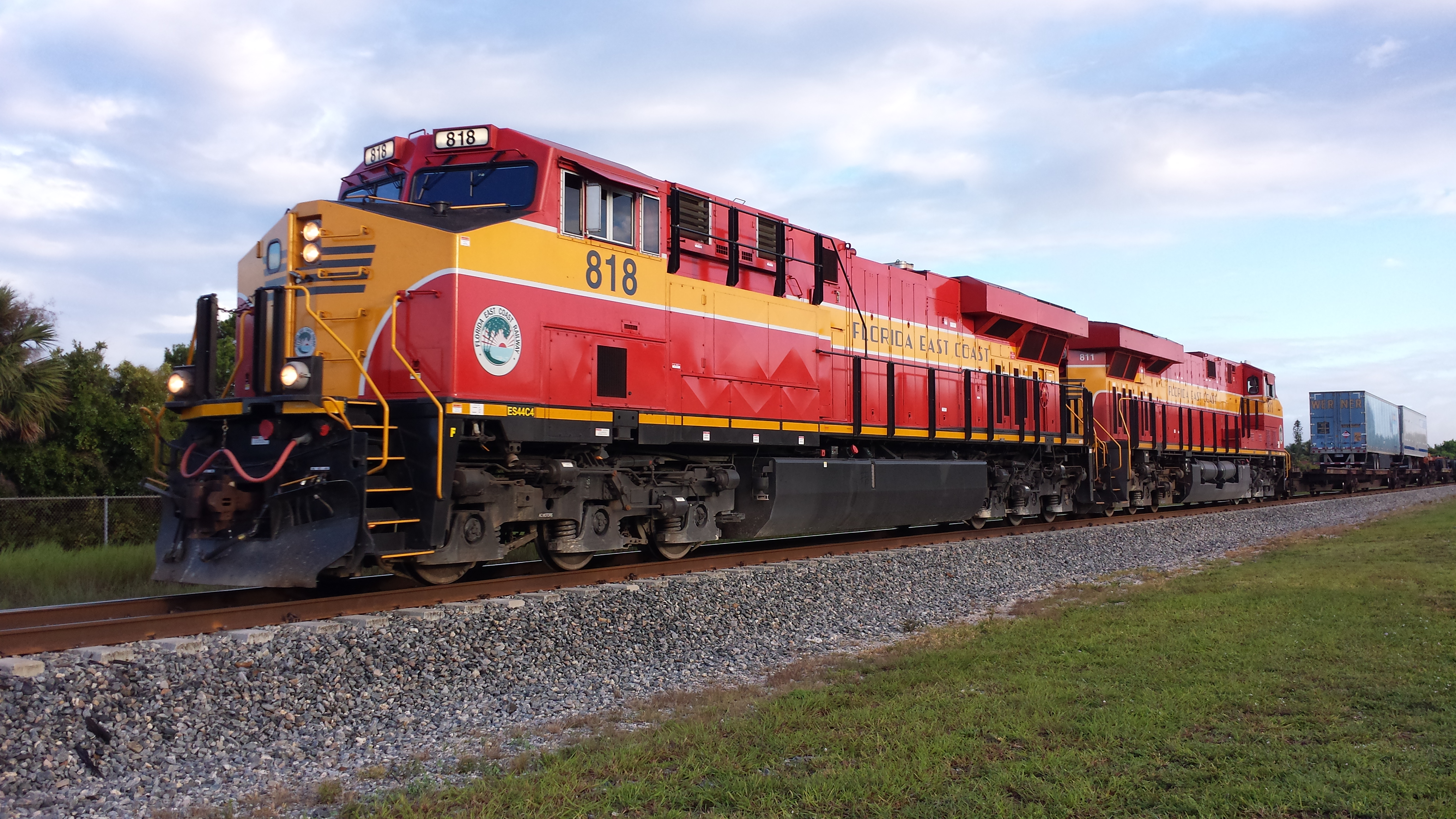
An FEC train led by a pair of ES44C4 locomotives in 2015

The Jacksonville, St. Augustine and Indian River Railway Company was incorporated under the general incorporation laws of Florida to own and operate a railroad from Jacksonville in Duval county, through the counties of Duval, St. Johns, Putnam, Volusia, Brevard, Orange, Osceola, Dade, Polk and Hillsborough.

Florida state law chapter 4260, approved May 31, 1893, granted land to the railroad. At that time, it was already in operation from Jacksonville to Rockledge, the part south of Daytona having been constructed by them. The company had just filed a certificate changing and extending its lines on and across the Florida Keys to Key West in Monroe County.

The name was changed to the Florida East Coast Railway Company on September 7, 1895.

Florida East Coast Industries (FECI) incorporated in 1983 and was made the holding company for the Railway and the Commercial Realty/Flagler Development Company in 1984. The other subsidiaries are Orlando-based carrier, "EPIK Communication" and the logistics firm, "International Transit".

FECI began operating independently of the St. Joe Company on October 9, 2000 when St. Joe shareholders were given FECI stock.

On May 8, 2007, Florida East Coast Railway Company's parent, FECI, announced that FECI would be purchased with private equity funds managed by Fortress Investment Group in a transaction valued at $3.5 billion. Fortress Investment acquired Florida East Coast Railway from Florida East Coast Industries in March 2008.

On July 7, 2017, Grupo México Transportes, subsidiary of Grupo México, completed the acquisition of Florida East Coast Railway. FECI retained their passenger trackage rights, which are now used for Brightline.

== Lines ==
Interactive map of Florida East Coast Railway's historic network, with current lines (red) and former lines (dark red).

=== Main line ===
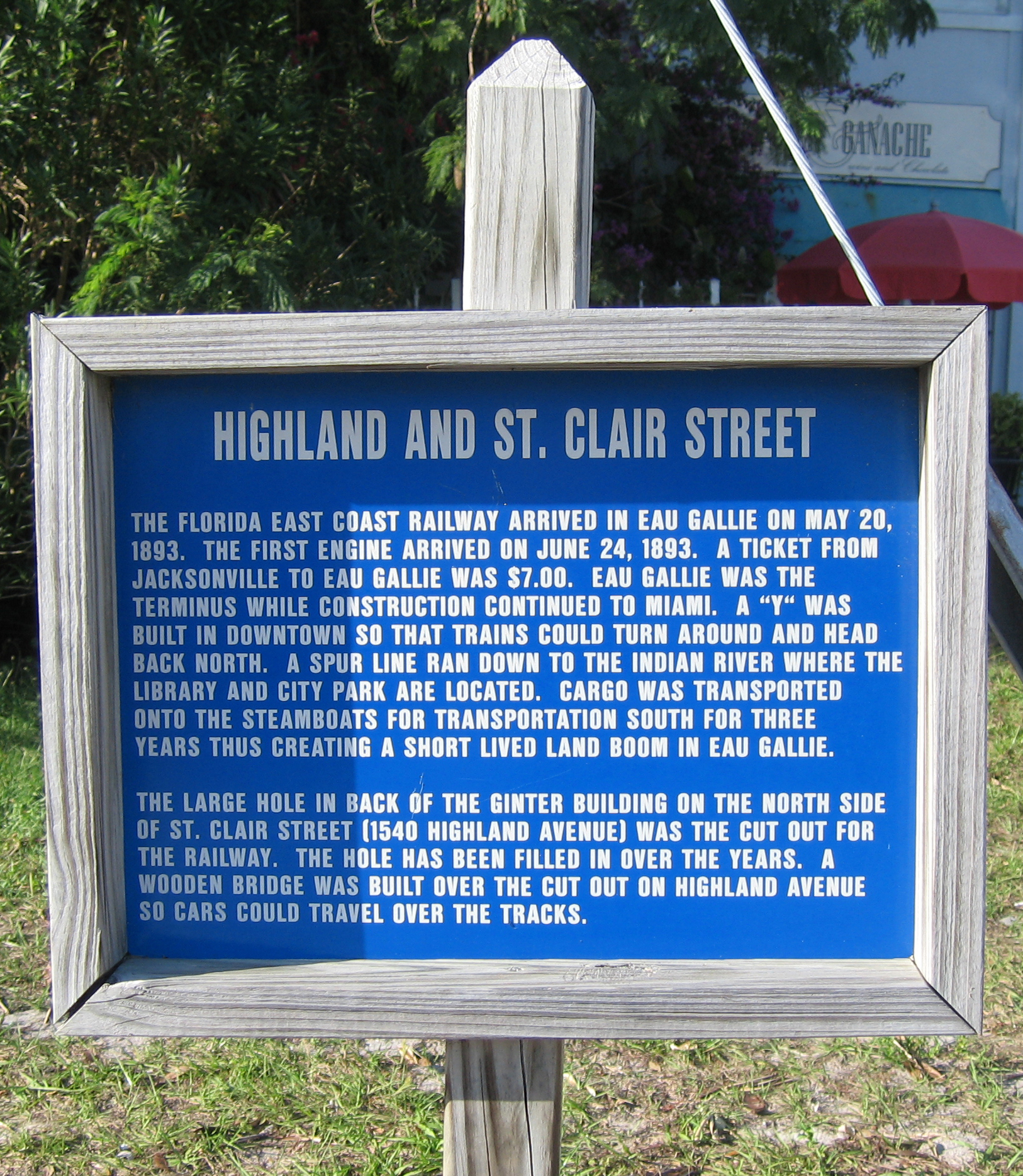
Historical marker

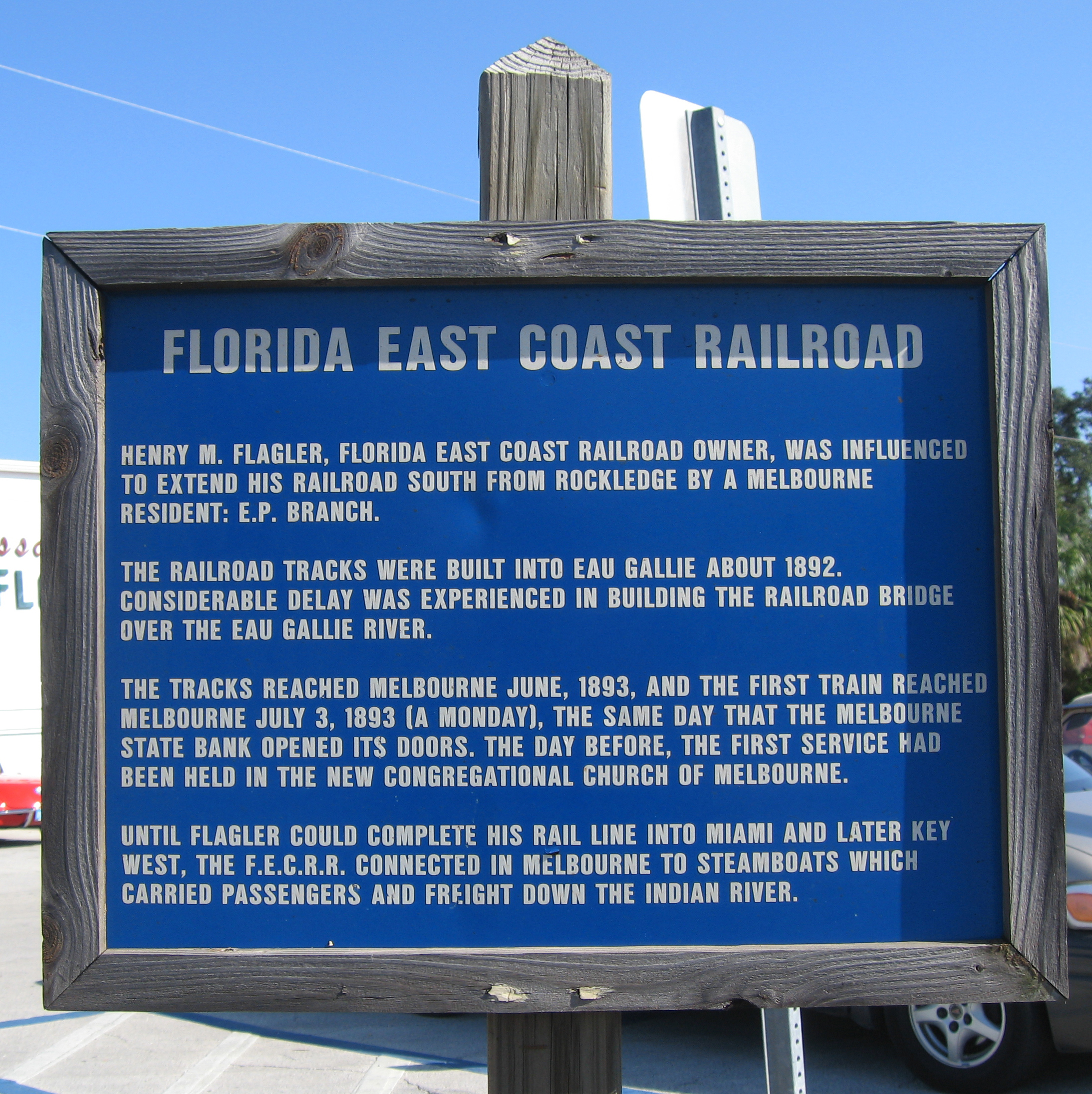
Historical marker

At its greatest extent, Florida East Coast Railway's Main Line ran from Jacksonville via Miami to Key West, a distance of over 500 miles. Today, the Main Line continues to run from Jacksonville to Miami.

Prior to 1925, the main line deviated from its current route between St. Augustine and Bunnell. From St. Augustine, it ran southwest to East Palatka on the St. Johns River before turning back southeast to Bunnell. In 1925, the Moultrie Cutoff was built to reroute the main line on to a more direct route from St. Augustine to Bunnell, bypassing the inland swing to East Palatka. The original main line remained in service after the Moultrie Cutoff was complete, but it was downgraded to branch status (Palatka Branch) and is now mostly abandoned. The milepost numbers on the main line still reflect the original route, causing the mileposts to abruptly jump from 67 to 86.4 in Bunnell today.

In 1926, the main line was double-tracked between Jacksonville and Miami in response to the Florida land boom of the 1920s. Bridges were rebuilt and Automatic Block Signals were also installed at the same time.

The Key West Extension was destroyed by the Labor Day Hurricane of 1935 and was not rebuilt with Florida City subsequently becoming the new southern terminus. The Overseas Highway (US 1) largely runs along the former Key West Extension right of way today.

In 1972, four years after the discontinuation of FEC's passenger services, work began to restore the main line to single track with passing sidings every 10 miles and Centralized traffic control. Also in 1972, FEC abandoned the main line from Miami south to Kendall, which included the demolition of the swing bridge over the Miami River in downtown Miami. The FEC sold the right of way of this abandoned segment to Miami-Dade Transit in 1979, who then built the southern half of Miami's Metrorail on the former right of way. Main line track from Kendall to Florida City remained in service at this time since it could still be accessed through the Little River Branch. By 1989, the remaining main line track from Kendall to Florida City (which had been the southern terminus since the abandonment of the Key West Extension in 1935) was abandoned. Today, the South Miami Dade Busway and South Dade Rail Trail run on the former right of way from Kendall to Florida City.

With the reintroduction of passenger service on the FEC via Brightline in the 2010s, most of the main line has once again been expanded to double track. Double track from Miami to West Palm Beach was completed in late 2017. Double track from West Palm Beach to Titusville has been completed as part of Brightline's second phase. Many bridges have been rebuilt along this segment as part of the project, despite the fact that many of the older bridges still have adequate width from the previous double track.

=== Kissimmee Valley Line ===
The Kissimmee Valley Line, also known as the Okeechobee Branch, ran from just south of New Smyrna Beach through the Kissimmee Valley roughly paralleling the main line. Branching off the Main Line at Edgewater, it headed southwest to Maytown, where it crossed the Enterprise Branch. From Maytown, it turned south and headed through largely rural agricultural land to Okeechobee, a small town on the north side of Lake Okeechobee. South of Holopaw, the line roughly parallels US 441.

Construction began at Maytown on February 25, 1911, and was completed to Okeechobee in 1915. The line was extended north from Maytown to Edgewater (just south of New Smyrna Beach) in 1916 to have its own connection to the Main Line.

By 1923, the branch was extended from Okeechobee southeast and around the eastern side of Lake Okeechobee to Belle Glade. The Interstate Commerce Commission had authorized the FEC to extend the line as far as Hialeah to connect with the South Florida network, but it was never built south of Belle Glade. The line was instead extended from Belle Glade west to South Bay and Lake Harbor on the south side of the lake at the Miami Canal in 1929. Here, it connected with the Atlantic Coast Line Railroad's Haines City Branch.

In 1947, the Kissimmee Valley Line was abandoned from Maytown to Marcy since it ended up not generating the agricultural traffic it had hoped to. At the same time, the remaining line south of Marcy to Lake Harbor was connected to the Main Line at Fort Pierce and is now part of the Lake Harbor Branch.

=== Lake Harbor Branch ===
The Lake Harbor Branch (K Branch) runs from Fort Pierce in St. Lucie County to Lake Harbor in Palm Beach County. It basically serves the sugar farms in Palm Beach and Hendry Counties. It branches off the main line in Fort Pierce and heads southwest to Marcy, where it turns south along Lake Okeechobee. At Lake Harbor, it connects to the South Central Florida Express's main line (a former CSX branch). South Central Florida Express began leasing the line from FEC in 1998 and now fully operates the line from milepost K 15 south. FEC serves local customers on the line from milepost K 15 north, with South Central Florida Express having trackage rights from there into Fort Pierce Yard on the main line. They also have a car haulage arrangement with FEC to Jacksonville to interchange with CSX and Norfolk Southern.

The Lake Harbor Branch was originally built in the 1920s and was the southernmost segment of the Kissimmee Valley Line until 1947, when the Glades Cutoff from Marcy to Fort Pierce was built and the rest of the Kissimmee Valley Line to the north was abandoned.

=== Little River Branch (Miami Belt Line) ===
The Little River Branch connects to the main line near Little River and heads south west toward Hialeah, where it turns south towards Hialeah Yard and Miami International Airport. The line sees significant freight traffic since Hialeah Yard has been FEC's main yard for the Miami area since the closure of Buena Vista Yard on the main line. The branch currently ends just south of the airport at Oleander Junction, where it connects with CSX's Homestead Subdivision and the South Florida Rail Corridor. An industrial spur also runs northwest from the line near Medley. The line was realigned in the 1980s to accommodate the extension of Runway 9/27 at Miami International Airport.

Built in 1923, the Little River Branch (also known as the Miami Belt Line) was historically a freight bypass around downtown Miami when the FEC main line continued south to Homestead and Florida City. The branch continued south past its current terminus at the airport and reconnected with the main line at Larkin, just north of Kendall. The line was double-tracked north of Hialeah Yard in 1925. When construction of the line was authorized by the Interstate Commerce Commission in 1923, the line from Little River to Hialeah was intended to be part of the extension of the Kissimmee Valley Line with track south to Larkin authorized as a branch line. The southern extension of the Kissimmee Valley Line was never built.

The branch was abandoned south of Oleander Junction in 2002. This abandoned segment is currently planned to become the Ludlam Trail linear park.

=== Palm Beach Branch ===
The Palm Beach branch was built to serve Flagler's hotels on Palm Beach island. When first built in 1895, the Palm Beach Branch ran from the main line east through West Palm Beach between Banyan Boulevard and Second Street (known then as Althea Street). It crossed the Lake Worth Lagoon and on to Palm Beach Island just south of Flagler's Royal Poinciana Hotel. The branch had passenger stations at both the Royal Poinciana and The Breakers, Flagler's other hotel on Palm Beach Island. The original branch was essentially the end of the FEC before the main line was extended south to Miami in 1896.

In 1902, Flagler's built his estate Whitehall for his wife Mary. Whitehall was across the branch's tracks from the Royal Poinciana Hotel. The estate's proximity to the branch prompted Mary to complain about the noise and smoke coming from trains at Whitehall. In response, Flagler promptly had the branch removed and relocated with a new trestle over Lake Worth Lagoon four blocks north. The branch then connected to the hotels on their north side and the bridge also included a pedestrian walkway for hotel patrons. The branch would remain service until 1935 when it was abandoned, a year after the closure of the Royal Poinciana Hotel.

After its removal, the former trestle became a toll bridge, which was replaced by the Flagler Memorial Bridge in 1938 (which carried State Road A1A until 2017 when a new bridge replaced the 1938 span). Much of the former right of way of this branch is still owned by the Town of Palm Beach.

=== Palatka Branch ===
The Palatka Branch (P Branch) ran from Moultrie Junction (just outside of St. Augustine) southwest to East Palatka before turning back southeast and reconnecting with the main line at Bunnell. There was also a spur with a bridge across the St. Johns River into Palatka, where there was a junction with the Jacksonville, Tampa and Key West Railway and the Florida Southern Railway (which would both become part of the Atlantic Coast Line Railroad's network).

The Palatka Branch was built by predecessors St. Johns Railway, the St. Augustine and Palatka Railway, and the St. Johns and Halifax River Railroad which all became the Florida East Coast Railway in 1895. The line was the Florida East Coast Railway's main line until the construction of the Moultrie Cutoff in 1925. After the completion of the Moultrie Cutoff between St. Augustine and Bunnell, the original main line though East Palatka remained in service and became the Palatka Branch.

The connection to Palatka and the bridge over the St. Johns River was removed in 1950, and track from East Palatka to Bunnell was abandoned in 1972. In 1983, track was abandoned from East Palatka to Hastings. The rest of the branch from Hastings was later abandoned in 1988 and all rail was removed to a point just west of I-95 near Vermont Heights. In 2001, rail service resumed up to this point and track was rehabilitated when new industries were located there. A daily local serves the eastern end of the line today known as the Wilber Wright Industrial Lead. Some of the right-of-way is now the Palatka-to-St. Augustine State Trail.

=== Enterprise Branch ===
The former Enterprise Branch (E Branch) was built in 1885 by the Atlantic Coast, St. Johns and Indian River Railroad and leased to the Jacksonville, Tampa and Key West Railroad (JT&KW), one of the Plant System railroads. Initially, the westernmost five miles (8 km) served as a connection from the JT&KW main line at Benson Junction (known then as Enterprise Junction) to Enterprise, a port for steamboat traffic down the St. Johns River. Later, the line was extended southeast from Enterprise through Osteen, Kalamazoo, and Mims to Titusville. In Titusville, it connected to the St. Johns and Halifax River Railway, which would become the Florida East Coast Railway main line. The Enterprise Branch would also cross the Kissimmee Valley Line at Maytown, which was built in 1911.

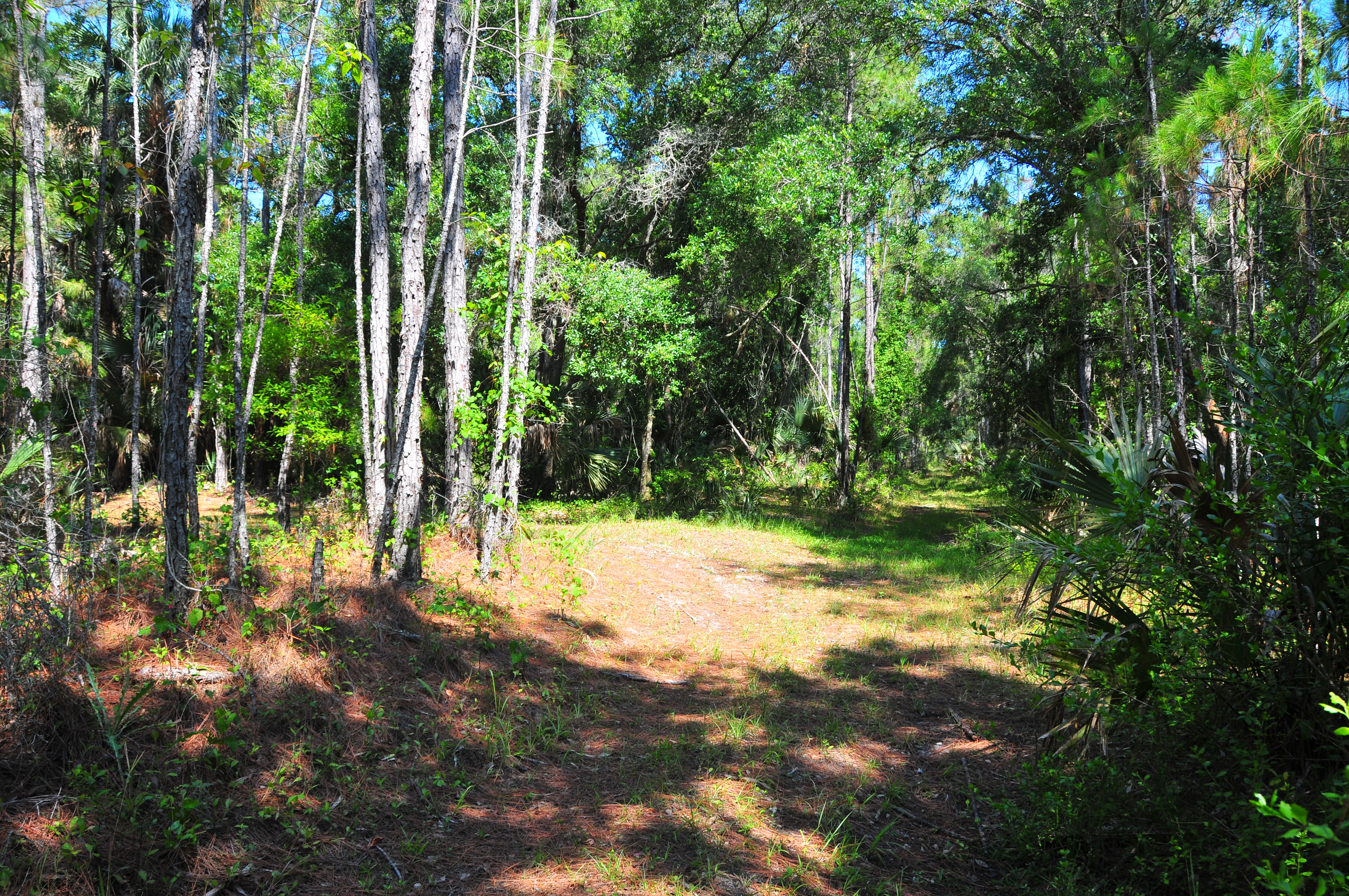
FEC Railway crossing at Maytown, Florida.

A steam locomotive pulled the first train over the line onto the wharf on the Indian River at Titusville on the afternoon of December 30, 1885, and greatly accelerated the transportation of passengers, produce, seafood, and supplies to and from central Florida. While Titusville thrived thanks to this new transportation connection, Enterprise lost stature as a steamboat port, since Henry Plant's railroad paralleled the St. Johns River and greatly reduced travel times to Jacksonville.

During the winter of 1894–95, a widespread freeze hit twice, decimating the citrus crop and ruining that part of Florida's economy. This allowed Henry Flagler to acquire the line at a discount to piece together what became the Florida East Coast Railway.

The track of the E Branch was removed from Benson Junction to Aurantia in 1972, ending directly under the Interstate 95 overpass. The crossing gates and signals between Titusville and Aurantia were removed before the summer 2004 hurricanes and track was later removed by a steel salvage company. By 2008, all remaining track of the E Branch had been removed.

The Florida Department of Environmental Protection took ownership of the rail bed on December 31, 2007. East Central Regional Rail Trail and the Florida Coast to Coast Trail now run along the former right of way.

=== Cape Canaveral Branch ===
In 1963, FEC built a branch from the main line from just north of Titusville east to Cape Canaveral. The branch included a causeway and drawbridge over the Indian River and ran to a point known as Wilson's Corner. The branch was built to serve the Cape Canaveral Space Force Station and what would become Kennedy Space Center.

FEC built two yards along the branch: Jay Jay Yard at the junction with the FEC main line, and Wilson Yard at Wilson's Corner. The US Army Corps of Engineers then built the NASA Railroad beyond Wilson's Corner with a line to the Vehicle Assembly Building and another line to the launch pads. The FEC would use the branch to deliver equipment to NASA for the Apollo program.

In 1984, FEC sold its portion of the branch to the NASA Railroad. The NASA Railroad has since been used to deliver segments of the Solid rocket boosters for the Space Shuttle and the Artemis program.

=== Ormond Beach Branch ===
The Ormond Beach Branch was a short branch that ran from the main line in Ormond Beach. It ran east from the main line over the Halifax River to the Ormond Hotel, which opened in 1888. Flagler acquired the Ormond Hotel in 1888 and expanded it to 600 rooms. The Ormond Beach Branch was built by the Ormond Bridge Company as a branch of the St. Johns and Halifax River Railroad (the original builder of the main line from East Palatka to Daytona) in 1887. The branch would also run past The Casements, which would be the winter home of John D. Rockefeller, the founder of Standard Oil and Flagler's former business partner. The Ormond Beach Branch was abandoned in 1932.

=== Fellsmere Branch ===
The former Fellsmere Branch ran from the main line at Sebastian west to Fellsmere. It was originally built by the Sebastian & Cincinnatus Railroad in 1896. In 1909, it was run by the Fellsmere Farms Company. In 1924, the line was taken over by the Trans-Florida Central Railroad. It was abandoned in 1952.

=== Orange City Branch ===
The former Orange City Branch (also known as the Atlantic and Western Branch) ran from New Smyrna Beach west to Orange City and Blue Spring on the St. Johns River. The branch was built by the Blue Spring, Orange City and Atlantic Railroad. In 1888, it became the Atlantic and Western Railroad. It later became part of the Jacksonville, St. Augustine and Indian River Railway, which changed its name to the Florida East Coast Railway in 1895. The line was in use until 1930.

=== Tocoi Branch ===
The railroad from Tocoi to Tocoi Junction (just west of St. Augustine), was built by the St. Johns Railway, an FEC predecessor (the original main line from Tocoi Junction to St. Augustine was also part of this line). The St. Johns Railway was built in 1858, making it the first FEC predecessor to be constructed. The Jacksonville, St. Augustine and Indian River Railway took it over by 1894, and changed its name to the Florida East Coast Railway in 1895. The Tocoi Branch was abandoned in April 1896, a year after the network was named the Florida East Coast Railway. This made the Tocoi Branch the first track to be abandoned by FEC. The right of way was later used for SR 95, which became State Road 214 at some time after the 1945 Florida State Road renumbering, and is now County Road 214.

=== Flagler Beach Branch ===
The railroad from Flagler Beach to Dorena, north of Bunnell, was built by the Lehigh Portland Cement Company in 1953. The line connected to the Lehigh Portland Cement Company Plant located near Flagler Beach. The line was abandoned in 1963, after a deadly strike erupted in that year that closed the massive plant. The site of the old plant was where some of the monorail beams were assembled for Walt Disney World Monorail System in the early 1970s. The route is now part of the rails to trails system. The plant has been demolished outside of one smokestack that will become a "lighthouse" for a new development. Some remains of the yard can be found in the woods near the eastern end of the Lehigh Greenway Rail Trail, which runs along the former right of way.

=== San Mateo Branch ===
The former San Mateo Branch ran from the main line just southeast of East Palatka south to San Mateo. It was built as a branch of the St. Johns and Halifax River Railroad (who built the original main line from East Palatka to Daytona) in 1892. The San Mateo Branch was abandoned in 1942.

=== Mayport Branch ===
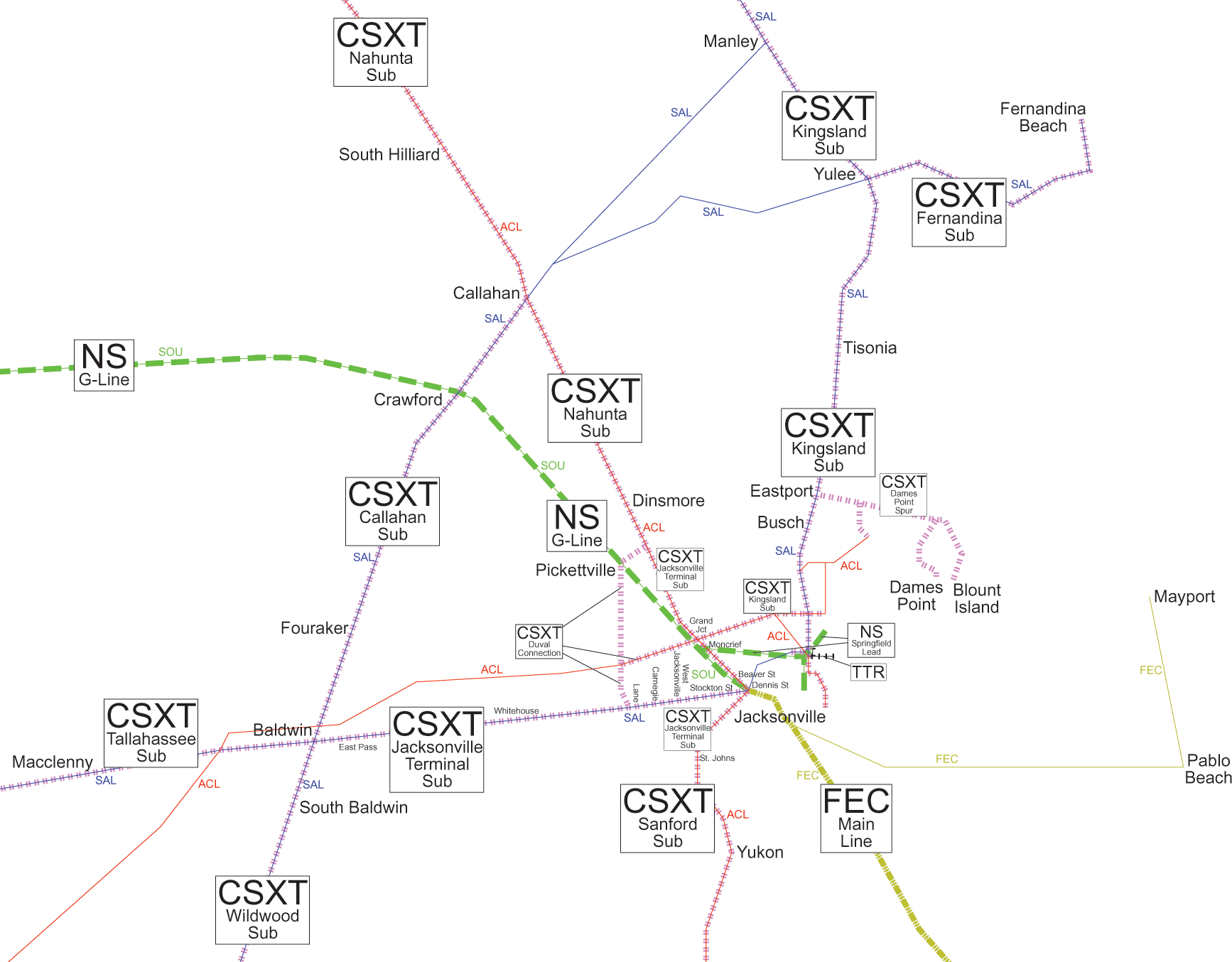
The former Mayport Branch on the lower right corner of this map of Jacksonville area railroads.

This was originally built by the Jacksonville and Atlantic Railroad, a 3 ft (914 mm) narrow gauge line from Jacksonville to Pablo Beach (now Jacksonville Beach). In late 1899 it was bought by Henry Flagler, who had the line converted to 4 ft 8 1/2 in (1,435 mm) standard gauge and extended it north along the coast to Mayport. The new branch opened in March 1900 and was abandoned in October 1932.

== Family tree ==
- Florida East Coast Railway – formed September 13, 1895, as a renaming of the Jacksonville, St. Augustine and Indian River Railroad; still exists
- Jacksonville, St. Augustine and Indian River Railroad – formed October 6, 1892, as a renaming of the FC&G; renamed the Florida East Coast Railway September 13, 1895
  - Florida Coast and Gulf Railway – formed May 28, 1892; renamed the Jacksonville, St. Augustine and Indian River Railroad October 6, 1892
  - Jacksonville, St. Augustine and Halifax River Railway – formed February 28, 1881, as a renaming of the Jacksonville, St. Augustine and Halifax River Railroad; merged with the Jacksonville, St. Augustine and Indian River Railroad October 31, 1892
    - Jacksonville, St. Augustine and Halifax River Railroad – formed March 1879; renamed the Jacksonville, St. Augustine and Halifax River Railway February 28, 1881
  - St. Augustine and Palatka Railway – formed September 1, 1885; merged with the Jacksonville, St. Augustine and Indian River Railroad 1893

== Historic stations ==
Main Line

Milepost	City	Station	Connections and notes
0.0	Jacksonville	Jacksonville	rebuilt in 1919 as Jacksonville Union Terminal junction with: Atlantic Coast Line Railroad Main Line (now CSX A Line); Seaboard Air Line Railroad Main Line (now CSX S Line); Southern Railway (now Norfolk Southern)
1.3	Jacksonville	South Jacksonville	junction with Mayport Branch
5.0	Jacksonville	Bowden Yard	
9.3	Jacksonville	Nesbit	
12.8	Jacksonville	Greenland	
15.2	Jacksonville	Bayard	
20.6		Durbin	
24.2		Woodland	
27.3		Sampson	
31.4		Magnolia Grove	
36.7	St. Augustine	St. Augustine	
37.0	St. Augustine	Moultrie Junction	north junction with Moultrie Cutoff
40.0	St. Augustine	Tocoi Junction	junction with Tocoi Branch
44.2		Hurds	
47.1	Elkton	Elkton	
49.0	Armstrong	Armstrong	
53.7	Hastings	Hastings	
57.4	Orange Mills	Orange Mills	
61.5	East Palatka	East Palatka	
	Palatka	Palatka	located on a spur across the St. Johns River junction with: Jacksonville, Tampa and Key West Railway (ACL); Florida Southern Railway Palatka Branch (ACL); Georgia Southern and Florida Railway (SOU); Ocklawaha Valley Railroad
62.8		San Mateo Junction	junction with San Mateo Branch
66.6	Yelvington	Yelvington	
68.8		Roy	
76.4		Dinner Island	
80.3		Neoga	
82.3	Espanola	Espanola	
86.6	Bunnell	Bunnell	south junction with Moultrie Cutoff
90.1	Dupont	Dupont	
97.6		Harwood	
99.0	Volusia	Volusia	
101.4		Tomoka	
104.2	Ormond	Ormond	
107.0	Holly Hill	Holly Hill	
109.8	Daytona Beach	Daytona	
112.5	South Daytona	Blake	
114.7	Port Orange	Port Orange	
119.3	Port Orange	Spruce Creek	
121.3	New Smyrna Beach	Turnbull Bay	
124.6	New Smyrna Beach	New Smyrna	junction with Atlantic and Western Branch
127.1	Edgewater	Hawkes Park	later renamed Edgewater junction with Kissimmee Valley Line
131.0		Hucomer	
136.4	Oak Hill	Oak Hill	
143.2		Lyrata	
143.5	Scottsmoor	Scottsmoor	
150.4		East Mims	
151.3	Titusville	Jay Jay	also known as Cape Canaveral Junction junction with NASA Railroad
154.4	Titusville	Titusville	junction with Enterprise Branch
157.7		Pritchards	
162.6		Delespine	
165.4		Frontenac	
167.7		Sharpes	
169.3		City Point	
173.1	Cocoa	Cocoa	later replaced by Cocoa-Rockledge station to be rebuilt nearby by Brightline as the Cocoa station
174.4	Rockledge	Rockledge	later replaced by Cocoa-Rockledge station to be rebuilt nearby by Brightline as the Cocoa station
		Rockledge Hotels	located on a spur across Indian River
179.4		Bonaventure	
182.7		Pineda	
189.8	Melbourne	Eau Gallie	
190.7	Melbourne	Sarno	
194.2	Melbourne	Melbourne	
197.4	Palm Bay	Tillman	later renamed Palm Bay
199.9	Malabar	Malabar	
203.3	Grant-Valkaria	Valkaria	
205.5	Grant-Valkaria	Grant	
208.6	Micco	Micco	
212.4	Roseland	Roseland	
214.5	Sebastian	Sebastian	junction with Fellsmere Branch
219.3	Wabasso	Wabasso	
221.9		Quay	
225.5	Gifford	Gifford	
227.8	Vero Beach	Vero	
231.1	Oslo	Oslo	
234.6	Viking	Viking	
238.9	St. Lucie Village	St. Lucie	
241.5	Fort Pierce	Fort Pierce	junction with Lake Harbor Branch
246.4	White City	White City	
247.2		Eldred	
249.0		Ankona	
252.4		Walton	
254.4		Eden	
256.7	Jensen	Jensen	
258.8	Rio	Rio	
260.5		Gosling	
261.2	Stuart	Stuart	to be rebuilt nearby by Brightline as the Stuart station
266.0	Port Salerno	Salerno	
266.3	Aberdeen	Aberdeen	
268.7		Fruita	
272.2		Gomez	
274.7	Hobe Sound	Hobe Sound	moved to a grove on Bridge Road west of Hobe Sound and still extant (Land purchased and developed into the Hobe Sound Polo Club and the old station now serves as the grounds office)
277.8		Likely	
283.3	Jupiter	Jupiter	later moved to 479 Seabrook Road, Tequesta to be used as a house. Now facing demolition.
290.5	Palm Beach Gardens	Monet	renamed Palm Beach Gardens
293.3	Lake Park	Kelsey City	renamed Lake Park
295.3	Riviera Beach	Riviera	
299.0	West Palm Beach	West Palm Beach	junction with Palm Beach Branch rebuilt a short distance south of original in 2018 by Brightline as the West Palm Beach station
300.0	Palm Beach	Royal Poinciana	located on Palm Beach Branch
300.1	Palm Beach	Breakers	located on Palm Beach Branch
306.1	Lake Worth	Lake Worth	
308.3	Lantana	Lantana	
309.4	Hypoluxo	Hypoluxo	
312.3	Boynton Beach	Boynton	
316.9	Delray Beach	Delray	
321.3	Boca Raton	Yamato	
324.6	Boca Raton	Boca Raton	restored and functioning as a museum nearby the Brightline Boca Raton station
327.0	Deerfield Beach	Deerfield	
331.1	Pompano Beach	Pompano	
338.3		Colohatchee	
341.2	Fort Lauderdale	Fort Lauderdale	rebuilt nearby in 2018 by Brightline as the Fort Lauderdale station
343.3		Port Everglades Junction	junction with Port Everglades Belt Line Railroad
345.9	Dania	Dania	
350.6	Hallandale Beach	Hallandale	
353.4	Ojus	Ojus	rebuilt nearby in 2022 by Brightline as the Aventura station
354.7	North Miami Beach	Fulford	
357.4		Arch Creek	
359.0		Biscayne	
360.6	Miami	Little River	north junction with Little River Branch
361.8	Miami	Lemon City	known today as Little Haiti
363.2	Miami	Buena Vista	
365.4	Miami	Miami	rebuilt in 2018 as MiamiCentral
370.9	Miami	Coconut Grove	
373.7		Larkin	south junction with Little River Branch
376.4	Kendall	Kendall	
378.6		Benson	
379.0		Keys	
380.2		Rockdale	
381.6	Perrine	Perrine	located just northwest of Cutler Bay
382.5	Peters	Peters	
385.8	Goulds	Goulds	
386.7		Black Point	
387.8	Princeton	Princeton	
389.3	Naranja	Naranja	
391.5	Leisure City	Modello	
393.9	Homestead	Homestead	
395.6	Florida City	Florida City	
Key West Extension
408.3		Everglade	
415.4		Jewfish	
417.1		Key Largo	
424.3		Rock Harbor	
430.8		Tavernier	
434.5	Islamorada	Plantation	
438.2	Islamorada	Quarry	now the location of Theater of the Sea
439.9	Islamorada	Islamorada	
442.0		Matecumbe	
445.3		Indian Key	
447.6		Midway	
449.2		Lower Matecumbe	
450.6		Craig	
455.0		Crescent	
457.2		Long Key	location of Long Key Fishing Camp
460.1		Tom's Harbor	
463.9	Marathon	Grassy	
470.8	Marathon	Vaca	
474.2	Marathon	Marathon	
476.8	Marathon	Knights Key Dock	
474.2		Pigeon Key	
484.0		Missouri Key	
485.2		Bahia Honda	
488.7		Spanish Harbor	
491.9		Big Pine Key	
495.0		Torch Key	
495.8		Ramrod Key	
499.9		Cudjoe Key	
503.0		Sugarloaf	also known as Perky
512.2		Big Coppitt	
514.8		Boca Chica Key	
518.2		Stock Island	
522.0	Key West	Key West	located on Trumbo Point

Kissimmee Valley Line

Milepost	City	Station	Connections and notes
0.0	Edgewater	Edgewater Junction	junction with Main Line
9.5	Creighton	Creighton	
17.6	Maytown	Maytown	junction with Enterprise Branch
24.0		Osceola	
28.8	Geneva	Geneva	
35.9	Chuluota	Chuluota	
39.4	Bithlo	Bithlo	
47.1		Pocataw	
51.5		Wewahotee	
		Narcoossee	
59.1		Salofka	
64.9		Tohopkee	Mail service terminated 1927
71.2		Holopaw	
79.8		Illahaw	Mail service terminated 1935
84.7		Nittaw	Mail service terminated 1935
90.0		Kenansville	named for Henry Flagler's third wife, Mary Lily Kenan
96.1		Apoxsee	
99.1		Lokosee	
106.1		Yeehaw	currently known as Yeehaw Junction
112.6		Osawaw	
118.9		Fort Drum	
122.9		Hilo	currently known as Hilolo
127.7		Efal	
131.8		Opal	
139.1	Okeechobee	Okeechobee	junction with Seaboard Air Line Railroad Miami Subdivision
For stations south of Okeechobee, see Lake Harbor Branch

Lake Harbor Branch

Milepost	City	Station	Connections and notes
K 0.0	Fort Pierce	Fort Pierce	junction with Main Line
K 14.0		Cana	
K 28.5		Marcy	junction with: original Kissimmee Valley Line; Seaboard Air Line Railroad Miami Subdivision (CSX)
K 14.0		Mantola	
K 38.2		Bessemer	
K 40.0	Port Mayaca	Port Mayaca	
K 45.1		Sand Cut	
K 49.7	Canal Point	Canal Point	
K 52.5	Pelican Lake	Pelican Lake	
K 55.6		Cardwell	
K 57.6	Runyon	Runyon	
K 61.6	Belle Glade	Belle Glade-Chosen	
K 63.0		Dahlberg	
K 64.5	South Bay	South Bay	
K 70.9		Lake Harbor	junction with Atlantic Coast Line Railroad Haines City Branch

Little River Branch

Milepost	City	Station	Connections and notes
LR 0.0	Miami	Little River	junction with Main Line
LR 4.6	Hialeah	Iris	junction with Seaboard Air Line Railroad Miami Subdivision (SFRC/CSX)
LR 8.5	Hialeah	Hialeah Yard	
LR 11.8		Oleander	junction with Seaboard Air Line Railroad Homestead Subdivision (CSX)
LR 14.7		Tropical Park	
LR 18.0		Kendall Junction (Larkin)	junction with Main Line

Enterprise Branch

Milepost	City	Station	Connections and notes
E 0.0	Titusville	Titusville	junction with Main Line
E 2.1		LaGrange	
E 4.3	Mims	Mims	
E 9.4	Aurantia	Aurantia	
E 16.5	Maytown	Maytown Junction	junction with Kissimmee Valley Line
E 16.8	Maytown	Maytown	
E 21.2		Cow Creek	
E 23.5	Farmton	Farmton	
E 29.5	Osteen	Osteen	
E 36.3	Enterprise	Enterprise	
E 40.1		Benson Junction	junction with Jacksonville, Tampa and Key West Railway (ACL)

== See also ==
- Grupo México
- Boca Express Train Museum
- Florida tourism industry
- Notable passenger trains operated over FEC rails: (sponsoring railroads and destinations)
  - Champion-east coast section (Atlantic Coast Line, New York City)
  - City of Miami (Illinois Central, Chicago)
  - Dixie Flagler (Louisville & Nashville, Chicago & St. Louis)
  - Dixie Flyer (Louisville & Nashville, Chicago & St. Louis)
  - Ponce de Leon (Southern Railway, Cincinnati)
  - Royal Palm (Southern Railway, Cincinnati)
  - South Wind (Louisville & Nashville, Chicago)

Preceded by Buffalo and Pittsburgh Railroad	Regional Railroad of the Year; 2007	Succeeded by South Kansas and Oklahoma Railroad
