= NASA Railroad =

Short-line railroad at the Kennedy Space Center

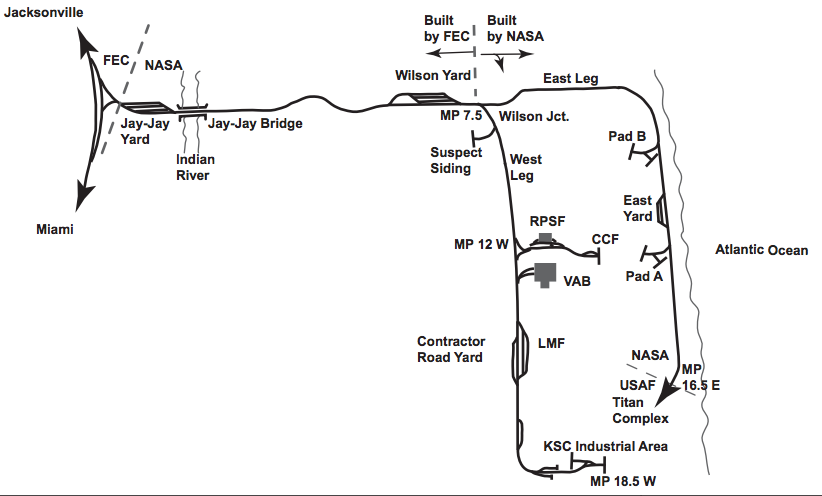
- NASA Railroad and connector to Florida East Coast Railway

Overview
- Headquarters: Cape Canaveral, Florida
- Reporting mark: NLAX
- Locale: Kennedy Space Center
- Dates of operation: 1963–present

Technical
- Track gauge: 4 ft 8 1/2 in (1,435 mm) standard gauge
- Electrification: No
- Length: 38 mi (61 km)

The NASA Railroad (reporting mark NLAX) is a Class III industrial short-line railroad at the Kennedy Space Center in Cape Canaveral, Florida. The railroad consists of 38 miles (61 km) of track connecting the mainline of the Florida East Coast Railway and trackage at the Cape Canaveral Space Force Station. NASA uses the railroad to deliver large or bulk materials to support its operations, particularly solid rocket boosters and chemicals such as helium and oxygen for rocket fuel.

== History ==
In 1963, the Florida East Coast Railway (FEC) constructed a 7.5 miles (12.1 km) branch from its mainline to the Kennedy Space Center just north of Titusville. This connection joined 28 miles of NASA-constructed track at a junction named Wilson's Corners. The FEC built two yards, a seven-track yard originally called Cape Canaveral Junction (now known as Jay Jay Yard), and a second seven-track yard called Wilson Yard. East of Wilson Yard, the line divided with the nine-mile "West Leg" branch going south to NASA's Vehicle Assembly Building and the Kennedy Space Center Industrial Area, and the other nine-mile "East Leg" branch which ran along the Atlantic Ocean to serve launch pads 39A and 39B, as well as to interchange with the former Cape Canaveral Air Force Station railroad.

During its first five years of operation, the railroad delivered over 30,000 carloads of aggregate that was used to construct the crawlerway that connected the Vehicle Assembly Building to the launch pads at LC-39. During the Apollo program, the railroad regularly transported the 56 carloads of propellant that was required to fuel each Saturn V rocket and even ferried Apollo astronauts to an area known as "The Sandpile," which was used as a lunar testing ground. During the late 1970s, as NASA transitioned from the Apollo to the Space Shuttle program, it acquired three World War II-era ex-U.S Army ALCO S-2 locomotives, which provided local switching around the Vehicle Assembly Building and within the KSC Industrial Area.

In June 1983, NASA purchased the 7.5 miles (12.1 km) portion of the railroad line owned by the FEC, which included the drawbridge over the Indian River. It was during this time that NASA decided to completely rebuild and upgrade the railroad due to the hazardous materials that were being hauled, particularly the solid rocket booster segments for the space shuttle. The original track was a combination of 100 pounds (45 kg) and 112 pounds (51 kg) jointed rail laid on wooden cross-ties with crushed limestone ballast. It was replaced with 132 pounds (60 kg) continuous welded rail laid on concrete cross-ties. The work was done by the track maintenance subsidiary of the FEC and was constructed to 60 mph (97 km/h) standards, which was FEC's mainline running speed. However, normal operating speed was kept to 25 mph (40 km/h) or less to reduce maintenance and increase the life span of the track. Soon after the railroad was rebuilt, NASA replaced the aging ALCO S-2 locomotives with three EMD SW1500 locomotives, which were built between 1968 and 1970 for the Toledo, Peoria and Western Railway. Each locomotive was painted into the NASA Railroad red, gray and black color scheme and were renumbered 1, 2 and 3. They were stored and maintained in-house at the NASA Railroad Shop at KSC.

NASA primarily used the railroad to transport equipment which could not be transported over the road to and from other NASA locations. Rail transportation also offered cost savings over transporting bulky and heavy cargo via barge or aircraft. Much of the rail traffic was devoted to sending segments of the reusable solid rocket boosters (SRB) from the Thiokol plant in Utah back again for refurbishment after Space Shuttle launches and recovery. A total of 24 cars were devoted to transporting the SRBs. However, with the end of the Shuttle program in 2011, the railroad's future became uncertain and went under review by the government. One possibility that was being considered was the delivery of equipment for private space launches at Cape Canaveral. In 2012, the program's helium tank cars, a liquid oxygen tank car, and a liquid hydrogen tank car (all of which were acquired from the U.S. Bureau of Mines) were transferred for delivery to the SpaceX engine test complex outside McGregor, Texas, where they were re-purposed to support their engine tests. Eight other cars were shipped to California and are currently on lease to SpaceX to support Falcon 9 rocket launches from Space Launch Complex-4 at Vandenberg Air Force Base. SpaceX already uses three helium tank cars at Space Launch Complex-40 on Cape Canaveral Space Force Station in Florida, which were previously used for the shuttle program.

In 2014, NASA donated locomotive #2 to the Gold Coast Railroad Museum in Miami where it is operational as of 2026. In spring 2015, it was announced that the NASA railroad would formally cease operations. The remaining two locomotives, #1 & #3, were pulled from service and delivered via the Florida East Coast Railway to their respective new homes. Locomotive #1 was sold to the Natchitoches Parish Port in Natchitoches, Louisiana, while locomotive #3 was sold to the Madison Railroad in Madison, Indiana, where it is used for regular freight service and passenger excursion train service. By 2016, much of the trackage along the East Leg as well as in the KSC Industrial Area had been pulled up and was presumably scrapped, while the majority of trackage along the West Leg was left in place and simply taken out of service.

In 2020, NASA reopened the railroad to support the new Space Launch System (SLS) vehicle. The railroad took delivery of a train loaded segments of the two shuttle-derived solid fuel rocket boosters that will be used on the initial flights of the SLS. Each booster will provide 3.6 million lb (1.6 million kg) of thrust by adding one additional solid fuel propellant segment to the modified shuttle boosters (five sections for the SLS versus four for the STS). This SLS booster will be the largest, most powerful solid propellant boosters ever built. The boosters are by manufactured Northrop Grumman (formerly Orbital ATK) in Utah and shipped cross-country to KSC by rail. As recently as 2026, Florida East Coast railway number 430, an EMD GP40-2 was spotted transporting a consist carrying components of the SRBs for Artemis III.

== Equipment ==
The NASA Railroad formerly operated three SW1500 switcher locomotives, each former Toledo, Peoria and Western Railway units, as well as 75 railroad cars. The fleet was maintained by the NASA Railroad shop, which also maintained locomotives and railcars for the Cape Canaveral Space Force Station. Upon the railroad's reopening in 2020, several industrial railcar movers were purchased by NASA and currently serve as the railroad's only form of motive power.

=== Locomotives ===
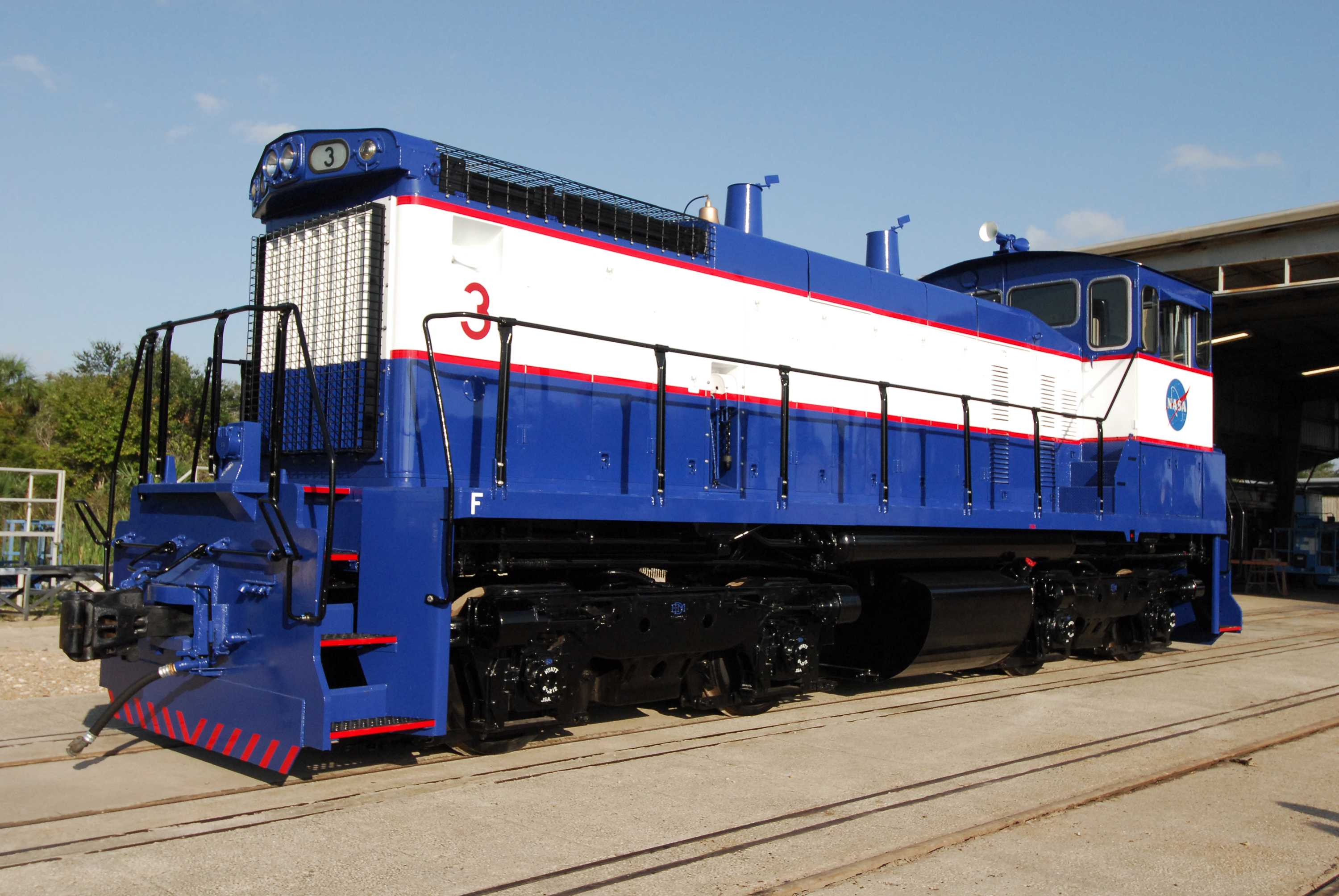
Locomotive #3 outside of the maintenance shops at KSC

Model	Built	Acquired	Number	Disposition
EMD SW1500	1968	1983	1	Natchitoches Parish Port, April 2015
EMD SW1500	1970	1983	2	Gold Coast Railroad Museum, March 2014
EMD SW1500	1970	1983	3	Madison Railroad, April 2015

=== Rolling stock ===
Type	Built	count
Flat car, spacer, 70-ton	1952	2
Flat car, aft SRB skirt, 70-ton	1985	2
Flat car, 90-ft	1961–1969	8
Flat car, 60-ft; 100-ton	1968	3
Flat car, pig, 70-ton	1968	2
Flat car, 100-ton	1952	14
Flat car, 65-ft; 90-ton	1965	1
Helium car	1961	13
Nitrogen car		2
Hopper car, 100-ton	1968–1979	11
Tank car, 70-ton	1982	2
Tank car, 100-ton	1962, 1975	4
Gondola car, 60-ft	1966, 1960	2
Gondola car, 74-ft; 100-ton	1976	2
Cover car	1960	2
Boxcar, 70-ton	1970	1
Total		75

== See also ==
- List of United States railroads
  - List of Florida railroads
