= Joseph R. Parrott =

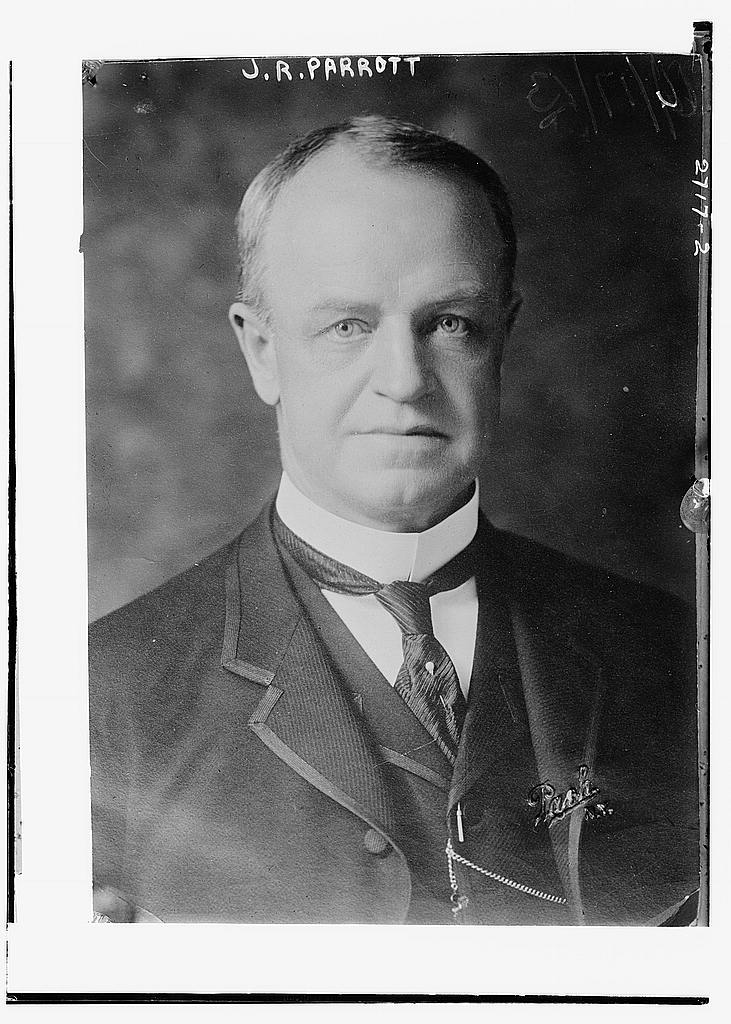
Joseph R. Parrott circa 1913

Joseph Robinson Parrott (October 30, 1858 – October 13, 1913) was President of the Florida East Coast Railway. He died in Maine on October 13, 1913. He graduated from Yale University in 1883, where he was a member of Skull and Bones. He was a close associate of Henry Flagler. A car ferry was named for him.
