= Nick Wynne =

American historian (born 1943)

- Born: Lewis Nicholas Wynne; May 23, 1943 (age 83); McRae, Georgia, U.S.
- Other name: Carolyn Teicher Potts
- Education: University of Georgia (BA, MA, PhD)
- Occupations: Historian, educator, author
- Spouse: Debra Wynne
- Website: nickwynnebooks.com

Lewis Nicholas "Nick" Wynne (born May 23, 1943) is an American historian, educator, and author. He writes fiction and history books. Wynne is the director-emeritus of the Florida Historical Society. He has used the pseudonym Carolyn Teicher Potts.

== Life and career ==
Nick Wynne was born on May 23, 1943, in McRae, Georgia. He attended Telfair County High School, and graduated in 1961. He served three years in the United States Army, including overseas in Eritrea, and Ethiopia. Wynne attended college on the G.I. Bill. When he was working on his PhD, Wynne taught at the Southern Technical Institute (now Southern Polytechnic State University) in Marietta, Georgia, where he earned tenure status.

Wynne graduated with a B.A. degree in 1970, an M.A. degree, and a PhD in 1980 from the University of Georgia in Athens, Georgia.

He was interested in studying Florida history, and decided to move shortly after graduation. Wynne lives in Rockledge, Florida with his wife Debra, she has served as the president of the Brevard Heritage Council in Cocoa, Florida.

He has written more than two dozen books, many on historical subjects, including the history of tourism in Florida. He previously served as executive director of the Florida Historical Society in Cocoa, Florida, from 1987 until 2008. Wynne has written articles for Vero Beach Magazine. He was interviewed for a podcast in 2012. Wynne is friends with fellow Florida historian Joe Knetsch, and they have published a few books together.

== Publications ==
- Wynne, Nick (September 23, 1999). Tin Can Tourists in Florida, 1900–1970. Arcadia Publishing. ISBN 9780738502168.
- Wynne, Nick (May 15, 2007). Florida Tales: Historical Adventures for Young Floridians: The Short Stories of Carolyn Teicher Potts. Florida Historical Society Press. ISBN 9780977107964.
- Moorhead, Richard; Wynne, Nick (June 20, 2009). Golf in Florida: 1886–1950. Arcadia Publishing. ISBN 978-0-7385-6841-6.
- Wynne, Nick; Moorhead, Richard (February 12, 2010). Paradise for Sale: Florida's Booms and Busts. Arcadia Publishing. ISBN 9781596298446.
- Knetsch, Joseph; Wynne, Nick (February 11, 2011). Florida in the Spanish-American War. Arcadia Publishing. ISBN 9781609490881.
- Wynne, Nick; Moorhead, Richard (August 5, 2011). Florida in World War II, Floating Fortress. Arcadia Publishing. ISBN 9781596299290.
- Wynne, Nick; Knetsch, Joe (November 20, 2012). Florida in the Great Depression, Desperation and Defiance. Arcadia Publishing. ISBN 9781609498061.
- Wynne, Nick; Knetsch, Joe (August 31, 2015). On This Day in Florida Civil War History. Arcadia Publishing. ISBN 9781467118170.
- Wynne, Nick; Knetsch, Joe (December 12, 2016). Utopian Communities of Florida: A History of Hope. Arcadia Publishing. ISBN 9781467136884.
- Wynne, Nick; Knetsch, Joe, eds. (October 11, 2017). Edge of Armageddon: Florida and the Cuban Missile Crisis. Outskirts Press. ISBN 9781478702474.
- Wynne, Nick; Knetsch, Joe (April 21, 2022). Cousin Bob: The World War II Experiences of Robert Morris Warren. Outskirts Press, Incorporated. ISBN 9781977250278.
- Knetsch, Joe; Wynne, Nick; Redd, Robert (May 1, 2023). Florida at Sea: A Maritime History. Arcadia Publishing. ISBN 9781467154109.
