= Madison Railroad =

Short-line railroad in Indiana, U.S.

Overview
- Reporting mark: CMPA
- Locale: Indiana
- Dates of operation: 1976–present

Technical
- Track gauge: 4 ft 8 1/2 in (1,435 mm) standard gauge

The Madison Railroad (reporting mark CMPA), a division of the City of Madison Port Authority, is a 26-mile (42 km) short-line railroad in southeastern Indiana. The Madison Railroad begins along the Ohio River in the western part of the city of Madison and from there runs generally northwest through Jefferson County, then crosses into Jennings County and terminates near its intersection with the CSX line in North Vernon.

== History ==
The roadbed on which the Madison Railroad operates traces its history back to some of the earliest railway companies in Indiana history. First established by the Madison, Indianapolis and Lafayette Railroad in 1843 (182 years ago), the line eventually became part of the Jeffersonville, Madison and Indianapolis Railroad by 1866. In 1890, the JM&I was part of a merger creating the Pittsburgh, Cincinnati, Chicago and St. Louis Railway, which was controlled by the Pennsylvania Railroad (PRR). Passing down through various PPR subsidiaries, it ended up getting caught up in eventual successor Penn Central's 1970 bankruptcy.

The portion of track between North Vernon and Madison was not included in the 1975 Final System Plan (FSP) for Conrail, which was to take over the PC and several other bankrupt railways in 1976. Facing the complete loss of rail access to Madison, that city's port authority stepped in and eventually purchased that section of the line. They now continue to operate on it as the Madison Railroad.

A 16.8-mile (27.0 km) portion of the original line between North Vernon and Columbus, Indiana was eventually dropped from the FSP before Conrail began operations in 1976. The rest of the original line from Columbus north to Indianapolis is now owned by the Louisville and Indiana Railroad (LIRC), which bought it from Conrail in March 1994.

NASA Railroad's third switcher was delivered to Madison Railroad after it discontinued operations in 2015.
