= Maytown, Florida =

Maytown
- Unincorporated community
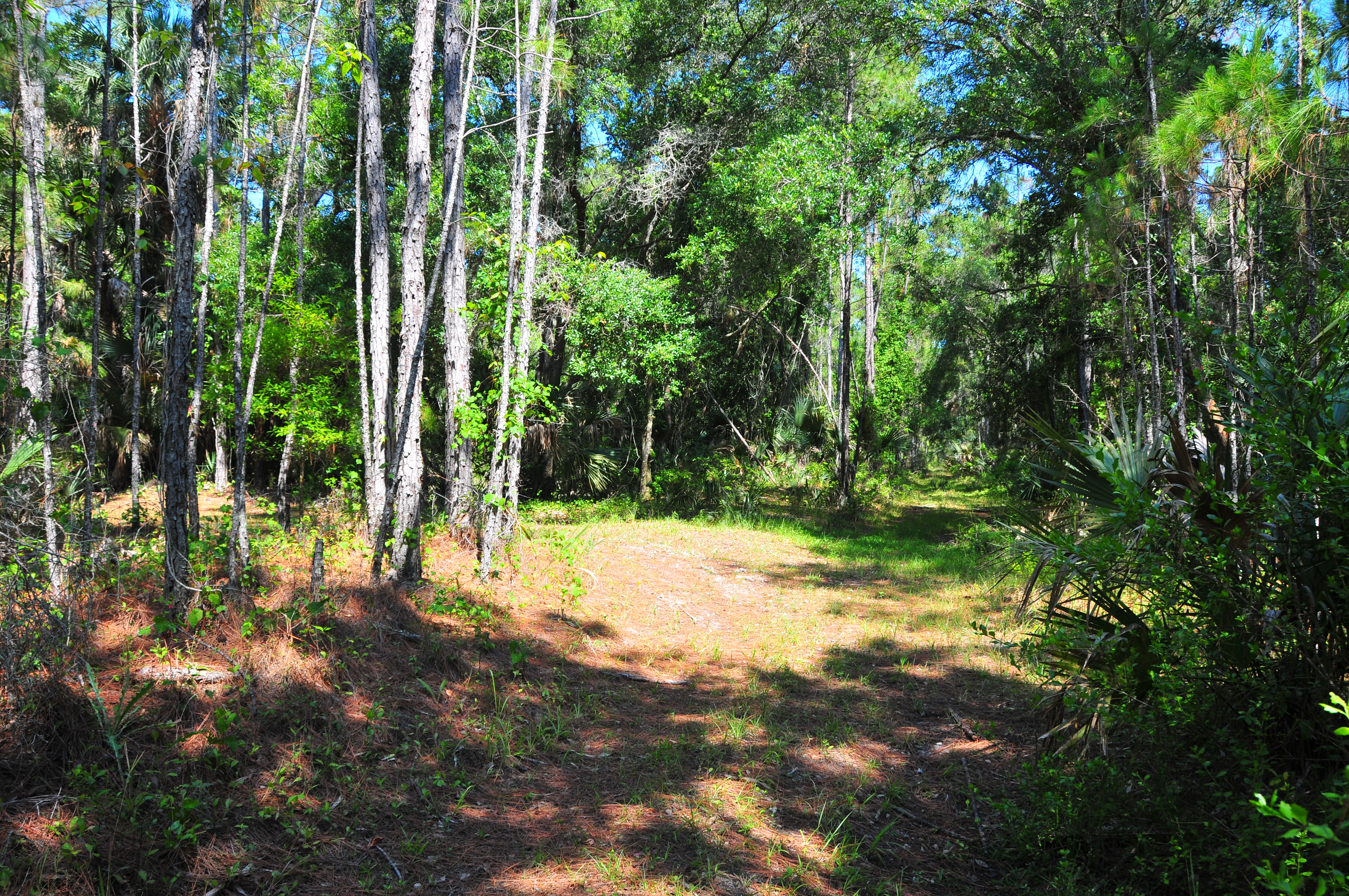
- The abandoned Florida East Coast Railway crossing in Maytown.

- Location within Volusia County
- Coordinates: 28°48′26″N 80°57′36″W
- Country: United States
- State: Florida
- County: Volusia
- Elevation: 30 ft (9 m)
- Time zone: UTC-5 (Eastern (EST))
  - Summer (DST): UTC-4 (EDT)
- enter ZIP code: 32141
- Area code: 386
- GNIS feature ID: 286559

Maytown is an unincorporated community located in south Volusia County, Florida, United States. The community was the site of the crossing of the Enterprise Branch and Kissimmee Valley Branch of the Florida East Coast Railway. Today, both lines are rail trails.
