= Kalamazoo, Florida =

Kalamazoo
- Unincorporated community
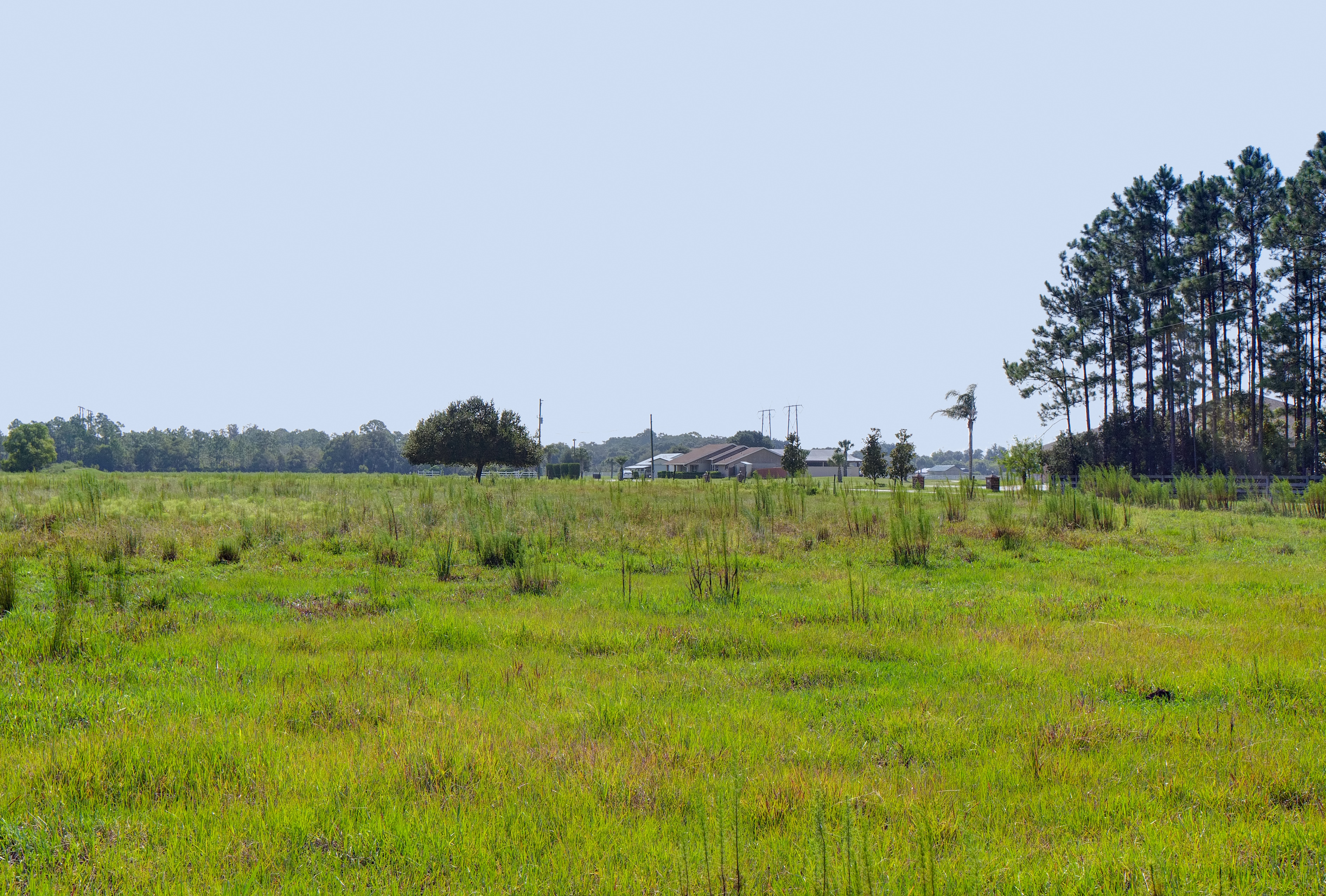
- Kalamazoo - The geographic center is on private property near the tree in center frame

- Location within Volusia County
- Coordinates: 28°50′46″N 081°06′36″W
- Country: United States
- State: Florida
- County: Volusia
- Elevation: 20 ft (6 m)
- Time zone: UTC-5 (Eastern (EST))
  - Summer (DST): UTC-4 (EDT)
- enter ZIP code: 32764
- Area code: 386
- GNIS feature ID: 294821

Kalamazoo is an unincorporated community located in southwest Volusia County, Florida. As of 2011, Kalamazoo is private property.

== History ==
According to longtime area residents, Kalamazoo was named for the many people who moved there from Michigan.

The name may also allude to celery farming in Kalamazoo, Michigan, for which that city was noted in the late 19th and early 20th centuries. In 1908, a company was capitalized with $25,000 to develop a celery farm on 10,000 acres in Kalamazoo, Florida, following on the success of celery farming in nearby Sanford. Its president was C. F. Walker of Savannah, Georgia.
