= Joe Knetsch =

American historian

Joseph "Joe" Knetsch is an American historian, educator, and author. In 2019, his book of essays about the history of Tallahassee, Florida and its surroundings was published.

== Life and career ==
Joseph Knetsch has a B.S. degree from Western Michigan University, a M.A. degree from Florida Atlantic University, and a Ph.D. from Florida State University.

He has taught at the secondary and collegiate levels, and worked as a historian for the Department of Environmental Protection and Department of Natural Resources.

Knetsch has written papers on the history of surveying and various aspects of Florida's history and landscape. He has written about Hamilton Disston. He has also written about Pembroke Pines and the Armed Occupation Act of 1842. He translated an 1856 letter from Smith Mowry to Jefferson Davis about Indian Key, Florida.

A 2004 H-Net review of his book on the Seminole Wars lauded the images, maps, and diagrams he included.

Knetsch lives in Tallassee, Florida with his wife Linda. The University of South Florida has a collection of his papers.

== Bibliography ==
- Knetsch, Joe (April 13, 1991). The Big Arredondo Grant: A Study in Confusion. Historical Society of Micanopy.
- Knetsch, Joe (July 17, 2006). Faces On The Frontier. The Florida Historical Society Press. ISBN 9781886104242.
- Knetsch, Joseph; Wynne, Nick (February 11, 2011). Florida in the Spanish-American War. Arcadia Publishing. ISBN 9781609490881.
- Wynne, Nick; Knetsch, Joe (November 20, 2012). Florida in the Great Depression, Desperation and Defiance. Arcadia Publishing. ISBN 9781609498061.
- Wynne, Nick; Knetsch, Joe (August 31, 2015). On This Day in Florida Civil War History. Arcadia Publishing. ISBN 9781467118170.
- Wynne, Nick; Knetsch, Joe (December 12, 2016). Utopian Communities of Florida: A History of Hope. Arcadia Publishing. ISBN 9781467136884.
- Wynne, Nick; Knetsch, Joe, eds. (October 11, 2017). Edge of Armageddon: Florida and the Cuban Missile Crisis. Outskirts Press. ISBN 9781478702474.
- Knetsch, Joe; Missall, John; Missall, Mary Lou (December 28, 2017). History of the Third Seminole War: 1849–1858. Casemate. ISBN 9781612005768.
- Wynne, Nick; Knetsch, Joe (April 21, 2022). Cousin Bob: The World War II Experiences of Robert Morris Warren. Outskirts Press, Incorporated. ISBN 9781977250278.
- Knetsch, Joe; Wynne, Nick; Redd, Robert (May 1, 2023). Florida at Sea: A Maritime History. Arcadia Publishing. ISBN 9781467154109.
