= Farmton, Florida =

Farmton
- Unincorporated community
- Location within Volusia County
- Coordinates: 28°50′49″N 81°03′38″W
- Country: United States
- State: Florida
- County: Volusia
- Elevation: 16 ft (5 m)
- Time zone: UTC-5 (Eastern (EST))
  - Summer (DST): UTC-4 (EDT)
- enter ZIP code: 32764
- Area code: 386
- GNIS feature ID: 294761

Farmton is an unincorporated community in Volusia County, Florida, United States, off Osteen–Maytown Road, eight miles west of Interstate 95. Farmton is located near the St. Johns River, west of Cow Creek and east of Osteen. The majority of the region is within a conservation area.
