= Runyon, Florida =

Housing area in Florida, US

Coordinates: 26.732°N 80.667°W

Runyon is a very small housing area with rental apartments (Alston Management, Inc). Runyon was previously owned by U.S. Sugar. It is located approximately a half mile north of Hooker highway, diagonally adjacent to Palm Beach County west area jail.

== Roads ==
- N Main St
- Livestock Market Rd.
- Church St.
- Bamboo St.
- Port Royal Ave.
- Orange Blossom Ln.
- St Elizabeth Ave.
- Pkwy Ave.
- Oak Ln.
- Runyon Village
- 441

== Churches ==
Straightway Church of Christ Written In Heaven

== Schools ==
No schools.
