= Osteen =

Osteen may refer to:

- Osteen (surname)
- Osteen, Florida, unincorporated community in the United States
- Osteen Bridge or Douglas Stenstrom Bridge, a steel-and-concrete bridge located in Indian Mound Village, Florida
- Osteen (mango), a commercial mango cultivar that originated on Merritt Island, Florida
