= Florida State Road 441 =

State highway in Florida, United States

State Road 441

Route information
- Maintained by FDOT
- Length: 5.409 mi (8.705 km)

Major junctions
- South end: SR A1A in Daytona Beach Shores / Port Orange
- North end: US 92 in Daytona Beach

Location
- Country: United States
- State: Florida
- Counties: Volusia

Highway system
- Florida State Highway System; Interstate; US; State; Former; Pre‑1945; Toll; Scenic
← US 441	→ SR 442

State Road 441 (SR 441) is a 5.4-mile-long (8.7 km) street in Port Orange, Daytona Beach Shores, and Daytona Beach. It is locally known as Peninsula Drive, and signed as a north–south road.

== Route description ==
The southern terminus is an intersection with SR A1A (Dunlawton Avenue/Boulevard) near the Port Orange Causeway in Port Orange (SR A1A continues northeastward one block from the intersection before turning onto South Atlantic Avenue and running parallel with SR 441); the northern terminus is an intersection with US 92-SR 600 in Daytona Beach near the northeastern approach to the Broadway Bridge.

An alternative to SR A1A, State Road 441 serves the Halifax River side of the barrier island between the Intracoastal Waterway and the Atlantic Ocean. In addition to the bridges near its termini, SR 441 also provides access (via Silver Beach Avenue, CR 4050) to Veterans Memorial Bridge in Daytona Beach. A northwestern continuation of Peninsula Drive permits access to the nearby Main Street Bridge and (via Seabreeze Boulevard, SR 430) Seabreeze Bridge, both also in Daytona Beach.

== Major intersections ==
The entire route is in Volusia County.

Location	mi	km	Destinations	Notes
Daytona Beach Shores–Port Orange line	0.000	0.000	SR A1A (Dunlawton Avenue)	
Daytona Beach	4.771	7.678	Silver Beach Avenue (CR 4050)	
Daytona Beach	5.409	8.705	US 92 (International Speedway Boulevard)	
1.000 mi = 1.609 km; 1.000 km = 0.621 mi
