= List of county roads in Volusia County, Florida =

- County road shields used in Florida

Highway names
- Interstates: Interstate X (I-X)
- US Highways: U.S. Highway X (US X)
- State: State Road X (SR X)
- County: County Road X (CR X)

System links
- County roads in Florida; County roads in Volusia County

Volusia County, Florida (located in central-east Florida), operates a system of county roads that serve all portions of the county. The Volusia County Public Works Department, Road and Bridge Division, is responsible for maintaining all of the Volusia County roads. Most of the county roads are city streets or rural roads. There are 1,563 miles (2,515 km) of county roads in Volusia County (though not all have been assigned numbers).

The numbers and routes of all Florida highways are assigned by the Florida Department of Transportation (FDOT), while county road numbers are assigned by the counties, with guidance from FDOT. North-south routes are generally assigned odd numbers, while east-west routes are generally assigned even numbers.

== List ==
Number	Length (mi)	Length (km)	Southern or western terminus	Northern or eastern terminus	Local names	Formed	Removed	Notes
CR A1A	—	—	New Smyrna Beach	Canaveral National Seashore	South Atlantic Avenue; Turtle Mound Road	—	—	Former SR A1A
CR 3	—	—	Brevard-Volusia County Line	US 1 (SR 5) at Canaveral National Seashore	Kennedy Parkway	—	—	Former SR 3; unsigned
CR 3	—	—	US 17 in DeLeon Springs	US 17 in Pierson		—	—	Former SR 3; inventoried as CR 2825 north of SR 40
CR 15A	—	—	US 17 (SR 15) / SR 15A	SR 11	North Spring Garden Avenue	—	—	Former SR 15A
CR 92	—	—	SR 15A at Glenwood Springs	US 17 / US 92 at North DeLand	International Speedway Boulevard	—	—	Part of a truck bypass for US 92
CR 201	—	—	CR 2002 in South Bulow	Volusia–Flagler county line	Walter Boardman Lane; John Anderson Highway	—	—	
CR 305	—	—	Willow Point Boat Ramp in Lake George	Volusia–Flagler county line east of Seville	Lake George Road; Bunnell Road	—	—	Former SR 305
CR 415	—	—	SR 44 in Samsula	CR 4068 in Daytona Beach	Tomoka Farms Road	—	—	Extension of SR 415
CR 421	—	—	CR 415	SR 442 & I-95 @ Exit 256	Taylor Road	—	—	Extension of SR 421
CR 430	—	—	CR 4009	SR 483 and CR 483	Mason Avenue	—	—	Extension of SR 430
CR 442	—	—	—	SR 442 & I-95 @ Exit 224	Elkcam Boulevard	—	—	Extension of SR 442
CR 483	—	—	Taylor Road in Port Orange	SR 400 in Daytona Beach	Clyde Morris Boulevard	—	—	Southern extension of SR 483
CR 483	—	—	SR 430 / CR 430 in Daytona Beach	SR 40 in Ormond Beach	Clyde Morris Boulevard	—	—	Northern extension of SR 483
CR 2001	—	—	CR 2002 east of I-95 at Exit 278	Volusia–Flagler county line	Old Kings Highway	—	—	Former SR 5A
CR 2002	—	—	SR A1A	Volusia–Flagler county line	Old Dixie Highway; Walter Boardman Lane; High Bridge Road	—	—	
CR 2802	—	—	CR 4001 and CR 2803 at Ormond-by-the-Sea	SR A1A at Ormond-by-the-Sea	Beau Rivage Drive	—	—	
CR 2803	—	—	CR 4001 and CR 2802 at Ormond-by-the-Sea	CR 2001 at Bulow Creek State Park	John Anderson Drive	—	—	
CR 2804	—	—	CR 4001 at Ormond-by-the-Sea	SR A1A at Ormond-by-the-Sea	Aqua Vista Drive	—	—	
CR 2806	—	—	CR 4001 at Ormond-by-the-Sea	SR A1A at Ormond-by-the-Sea	Palm Drive	—	—	
CR 2808	—	—	CR 4001 at Ormond-by-the-Sea	SR A1A at Ormond-by-the-Sea	Lynhurst Drive	—	—	
CR 2813	—	—	SR 40 at Ormond Beach	US 1 at Ormond Beach	Airport Road	—	—	Access Road to Ormond Beach Municipal Airport
CR 2817	—	—	CR 305	US 17		—	—	Seville area
CR 2820	—	—	US 1 at National Gardens	CR 4011 at Tomoka State Park	Pine Tree Drive	—	—	
CR 2831	—	—	US 17	CR 305	Little Brown Church Road; Cowart Avenue	—	—	Seville area
CR 2833	—	—	SR 40 in Volusia	US 17 in Eldridge	Emporia Road	—	—	Pierson area
CR 2851	—	—	CR 2817	US 17	Brownlee Road; Roulerson Road	—	—	
CR 4001	—	—	US 92 at Daytona Beach SR 40 in Ormond Beach	CR 4014/Riverside Drive at Ormond Beach CR 2802 and CR 2803 at Ormond-by-the-Sea	Halifax Avenue John Anderson Drive	—	—	
CR 4002	—	—	Riverside Drive in Ormond Beach	SR A1A at Ormond Beach	Ormond Parkway	—	—	
CR 4009	—	—	CR 4118 at Daytona Beach	SR 40 in Ormond Beach	Williamson Boulevard	—	—	Designated a "Scenic Thoroughfare" by City of Daytona Beach; proposed southern extension to SR 44
CR 4011	—	—	SR 430 at Daytona Beach	I-95 near Korona	Marco Polo Blvd; Old Dixie Highway	—	—	
CR 4013	—	—	—	—		—	—	
CR 4014	—	—	CR 4001 in Ormond Beach	SR A1A at Ormond Beach	Harvard Drive	—	—	
CR 4015	—	—	—	—	Derbyshire Road	—	—	
CR 4017	—	—	SR 483 / CR 483 at Daytona Beach	CR 4019 at Daytona Beach	Jimmy Ann Drive	—	—	Designated a "Scenic Thoroughfare" by City of Daytona Beach
CR 4019	—	—	US 92	CR 4011	LPGA Boulevard; 11th Street	—	—	
CR 4023	—	—	US 17	SR 40	Lake Winona Boulevard	—	—	
CR 4026	—	—	—	—	Eighth Street	—	—	
CR 4030	—	—	US 17 at DeLeon Springs	SR 11 in rural Volusia County	Spring Garden Ranch Road; Arredondo Grant Road	—	—	Passes DeLeon Springs Heights
CR 4034	—	—	US 17 north of DeLeon Springs	SR 11 in rural Volusia County	Blackwelder Road	—	—	Passes Lake Winona
CR 4040	—	—	SR 483 / CR 483 at Daytona Beach	SR A1A at Daytona Beach	George W. Engram Boulevard; Fairview Avenue; Main Street	—	—	Crosses Halifax River via Main Street Bridge
CR 4047	—	—	US 17 north of DeLand	SR 11	Marsh Road	—	—	East side of DeLand Municipal Airport
CR 4050	—	—	SR 5A at Daytona Beach	SR A1A at Daytona Beach	Orange Avenue; Silver Beach Avenue	—	—	Crosses Halifax River via Veterans Memorial Bridge
CR 4053	—	—	SR 44 north of DeLand Junction	US 17 north of DeLeon Springs	Grand Avenue; Retta Street	—	—	Former SR 40A; east side of Lake Woodruff NWR
CR 4068	—	—	CR 415 at Daytona Beach	SR 483 near Daytona Beach International Airport	Bellevue Avenue Extension	—	—	Previously had its western terminus at US 92 at Daytona Beach
CR 4072	—	—	CR 483	US 1	Big Tree Road	—	—	
CR 4075	—	—	Ponce de Leon Inlet	SR A1A at Daytona Beach Shores	South Atlantic Avenue	—	—	
CR 4078	—	—	CR 483 in Port Orange	US 1 in South Daytona	Reed Canal Road	—	—	
CR 4079	—	—	Ocean Avenue in Port Orange	US 1	Halifax Drive; Riverside Drive; Main Street	—	—	
CR 4088	—	—	CR 4053 in Glenwood	US 17 and SR 11 north of DeLand	Glenwood Road	—	—	
CR 4089	—	—	—	—		—	—	
CR 4093	—	—	CR 4011 at Port Orange	US 1 / SR A1A at New Smyrna Beach	Turnbull Bay Road	—	—	West of New Smyrna Beach Municipal Airport
CR 4101	—	—	CR 4145 in Orange City	US 92 near DeLand	North Kentucky Avenue	—	—	
CR 4110	—	—	CR 4125	SR 44	Old New York Avenue	—	—	Road to DeLand Junction
CR 4112	—	—	CR 4123 in West DeLand	CR 4105 in DeLand	Beresford Avenue	—	—	
CR 4116	—	—	Spring Garden Avenue west of Orange City	CR 4139 in Lake Helen	McGregor Road; Orange Camp Road; Main Street	—	—	
CR 4118	—	—	SR 44 in Longleaf Pine Preserve	SR 44 Bus. in New Smyrna Beach	Pioneer Trail	—	—	Former SR 40A
CR 4123	—	—	Dead End at Blue Spring State Park	SR 44 in West DeLand	South Ridgewood Avenue	—	—	
CR 4125	—	—	Dead End at Beresford Peninsula	CR 4110 at West DeLand	Hontoon Road	—	—	
CR 4133	—	—	—	—	Saxon Drive	—	—	
CR 4135	—	—	US 1 at Edgewater	—	Riverside Drive	—	—	
CR 4136	—	—	CR 4135	CR 4137 at Edgewater	West Park Avenue	—	—	
CR 4137	—	—	SR 442	SR 44	Old Mission Road	—	—	
CR 4139	—	—	CR 4101	SR 44	Cassadaga Road; Macy Avenue; Summit Avenue	—	—	Former SR 430A
CR 4142	—	—	Blue Springs State Park	US 17 / US 92 at Orange City	French Avenue	—	—	
CR 4143	—	—	—	—		—	—	
CR 4145	—	—	US 17 / US 92 at Orange City	SR 415 at Deltona	East Graves Avenue; Howland Boulevard	—	—	Former SR 430A west of CR 4101
CR 4146	—	—	US 17 / US 92	CR 4162	Saxon Boulevard	—	—	
CR 4147	—	—	CR 4164 at Oak Hill	US 1 at Nucomer	Volco Road; Beacon Light Road	—	—	
CR 4148	—	—	—	—	Newmark Drive	—	—	
CR 4152	—	—	—	—		—	—	
CR 4153	—	—	CR 5758	CR 4152		—	—	
CR 4154	—	—	—	—		—	—	
CR 4155	—	—	—	—		—	—	
CR 4156	—	—	US 17 / US 92 at Orange City	CR 4162 at Enterprise	Enterprise Road	—	—	
CR 4157	—	—	—	—		—	—	
CR 4158	—	—	—	—		—	—	
CR 4162	—	—	US 17 / US 92 at Benson Junction	SR 415 at Osteen	Dirksen Avenue; DeBary Avenue	—	—	
CR 4164	—	—	SR 415 at Osteen	US 1 at Oak Hill	Osteen–Maytown Road; Maytown Road; West Halifax Avenue	—	—	
CR 5758	—	—	CR 4162 at Enterprise	SR 415 at Osteen	Enterprise–Osteen Road	—	—	
