= Creighton, Florida =

Creighton
- unincorporated community
- Location within Volusia County
- Coordinates: 28°53′15″N 80°55′19″W
- Country: United States
- State: Florida
- County: Volusia
- Elevation: 30 ft (9 m)
- Time zone: UTC-5 (Eastern (EST))
  - Summer (DST): UTC-4 (EDT)
- enter ZIP code: 32141
- Area code: 386
- GNIS feature ID: 295226

Creighton is an unincorporated community in Volusia County, Florida, United States. It is situated on a former railroad station near the Farmton State Wildlife Management Area. Today, it is a rural community near Interstate 95. There are two roads that lead to Creighton; Volco Road and Cow Creek Road, accessible from either CR 4147 or SR 442.

== History ==
The community was named after E. R. Creighton, who owned a mill there in 1911.
