= Wilbur-By-The-Sea, Florida =

Unincorporated community in Florida, United States

- unincorporated community
- Interactive map of Wilbur-By-The-Sea, Florida
- Coordinates: 29°07′53″N 80°57′27″W
- Country: United States
- State: Florida
- County: Volusia County
- Elevation: 20 ft (6.1 m)
- Time zone: UTC-5 (Eastern (EST))
  - Summer (DST): UTC-4 (EDT)
- GNIS ID: 293276

Wilbur-By-The-Sea is an unincorporated community in Volusia County, Florida, United States. It is one of the two unincorporated areas in Volusia County along the coast that does not have a condominium or hotel (the other being Highbridge); instead, the area uses beachfront homes. Tom Wilbur Bay is a body of water that only has docks on the east side of the bay. The major roads of the area are State Road 441 and CR 4075; both roads border a body of water, Peninsula Drive on the west and South Atlantic Avenue on the east.

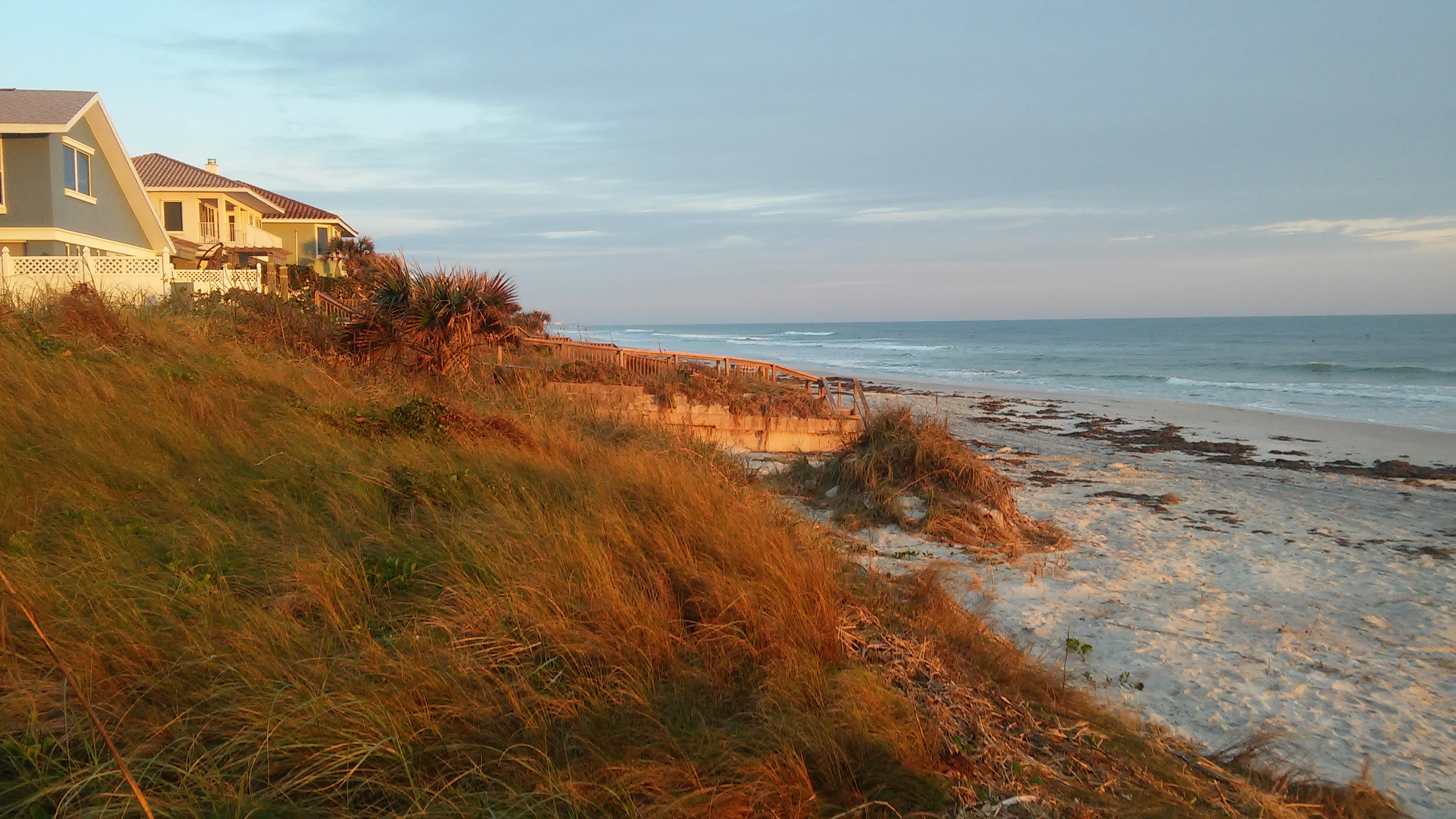
Beach scene

The community gained national attention after Hurricane Nicole in 2022 when many oceanfront homes collapsed into the ocean due to the erosion Hurricane Ian had caused weeks before.

== See also ==
- Halifax River
