= D Ranch Preserve =

Coordinates: 28°49′55″N 81°11′28″W

D Ranch Preserve is a nature preserve in Osteen, Volusia County, in the US state of Florida. It has trails for hiking and birdwatching. As of 2025, the park is open dawn to dusk.

Once part of a cattle ranch, the 476-acre (193-hectare) preserve is along Reed Ellis Road and Florida State Road 415. Habitats at the preserve include pine flatwoods, wetlands, and oak hammocks. Wildlife include Florida black bear, gopher tortoise, tree frogs, sandhill cranes and bald eagle. Plant species include longleaf pine and beautyberry.

The preserve is operated by Conservation Florida, a private conservation trust. The land was protected as a preserve in 2019, and opened to the public in the spring of 2025. In September of the same year, plans for a $2.5 million nature center on the property were announced.
