= Douglas Stenstrom =

Florida politician

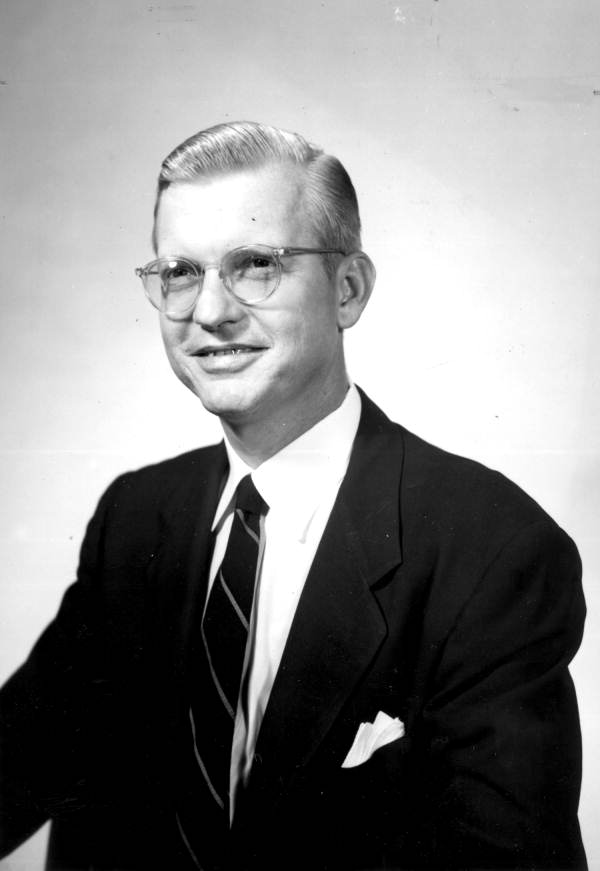
- Stenstrom in 1959

Member of the Florida Senate from the 37th district
- In office 1955–1960

Personal details
- Born: September 5, 1921 Sanford, Florida, U.S.
- Died: June 23, 2010 (aged 88)
- Party: Democratic
- Education: University of Florida

Douglas Stenstrom (September 5, 1921 – June 23, 2010) was an American politician and lawyer.

Born in Sanford, Florida, Stenstrom graduated from University of Florida. He then served in the United States Army with the Chemical Corps during World War II in the Pacific. After the war, Stenstrom graduated from Stetson College of Law and was admitted to the Florida bar. Stenstrom served as a Florida county court judge and then served in the Florida State Senate from 1955 to 1960. The Douglas Stenstrom Bridge commonly known as the Osteen Bridge was named after him. An elementary school in Oviedo, Florida, was named Douglas Stenstrom Elementary School.
