= Seville, Florida =

- CDP
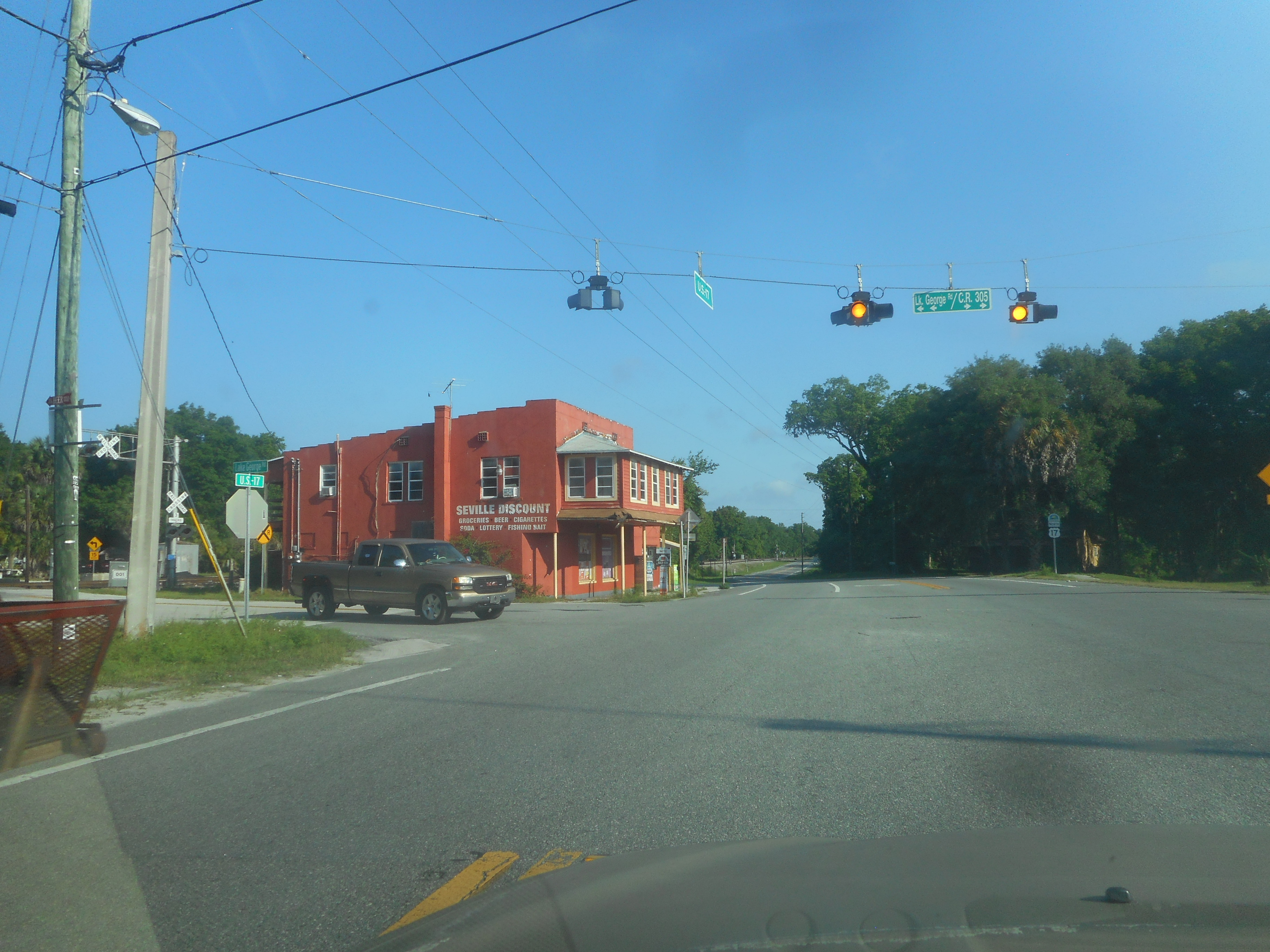
- The Seville Discount Store on US 17 and Lake George Road in Seville.

- Map of Seville in Volusia County, Florida
- Coordinates: 29°20′07″N 81°29′52″W
- Country: United States
- State: Florida
- County: Volusia
- Elevation: 33 ft (10 m)
- Time zone: UTC-5 (Eastern (EST))
  - Summer (DST): UTC-4 (EDT)
- ZIP code: 32190
- Area code: 386
- FIPS code: 12-65200
- GNIS ID: 2583381

Seville is an unincorporated community and census-designated place in Volusia County, Florida, United States, founded in 1882. As of the 2020 census, Seville had a population of 580.

== History ==
William Kemble Lente, a vice president of the Jacksonville, Tampa and Key West Railway, founded the town of Seville in 1882 along the railroad right of way. Taking advantage of the location, he set about to build a community. He founded the Bank of Seville and built a large brick residence for himself. Teaming up with some northern investors, they started work on a grand hotel. Next the group built a complex water system costing $60,000. The relationship between Lente and his backers became strained and then bitter, and Lente killed himself at his Seville home in 1889. Today with limited commercial development and a largely rural/agricultural base, Seville is a quiet community just north of Pierson along U.S. Route 17.

== Demographics ==
Historical population
Census	Pop.	Note	%±
2010	614		—
2020	580		−5.5%

Seville first appeared as a census designated place in the 2010 U.S. census.
