= Florida State Road 483 =

State highway in Florida, United States

State Road 483
- SR 483 in red, CR 483 in blue

Route information
- Maintained by FDOT
- Length: 3.377 mi (5.435 km)

Major junctions
- South end: SR 400 / CR 483 in Daytona Beach
- US 92 in Daytona Beach
- North end: SR 430 / CR 430 / CR 483 in Daytona Beach

Location
- Country: United States
- State: Florida
- Counties: Volusia

Highway system
- Florida State Highway System; Interstate; US; State; Former; Pre‑1945; Toll; Scenic
← SR 482	→ SR 492

State Road 483 (SR 483) is a north–south route in Daytona Beach, consisting of a section of Clyde Morris Boulevard between and State Road 400 (Beville Road) and State Road 430 (Mason Avenue). The remainder of the road, north from SR 400 to State Road 40 and south through State Road 421 into Taylor Road is County Road 483 (CR 483).

At the vicinity of the Embry-Riddle Aeronautical University, an elaborate pedestrian bridge crosses over the road.

== Major intersections ==
The entire route is in Daytona Beach, Volusia County.

mi	km	Destinations	Notes
0.000	0.000	SR 400 (Beville Road)	
2.179	3.507	US 92 (West International Speedway Boulevard / SR 600) – Daytona State College, Airport	
3.377	5.435	SR 430 east / CR 430 west (Mason Avenue)	
1.000 mi = 1.609 km; 1.000 km = 0.621 mi
