= Alamana, Florida =

Alamana
- Unincorporated community
- Location within Volusia County
- Coordinates: 28°56′35″N 81°06′09″W
- Country: United States
- State: Florida
- County: Volusia
- Settled: 1910
- Elevation: 33 ft (10 m)
- Time zone: UTC-5 (Eastern (EST))
  - Summer (DST): UTC-4 (EDT)
- enter ZIP code: 32168
- Area code: 386
- GNIS feature ID: 294647

Alamana is an unincorporated community located in central Volusia County, Florida, United States, east of Deltona just north of Lake Ashby off SR 415. The community was established in 1910 and named for a settler, J.A. Alaman.

In 1915, the community had a post office and a general store.
