= Indian Mound Village, Florida =

Indian Mound Village
- Unincorporated community
- Location within Seminole County, Florida
- Coordinates: 28°48′12″N 81°13′00″W
- Country: United States
- State: Florida
- County: Seminole
- Elevation: 13 ft (4.0 m)
- Time zone: UTC-5 (Eastern (EST))
  - Summer (DST): UTC-4 (EDT)
- Area codes: 407, 689 & 321
- GNIS feature ID: 284523

Indian Mound Village is an unincorporated community in Seminole County, Florida, United States, located on the St. Johns River. It is also where the Osteen Bridge is.

The community takes its name from a nearby Indian burial mound, likely Timucuan. However, the namesake burial mounds have not been left intact, minimizing the archeological value.

== History ==
The area was originally subdivided into 116 lots in 1926 by the Davey-Winston Organization Inc. of Sanford, Florida.

The county approved construction of a water distribution system to the community in 1967.
