= Osteen, Florida =

Osteen
- Unincorporated community
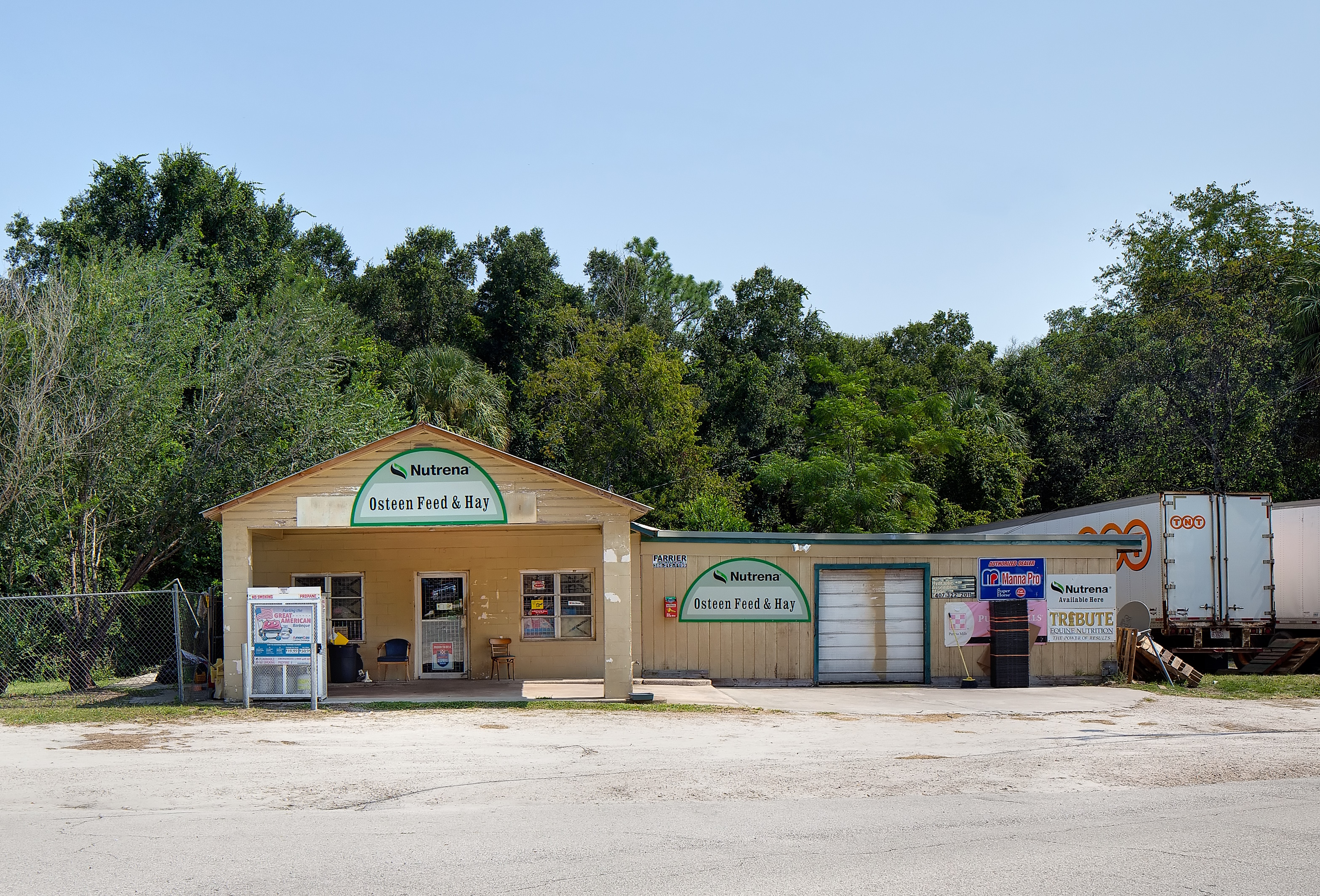
- Feed & Hay Store in Osteen

- Location in Volusia County and the state of Florida
- Coordinates: 28°50′46″N 81°09′45″W
- Country: United States
- State: Florida
- County: Volusia
- Elevation: 46 ft (14 m)
- Time zone: UTC-5 (EST)
  - Summer (DST): UTC-4 (EDT)
- ZIP code(s): 32764
- Area codes: 407, 689
- GNIS feature ID: 288269

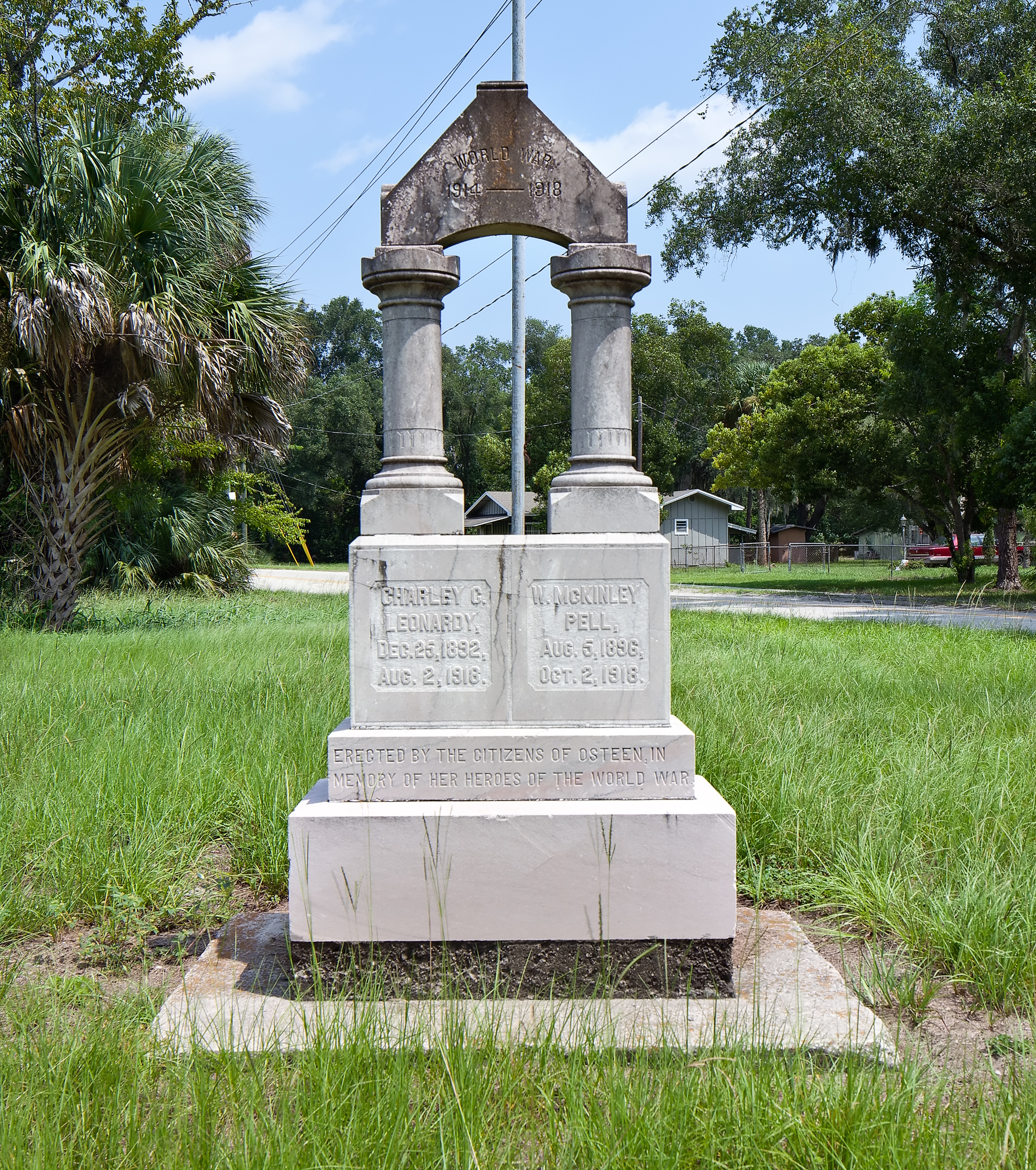
World War I Memorial in Osteen

Osteen is an unincorporated community in southwest Volusia County, Florida, United States. Osteen is near the St. Johns River as well as typical swamps, forests and wildlife of Florida. Osteen attracts a number of visitors for these qualities. There are numerous camping areas and preserves such as the Hickory Bluff Preserve, a 150-acre nature preserve with hiking and horse trails.

The Osteen Bridge spans the St. Johns River near State Road 46 to the south near the Orlando Sanford International Airport. Sanford and Lake Monroe border the community to the west, with Deltona to the north and the small community of Farmton to the east.

The north-south route of mostly two-lane State Road 415 serves as the main artery through Osteen. It connects State Road 44 in Volusia County to State Road 46 in Seminole County. State Road 415 is a two-lane road from State Road 44 until just north of Osteen. The road was recently four-laned beginning approximately three-miles north of Osteen and running the distance to State Road 46.

== History ==
Osteen was named after Hezekiah Ellis Osteen (1821–1904) a cattle rancher, who with his wife, Susannah Gaskins Osteen (1826–?), originally settled in the community in the 19th century. Prior to Osteen, the community was known as Saulsville. A member of the Osteen family fought for the Confederacy in the American Civil War, and was either wounded or killed in battle. A plaque is dedicated to the founders of the city in the civic center that was built in 1968. The city was once incorporated and the abandoned city hall is located on the corner of Railroad Avenue just west of the post office. Also located within Osteen is the Cypress Point Golf Club, a nine-hole executive length golf course.

In May 2025, Conservation Florida reopened the former D Ranch cattle ranch as D Ranch Preserve, a nature preserve of nearly 500 acres. In September of the same year, plans for a $2.5 million nature center on the property were announced.
