= Daytona Beach Shores, Florida =

- City
- City of Daytona Beach Shores
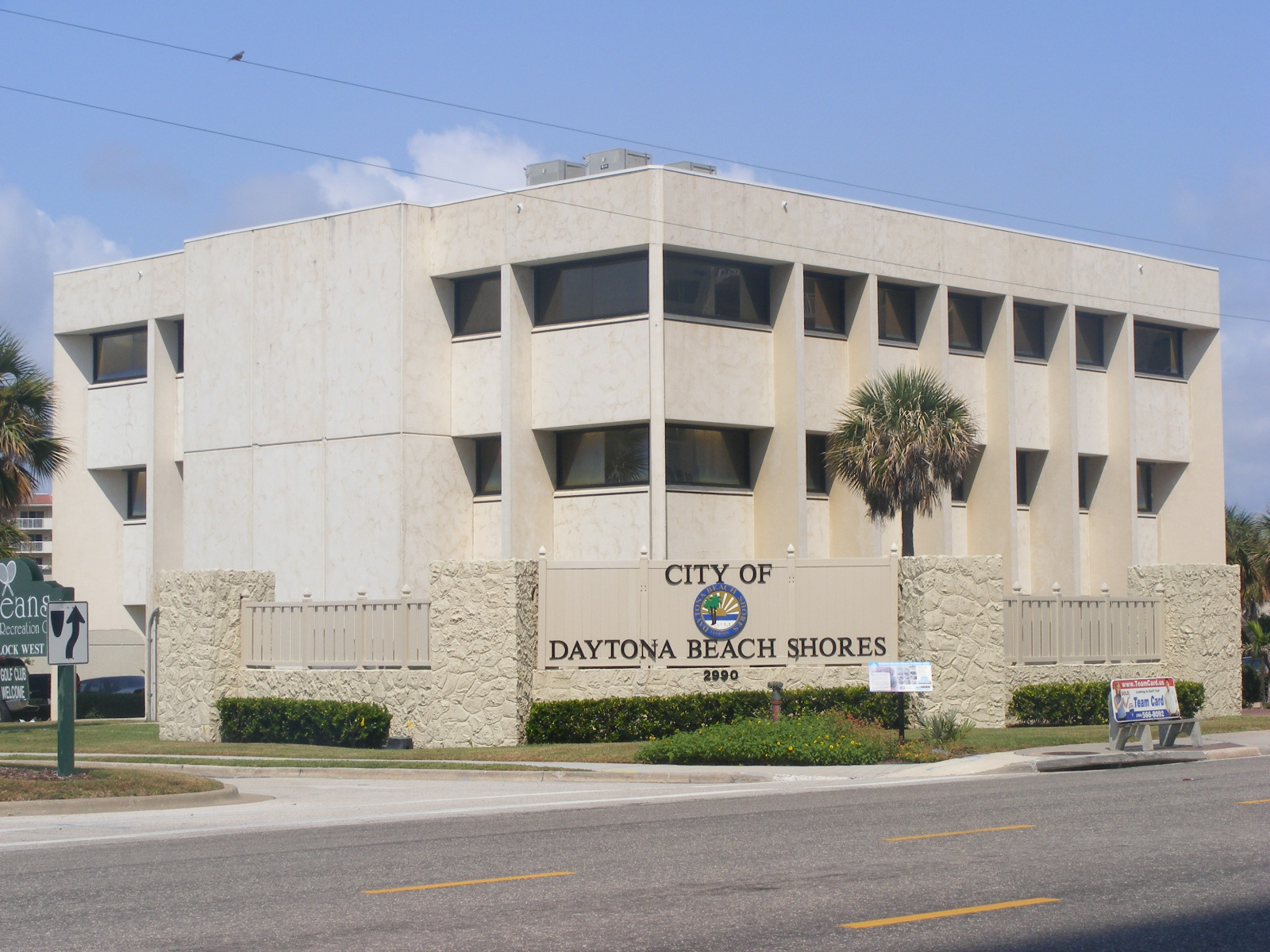
- Daytona Beach Shores City Hall

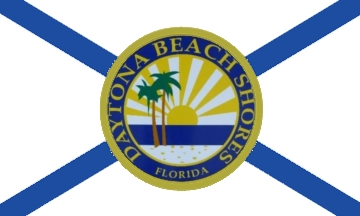
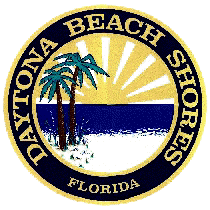
- Flag Seal
- Motto: "Life is Better Here"
- Location in Volusia County and the state of Florida
- Coordinates: 29°10′14″N 80°58′49″W
- Country: United States
- State: Florida
- County: Volusia
- Incorporated: April 22, 1960

Government
  - Type: Commission-Manager

Area
  - Total: 0.88 sq mi (2.28 km^{2})
  - Land: 0.85 sq mi (2.20 km^{2})
  - Water: 0.031 sq mi (0.08 km^{2}) 3.56%
- Elevation: 16 ft (4.9 m)

Population (2020)
  - Total: 5,179
  - Density: 6,092.3/sq mi (2,352.26/km^{2})
- Time zone: UTC-5 (Eastern (EST))
  - Summer (DST): UTC-4 (EDT)
- ZIP code: 32118
- Area code: 386
- FIPS code: 12-16550
- GNIS feature ID: 2404198
- Website: http://www.dbshores.org/

Daytona Beach Shores is a city in Volusia County, Florida, United States. The population was 5,179 at the 2020 census.

== History ==
Daytona Beach Shores was first organized in 1960 by local business leaders convinced that a smaller community could provide better services to its residents. The city was incorporated on April 22, 1960.

In the 1970s and the 1980s, the city saw a massive building program. Now about 80 percent of the residents live in high-rise condominiums that stretch along the Atlantic Ocean.

A resort and retirement community built on tourism and the service industry, Daytona Beach Shores has no manufacturing industry, but caters to tourists year-round with miniature golf courses and other types of family entertainment.

== Geography ==
According to the United States Census Bureau, the city has a total area of 0.90 square miles (2.34 km^{2}), of which 0.90 square miles (2.33 km^{2}) is land and 0.039 square miles (0.1 km^{2}) (3.56%) is water.

The city of Daytona Beach Shores is located on a barrier island along the Atlantic Ocean. The other side of the island (the west side) is bordered by the Halifax River lagoon, part of the Intracoastal Waterway. The city is bordered on the north by Daytona Beach and on the south by Wilbur-by-the-Sea, and Port Orange. The major highway that serves the city is State Road A1A (Atlantic Avenue).

Daytona Beach Shores has a humid subtropical climate (Cfa), typical for a city in the southeastern United States. Summers are hot and humid, with highs usually in the 90s (Fahrenheit) and a heat index often exceeding 100 degrees °F. Thunderstorms are frequent in summer afternoons, and the hot, humid weather can last right through the fall months. Winters are dry and mild, marked by a constant series of cold fronts and warm-ups. Temperatures dip into the low 30s°F and upper 20s°F on occasion, and freezes are not uncommon. Frost usually occurs a few times a year, but snowfall is very rare. The last time snow flurries fell on the city of Daytona Beach Shores was in December 2007. Temperatures in spring feature warm afternoons, cool evenings, and far less humidity. This beach-going weather attracts tourists to the beaches, usually by early March.

== Demographics ==
Historical population
Census	Pop.	Note	%±
1970	768		—
1980	1,324		72.4%
1990	2,335		76.4%
2000	4,299		84.1%
2010	4,247		−1.2%
2020	5,179		21.9%
U.S. Decennial Census

=== Racial and ethnic composition ===
Daytona Beach Shores racial composition (Hispanics excluded from racial categories) (NH = Non-Hispanic)
Race	Pop 2010	Pop 2020	% 2010	% 2020
White (NH)	3,935	4,539	92.65%	87.64%
Black or African American (NH)	33	100	0.78%	1.93%
Native American or Alaska Native (NH)	9	4	0.21%	0.08%
Asian (NH)	91	115	2.14%	2.22%
Pacific Islander or Native Hawaiian (NH)	6	1	0.14%	0.02%
Some other race (NH)	3	22	0.07%	0.42%
Two or more races/Multiracial (NH)	61	153	1.44%	2.95%
Hispanic or Latino (any race)	109	245	2.57%	4.73%
Total	4,247	5,179		

=== 2020 census ===
As of the 2020 census, Daytona Beach Shores had a population of 5,179. The median age was 67.4 years. 4.3% of residents were under the age of 18 and 56.0% of residents were 65 years of age or older. For every 100 females there were 88.7 males, and for every 100 females age 18 and over there were 88.8 males age 18 and over.

100.0% of residents lived in urban areas, while 0.0% lived in rural areas.

There were 3,012 households in Daytona Beach Shores, of which 6.1% had children under the age of 18 living in them. Of all households, 44.6% were married-couple households, 21.3% were households with a male householder and no spouse or partner present, and 29.0% were households with a female householder and no spouse or partner present. About 41.2% of all households were made up of individuals and 27.0% had someone living alone who was 65 years of age or older.

There were 6,329 housing units, of which 52.4% were vacant. The homeowner vacancy rate was 2.6% and the rental vacancy rate was 21.3%.

According to the 2020 ACS 5-year estimates, there were 1,134 families residing in the city.

=== 2010 census ===
As of the 2010 United States census, there were 4,247 people, 2,404 households, and 1,226 families residing in the city.

=== 2000 census ===
As of the census of 2000, there were 4,299 people, 2,423 households, and 1,439 families residing in the city. The population density was 4,722.2 inhabitants per square mile (1,823.3/km^{2}). There were 4,385 housing units at an average density of 4,816.6 units per square mile (1,859.7 units/km^{2}). The racial makeup of the city was 96.58% White, 0.58% African American, 0.16% Native American, 1.72% Asian, 0.12% Pacific Islander, 0.14% from other races, and 0.70% from two or more races. Hispanic or Latino of any race were 1.07% of the population.

In 2000, there were 2,423 households, out of which 4.1% had children under the age of 18 living with them, 54.5% were married couples living together, 3.6% had a female householder with no husband present, and 40.6% were non-families. 35.2% of all households were made up of individuals, and 19.7% had someone living alone who was 65 years of age or older. The average household size was 1.77 and the average family size was 2.18.

In 2000, in the city, the population was spread out, with 4.3% under the age of 18, 2.4% from 18 to 24, 11.5% from 25 to 44, 32.6% from 45 to 64, and 49.2% who were 65 years of age or older. The median age was 65 years. For every 100 females, there were 90.1 males. For every 100 females age 18 and over, there were 89.5 males.

In 2000, the median income for a household in the city was $43,796, and the median income for a family was $52,731. Males had a median income of $39,118 versus $24,826 for females. The per capita income for the city was $37,010. About 5.4% of families and 6.8% of the population were below the poverty line, including 6.8% of those under age 18 and 6.0% of those age 65 or over.

== Law and government ==
Daytona Beach Shores features a City Manager/Commission form of government. Residents elect a five-member City Commission to four-year terms. The Commission members are elected at large and represent the entire community. The Mayor is also elected, and serves as one of the five Commission members and as chairman of the commission. The City Manager is selected by the Commission members and is the city's chief administrator. That individual directs staff, carries out policies set by Commission, and provides advice to the Commission members, but does not vote. Daytona Beach Shores utilizes a department of public safety, which combines police and fire services into one department.

Mayor - Stephan Dembinsky

Vice Mayor - Chris Conomos

Commissioner - Mark Card

Commissioner - Vincent Donvito

Commissioner - Michael Politis

=== Federal, state and county representation ===
Daytona Beach Shores is in the 7th Congressional District. The residents of the 6th district are represented in the United States House of Representatives by Republican Cory Mills.

Daytona Beach Shores is part of Florida Senate District 8, and is represented by Republican Tom Wright. It is also part of Florida House of Representatives District 28, represented by Republican Tom Leek.

=== Public safety ===
Daytona Beach Shores has a public safety department which is responsible for combined fire-rescue as well as law enforcement. All full-time officers are certified as firefighters, EMTs, and police.

== Notable people ==
- Duane Allman, musician
- Gregg Allman, musician

== Parks and recreation ==
- Dahlia Park
- Fornari Park
- Max Samuely Park
- McElroy Park
- Frank Rendon Park
- Sundown Park
- Sunglow Pier

== Images ==
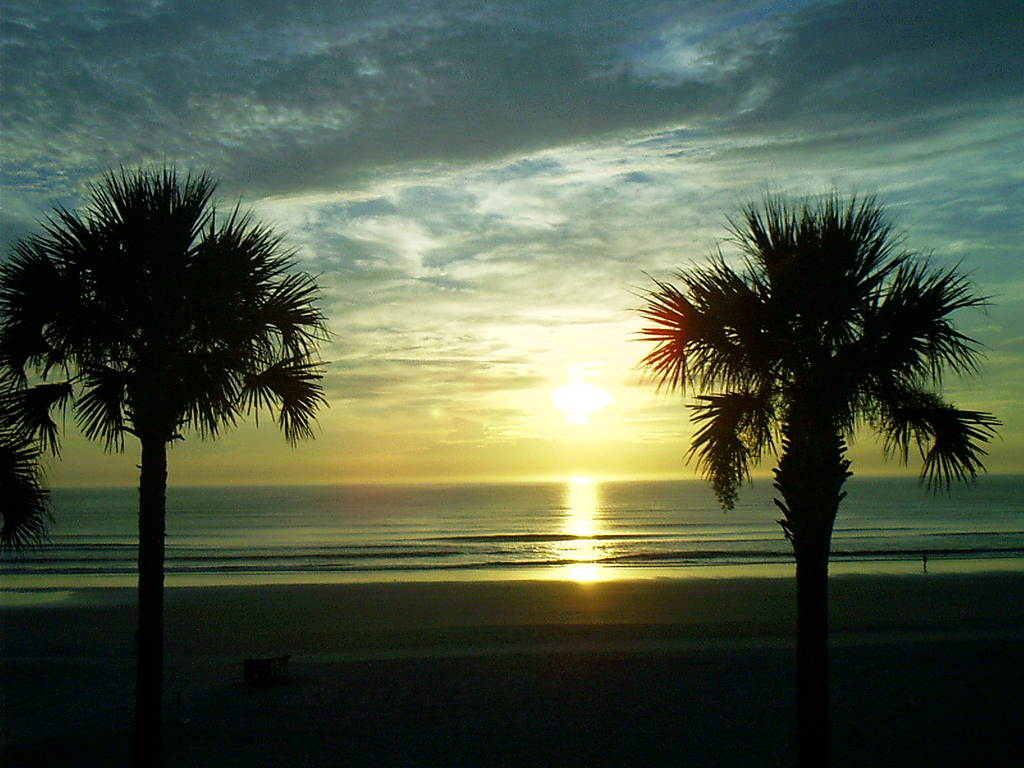
Sunrise at Daytona Beach Shores

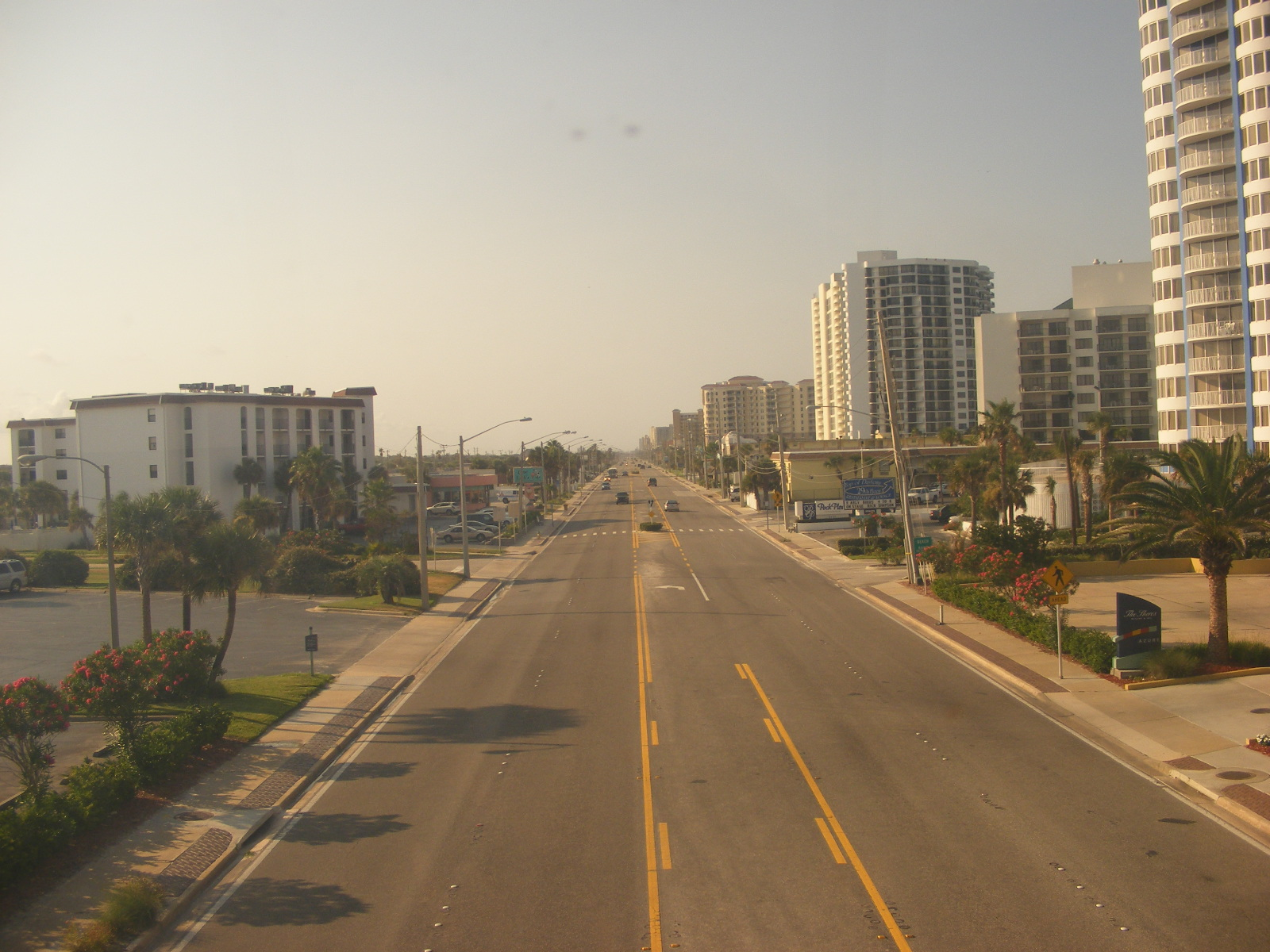
Atlantic Avenue (Florida Highway A1A)

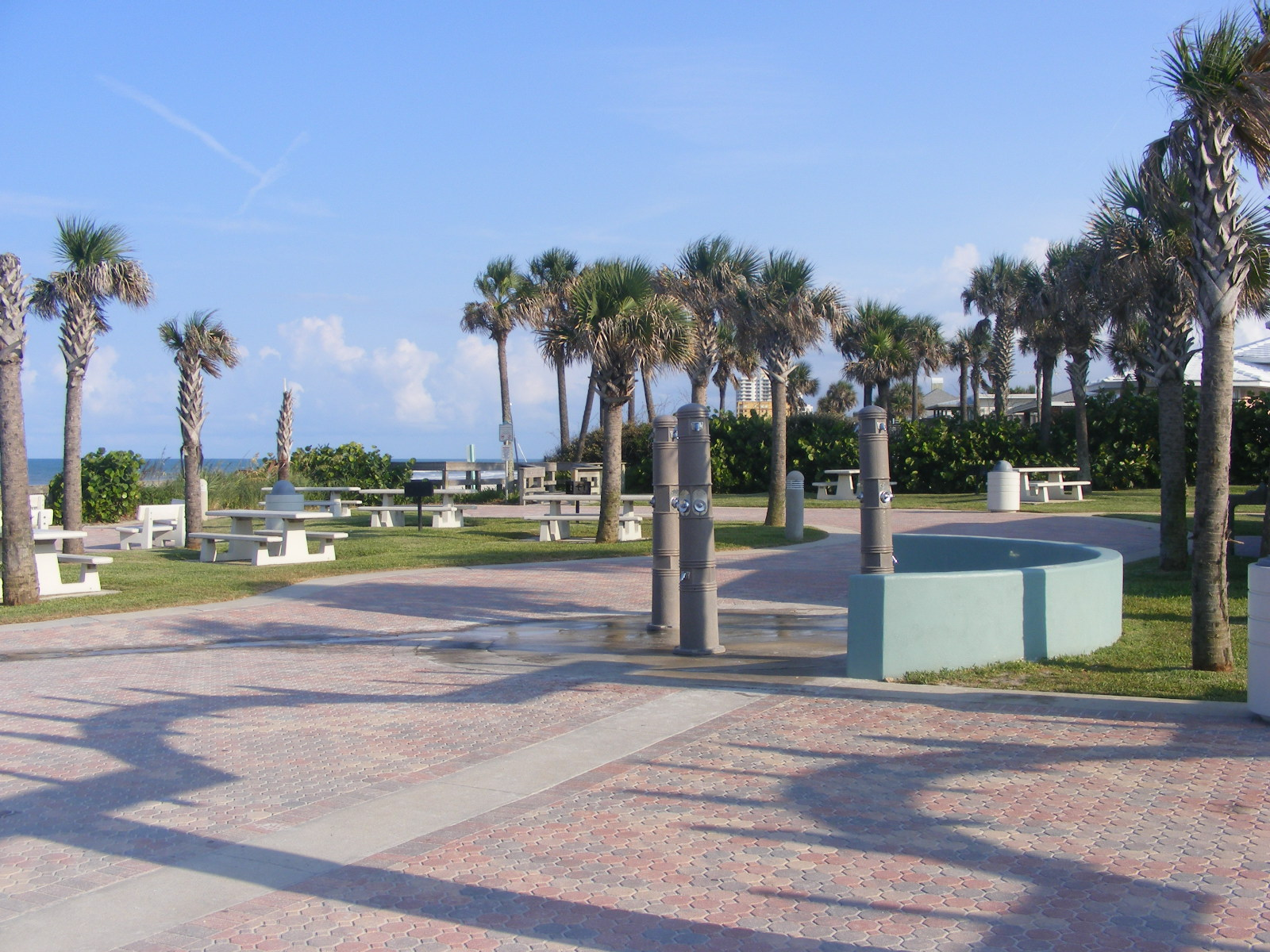
Frank Rendon Park

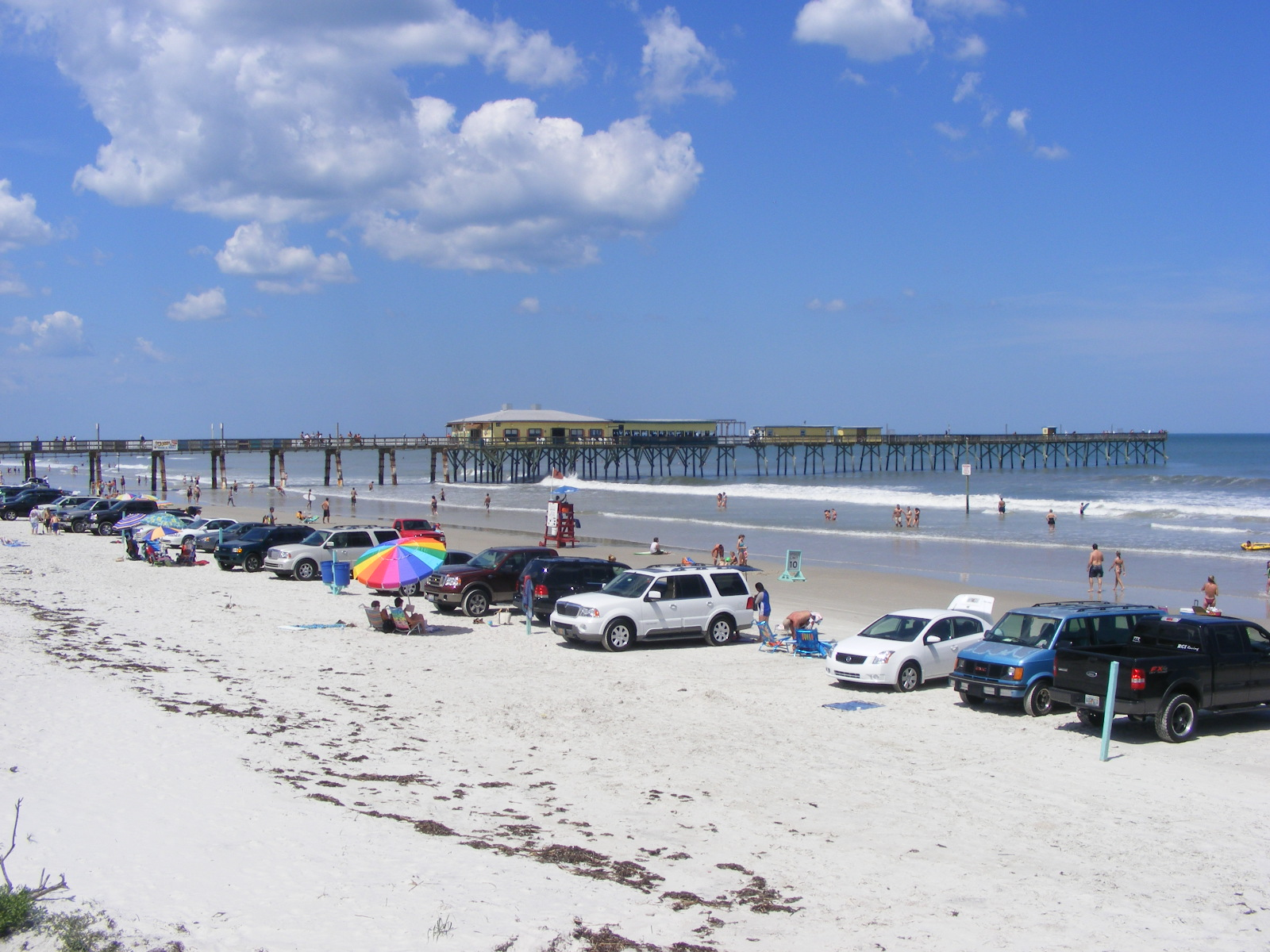
The Sunglow Pier in Daytona Beach Shores

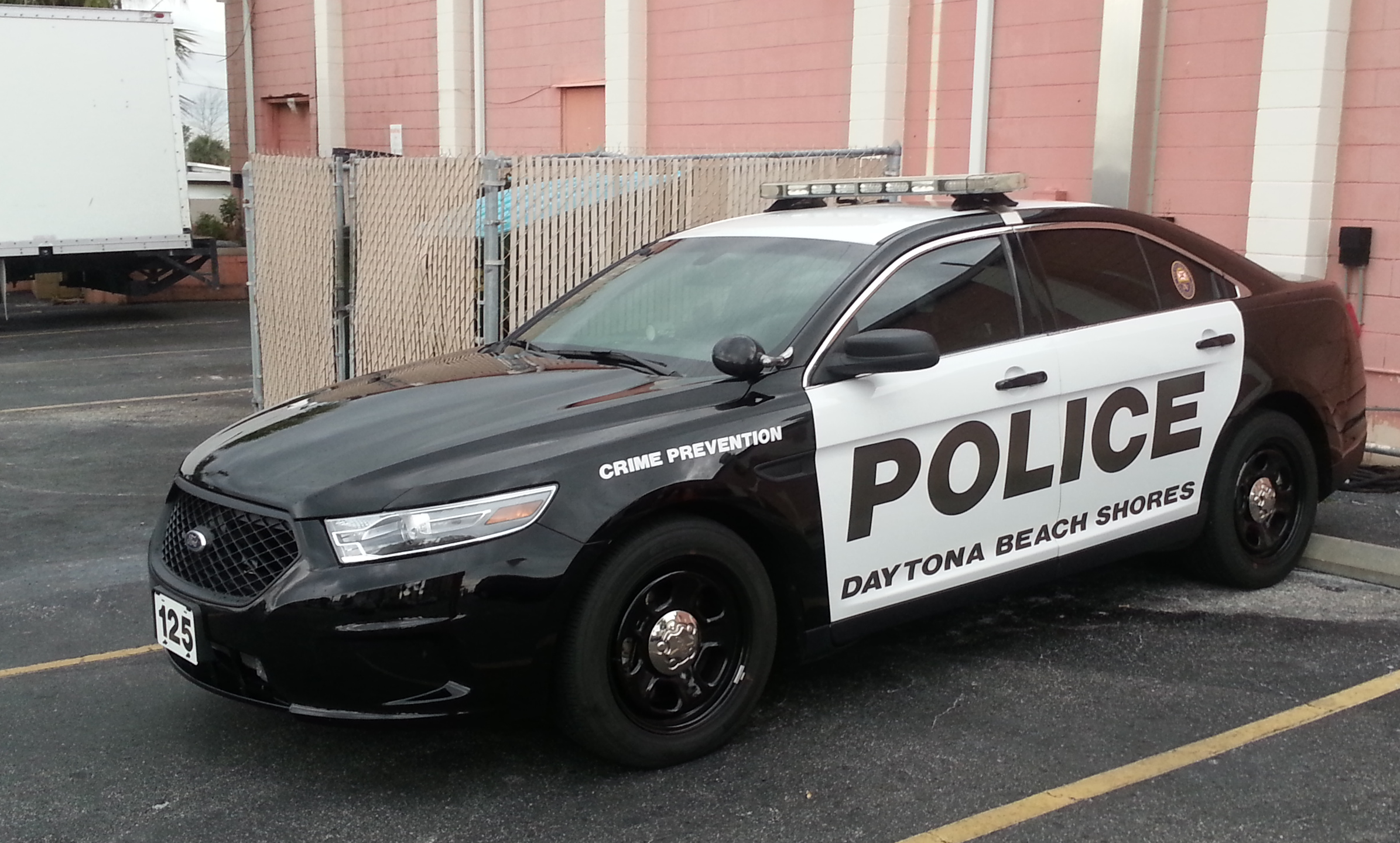
Daytona Beach Shores Police Car

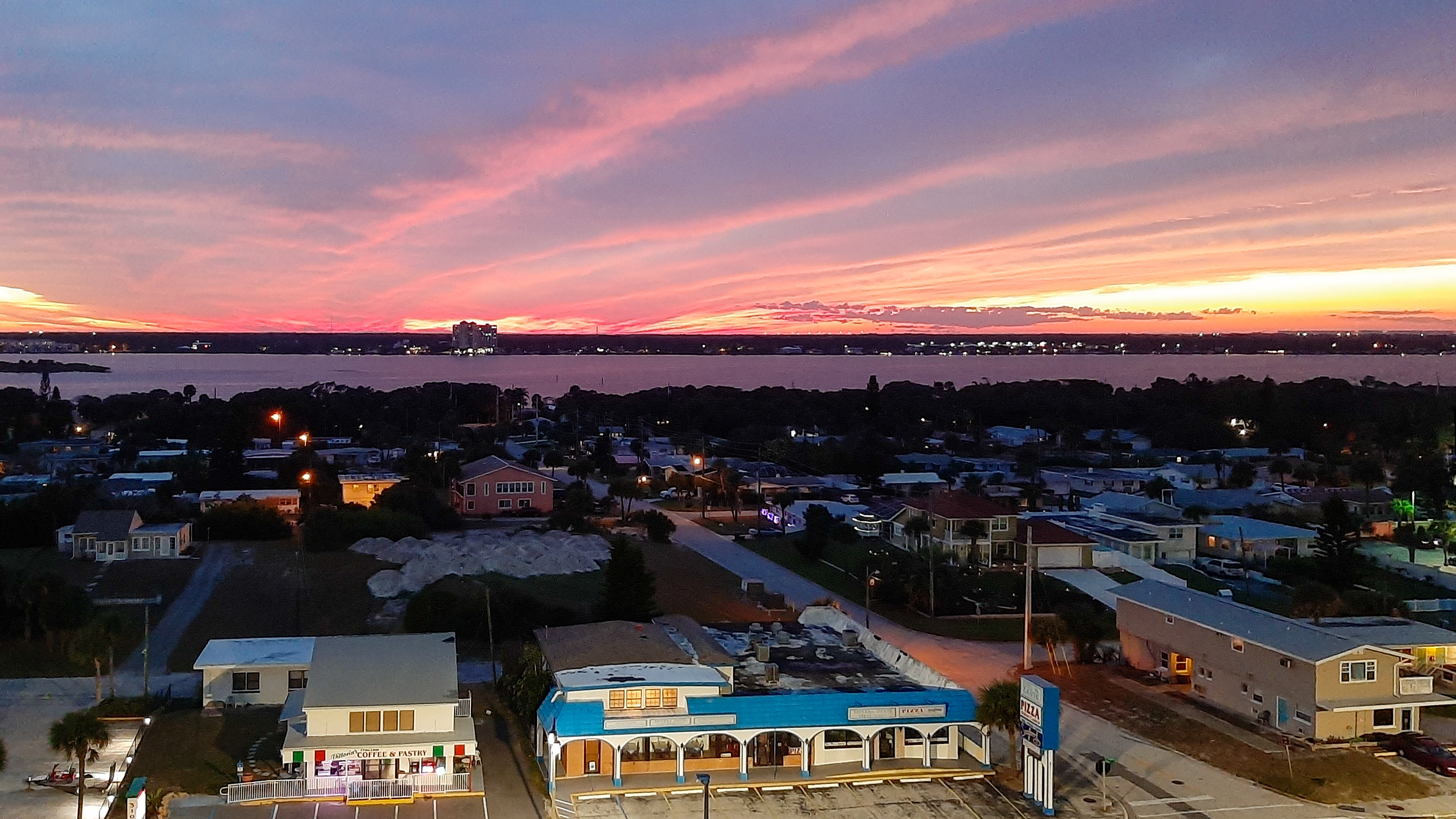
Sunset in Daytona Beach Shores as viewed from across South Atlantic Avenue
