= West DeLand, Florida =

- CDP
- Location in Volusia County and the state of Florida
- Coordinates: 29°00′58″N 81°20′04″W
- Country: United States
- State: Florida
- County: Volusia

Area
  - Total: 2.15 sq mi (5.57 km^{2})
  - Land: 2.15 sq mi (5.57 km^{2})
  - Water: 0 sq mi (0.00 km^{2})
- Elevation: 52 ft (16 m)

Population (2020)
  - Total: 3,908
  - Density: 1,818.0/sq mi (701.93/km^{2})
- Time zone: UTC-5 (Eastern (EST))
  - Summer (DST): UTC-4 (EDT)
- ZIP code: 32720
- Area code: 386
- FIPS code: 12-76087
- GNIS feature ID: 2403001

West DeLand, also spelled West De Land, is a census-designated place (CDP) in Volusia County, Florida, United States. The population was 3,908 at the 2020 census.

== Geography ==
According to the United States Census Bureau, the CDP has a total area of 2.4 square miles (6.1 km^{2}), all land.

== Demographics ==
Historical population
Census	Pop.	Note	%±
2020	3,908		—
U.S. Decennial Census

=== 2020 census ===
As of the 2020 census, West DeLand had a population of 3,908. The median age was 41.2 years. 22.2% of residents were under the age of 18 and 18.9% of residents were 65 years of age or older. For every 100 females there were 89.1 males, and for every 100 females age 18 and over there were 86.6 males age 18 and over.

97.8% of residents lived in urban areas, while 2.2% lived in rural areas.

There were 1,481 households in West DeLand, of which 30.3% had children under the age of 18 living in them. Of all households, 47.7% were married-couple households, 17.6% were households with a male householder and no spouse or partner present, and 25.6% were households with a female householder and no spouse or partner present. About 23.8% of all households were made up of individuals and 10.6% had someone living alone who was 65 years of age or older.

There were 1,568 housing units, of which 5.5% were vacant. The homeowner vacancy rate was 1.6% and the rental vacancy rate was 6.7%.

Racial composition as of the 2020 census
Race	Number	Percent
White	2,876	73.6%
Black or African American	272	7.0%
American Indian and Alaska Native	28	0.7%
Asian	43	1.1%
Native Hawaiian and Other Pacific Islander	2	0.1%
Some other race	164	4.2%
Two or more races	523	13.4%
Hispanic or Latino (of any race)	655	16.8%

=== 2000 census ===
As of the census of 2000, there were 3,424 people, 1,283 households, and 934 families residing in the CDP. The population density was 565.0/km^{2} (1,465.0/mi^{2}). There were 1,342 housing units at an average density of 221.4/km^{2} (574.2/mi^{2}). The racial makeup of the CDP was 88.70% White, 6.57% African American, 0.20% Native American, 0.55% Asian, 2.63% from other races, and 1.34% from two or more races. Hispanic or Latino of any race were 6.45% of the population.

There were 1,283 households, out of which 32.4% had children under the age of 18 living with them, 55.1% were married couples living together, 12.5% had a female householder with no husband present, and 27.2% were non-families. 22.0% of all households were made up of individuals, and 10.1% had someone living alone who was 65 years of age or older. The average household size was 2.65 and the average family size was 3.05.

In the CDP, the population was spread out, with 25.3% under the age of 18, 7.4% from 18 to 24, 28.0% from 25 to 44, 24.4% from 45 to 64, and 14.9% who were 65 years of age or older. The median age was 38 years. For every 100 females, there were 97.9 males. For every 100 females age 18 and over, there were 93.0 males.

The median income for a household in the CDP was $36,832, and the median income for a family was $40,560. Males had a median income of $29,145 versus $21,902 for females. The per capita income for the CDP was $19,496. About 4.8% of families and 9.4% of the population were below the poverty line, including 13.0% of those under age 18 and 9.5% of those age 65 or over.
