= Osteen (surname) =

Osteen or O'Steen is a surname. Notable people with the surname include:

- Angie O'Steen, American politician
- Champ Osteen (1877–1962), former baseball shortstop
- Claude Osteen (born 1939), left-handed former baseball pitcher (Cincinnati Reds, Washington Senators, LA Dodgers, Houston Astros, St. Louis Cardinals, Chicago White Sox)
- Darrell Osteen (1943–2017), right-handed former baseball pitcher (Cincinnati Reds, Oakland Athletics)
- Dwayne O'Steen (1954–2001), American professional football player
- John Osteen (1921-1999), first pastor of Lakewood Church in Houston, Texas
- Joel Osteen (born 1963), senior pastor of Lakewood Church in Houston, Texas
- Sam O'Steen (1923 –2000), American film editor and director
- Shyril O'Steen (born 1960), American former competitive rower
- Victoria Osteen (born 1961), wife of Joel Osteen
- William Lindsay Osteen Sr. (1930–2009), judge in North Carolina, USA
- William Lindsay Osteen Jr. (born 1960), judge in North Carolina, USA
