= Florida State Road 442 =

State highway in Florida, United States

State Road 442
- SR 442 in red, CR 442 in blue

Route information
- Maintained by FDOT
- Length: 3.780 mi (6.083 km)

Major junctions
- West end: I-95 in Edgewater
- East end: US 1 in Edgewater

Location
- Country: United States
- State: Florida
- Counties: Volusia

Highway system
- Florida State Highway System; Interstate; US; State; Former; Pre‑1945; Toll; Scenic
← SR 441	→ SR 451

State Road 442 (SR 442) is a short east–west route in Volusia County connecting U.S. Route 1 (US 1) in Edgewater with Interstate 95 (I-95) at exit 244. The road is named Indian River Boulevard.

== Route description ==
West of I-95, the paved road begins as the unsigned County Road 442 (CR 442) providing access to rural ranches. The divided highway runs for about 0.19 miles (0.31 km) before transitioning to SR 442 just west of the I-95 interchange. After the interchange, Indian River Boulevard continues east-northeast as a divided highway passing under a pedestrian bridge for the East Central Regional Rail Trail and intersecting Old Mission Road (CR 4137). After spending its first two miles (3.2 km) in a more rural section of the city, the two roadway carriages come together and pass through a residential neighborhood of Edgewater. SR 442 crosses a railroad and enters a more commercialized part of the city. The state highway ends at a signalized intersection with US 1 (SR 5) with the road continuing east for another 800 feet (240 m) as East Indian River Boulevard.

== Major intersections ==
The entire route is in Edgewater, Volusia County.

mi	km	Destinations	Notes
0.000	0.000	Elkcam Boulevard (CR 442)	West end of state maintenance
0.007– 0.187	0.011– 0.301	I-95 (SR 9) – Jacksonville, Miami	I-95 exit 244
3.780	6.083	US 1 (SR 5) – New Smyrna Beach, Oak Hill	
1.000 mi = 1.609 km; 1.000 km = 0.621 mi
