= Pierson, Florida =

Town in the state of Florida, United States

- Town
- Town of Pierson
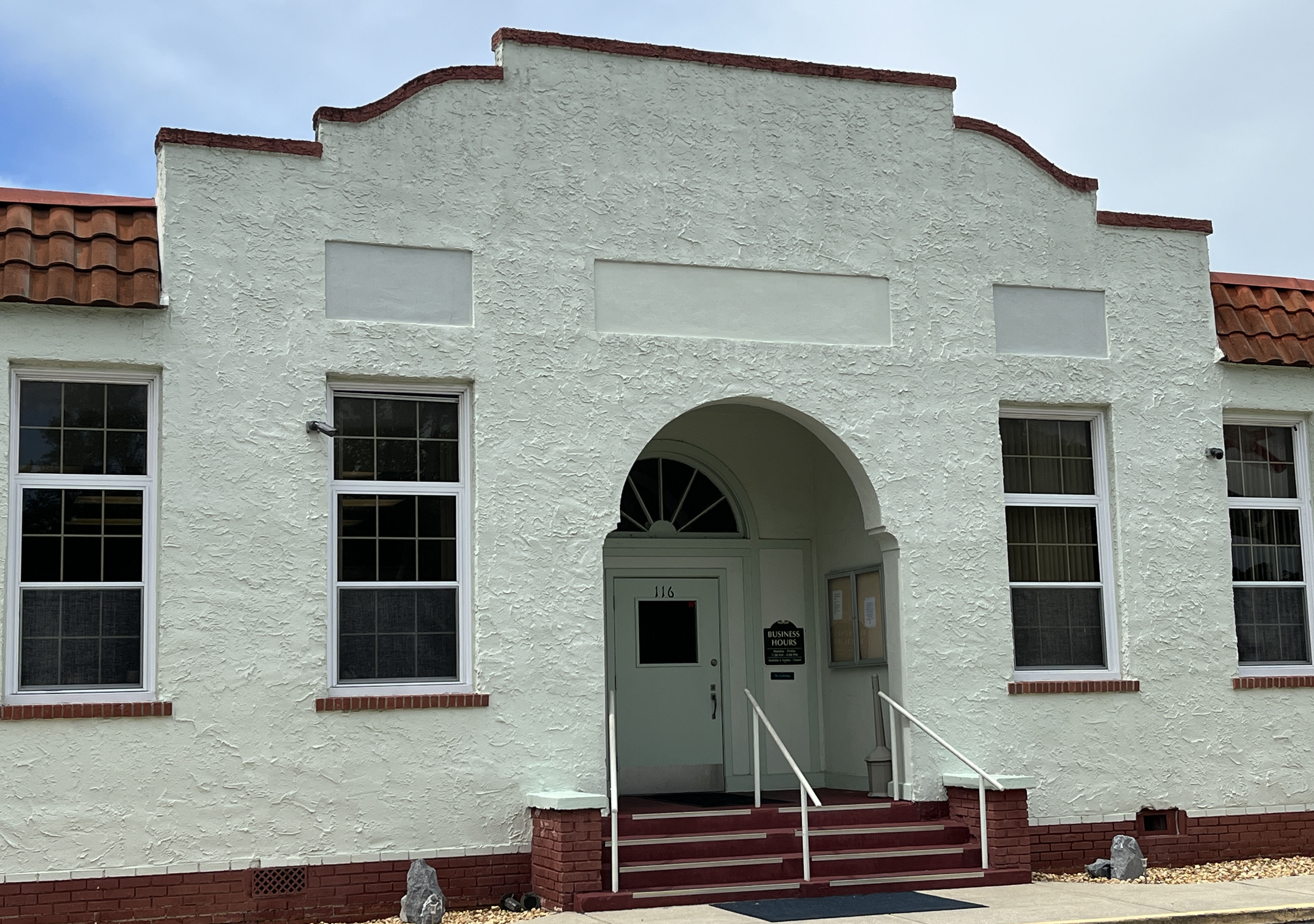
- Pierson Town Center, formerly Pierson Elementary School, which was built in 1926 and now houses the Pierson Town Hall and the Utilities Department.

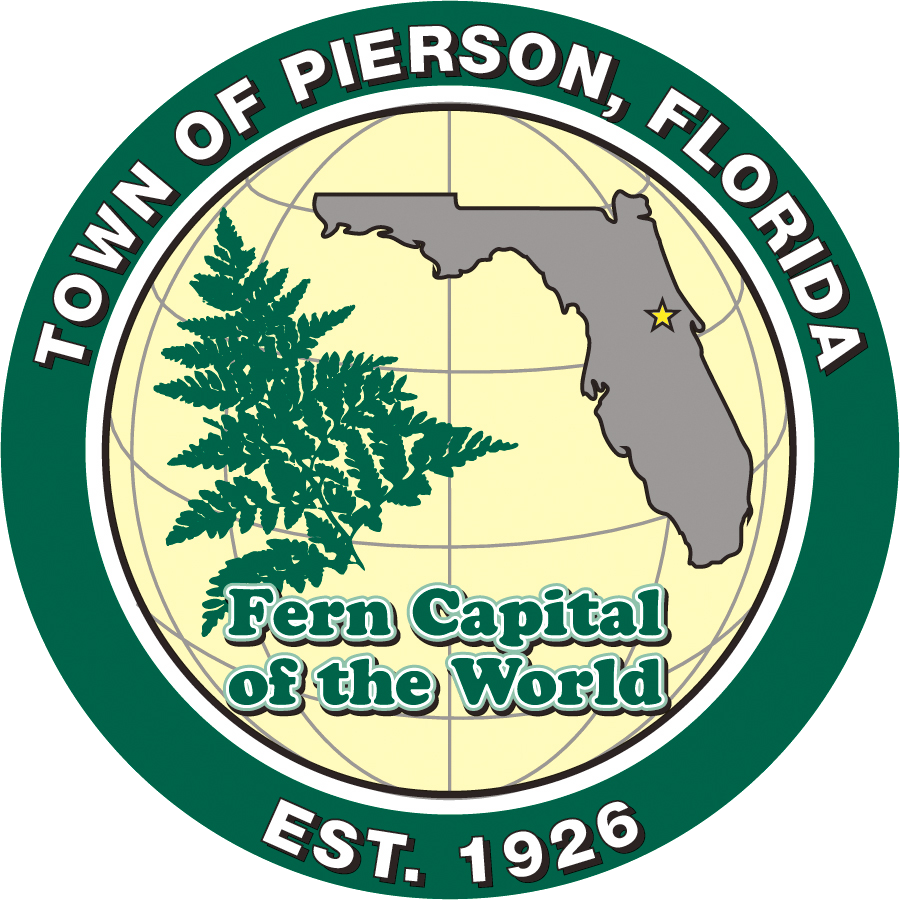
- Seal
- Motto: "Fern Capital of the World"
- Location in Volusia County and the state of Florida
- Coordinates: 29°14′46″N 81°27′19″W
- Country: United States
- State: Florida
- County: Volusia
- Settled (Piersonville): c. 1876–1886
- Incorporated (Town of Pierson): 1926

Government
  - Type: Mayor-Council
  - Mayor: David "Gray" Leonhard
  - Vice Mayor: Robert F. Greenlund
  - Council Members: Linnie R. Richardson; Brandy Peterson, and James "Jimmy" Anderson
  - City Clerk: Yvonne Braddock
  - City Attorney: Christian W. Waugh

Area
  - Total: 10.91 sq mi (28.26 km^{2})
  - Land: 10.20 sq mi (26.41 km^{2})
  - Water: 0.71 sq mi (1.85 km^{2})
- Elevation: 72 ft (22 m)

Population (2020)
  - Total: 1,542
  - Density: 151.2/sq mi (58.38/km^{2})
- Time zone: UTC-5 (Eastern (EST))
  - Summer (DST): UTC-4 (EDT)
- ZIP code: 32180
- Area code: 386
- FIPS code: 12-56425
- GNIS feature ID: 2407108
- Website: www.townofpierson.org

Pierson is a town in Volusia County, Florida, United States. The town is part of the Deltona–Daytona Beach–Ormond Beach, Florida Metropolitan Statistical Area. The population was 1,542 as of the 2020 census.

Pierson bills itself as the "Fern Capital of the World". The town is heavily reliant on agriculture which mainly consists of fern growing. Its ferns are exported worldwide for use in floral arrangements and other decorations.

== Geography ==
Pierson is the northwesternmost incorporated town in Volusia County. U.S. Route 17 and County Road 3 (former US 17) pass through the town.

According to the United States Census Bureau, the town has a total area of 8.7 square miles (23 km^{2}), of which 8.1 square miles (21 km^{2}) is land and 0.6 square miles (1.6 km^{2}) (6.86%) is water.

== Climate ==
The climate in this area is characterized by hot, humid summers and generally mild winters. According to the Köppen climate classification, the Town of Pierson has a humid subtropical climate zone (Cfa).

== Demographics ==
Historical population
Census	Pop.	Note	%±
1930	624		—
1940	541		−13.3%
1950	657		21.4%
1960	716		9.0%
1970	654		−8.7%
1980	1,085		65.9%
1990	2,988		175.4%
2000	2,596		−13.1%
2010	1,736		−33.1%
2020	1,542		−11.2%
U.S. Decennial Census

=== Racial and ethnic composition ===
Pierson racial composition (Hispanics excluded from racial categories) (NH = Non-Hispanic)
Race	Pop 2010	Pop 2020	% 2010	% 2020
White (NH)	693	725	39.92%	47.02%
Black or African American (NH)	80	38	4.61%	2.46%
Native American or Alaska Native (NH)	6	0	0.35%	0.00%
Asian (NH)	6	3	0.35%	0.19%
Pacific Islander or Native Hawaiian (NH)	0	0	0.00%	0.00%
Some other race (NH)	1	10	0.06%	0.65%
Two or more races/Multiracial (NH)	10	36	0.58%	2.33%
Hispanic or Latino (any race)	940	730	54.15%	47.34%
Total	1,736	1,542		

=== 2020 census ===
As of the 2020 census, Pierson had a population of 1,542. The median age was 41.3 years. 23.9% of residents were under the age of 18 and 17.3% of residents were 65 years of age or older. For every 100 females there were 102.1 males, and for every 100 females age 18 and over there were 106.0 males age 18 and over.

0.0% of residents lived in urban areas, while 100.0% lived in rural areas.

There were 527 households in Pierson, of which 34.9% had children under the age of 18 living in them. Of all households, 52.2% were married-couple households, 19.9% were households with a male householder and no spouse or partner present, and 21.1% were households with a female householder and no spouse or partner present. About 20.5% of all households were made up of individuals and 11.4% had someone living alone who was 65 years of age or older.

There were 586 housing units, of which 10.1% were vacant. The homeowner vacancy rate was 1.8% and the rental vacancy rate was 7.2%.

In 2020, the median household income was $52,917, and 11.1% of the population had a bachelor's degree or higher.

According to 2020 American Community Survey 5-year estimates, there were 302 families residing in the town.

=== 2010 census ===
As of the 2010 United States census, there were 1,736 people, 494 households, and 415 families residing in the town.

=== 2000 census ===
As of the census of 2000, there were 2,596 people, 484 households, and 378 families residing in the town. The population density was 123.1 people/km^{2} (319 people/mi^{2}). There were 514 housing units at an average density of 24.4 units/km^{2} (63 units/mi^{2}). The racial makeup of the town was 81.93% White, 4.93% African American, 0.27% Native American, 0.08% Asian, 11.48% from other races, and 1.31% from two or more races. Hispanic or Latino of any race were 62.44% of the population.

In 2000, there were 484 households out of which 43.2% had children under the age of 18 living with them, 61.2% were married couples living together, 10.5% had a female householder with no husband present, and 21.9% were non-families. 18.0% of all households were made up of individuals and 9.5% had someone living alone who was 65 years of age or older. The average household size was 3.35 and the average family size was 3.71.

In 2000, in the town, the population was spread out, with 21.7% under the age of 18, 18.7% from 18 to 24, 38.4% from 25 to 44, 14.2% from 45 to 64, and 6.9% who were 65 years of age or older. The median age was 28 years. For every 100 females there were 142.6 males. For every 100 females age 18 and over, there were 149.9 males.

In 2000, the median income for a household in the town was $26,773, and the median income for a family was $27,461. Males had a median income of $30,247 versus $14,605 for females. The per capita income for the town was $12,450. About 22.8% of families and 33.6% of the population were below the poverty line, including 39.9% of those under age 18 and 21.8% of those age 65 or over.

== Government ==
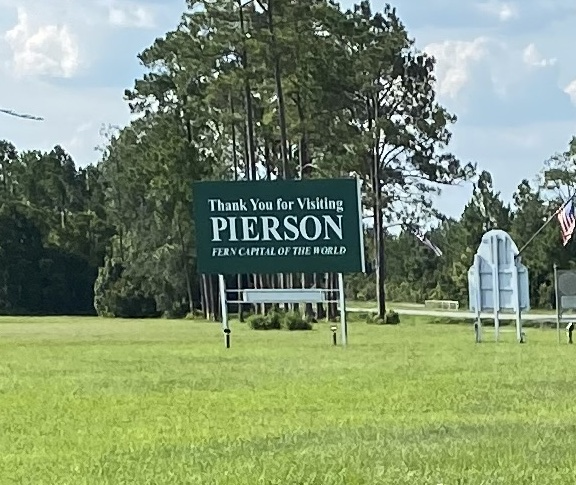
Pierson welcome sign in July 2024

The Town Hall for Pierson is in the Old Pierson Elementary School built in 1926.

As of 2026, these are the politicians for the Town Council of Pierson's mayor-council government:

Name	Office
David "Gray" Leonhard	Mayor
Linnie R. Richardson	Council Member Seat 1
Brandy Peterson	Council Member Seat 2
Robert F. Greenlund	Vice Mayor & Council Member Seat 3
James "Jimmy" Anderson	Council Member Seat 4

== Notable person ==
- Chipper Jones, former MLB baseball star
