= Florida State Road 430 =

State highway in Florida, United States

State Road 430
- SR 430 in red, CR 430 in blue

Route information
- Maintained by FDOT
- Length: 3.353 mi (5.396 km)

Major junctions
- West end: SR 483 / CR 430 / CR 483 in Daytona Beach
- US 1 in Daytona Beach
- East end: SR A1A in Daytona Beach

Location
- Country: United States
- State: Florida
- County: Volusia

Highway system
- Florida State Highway System; Interstate; US; State; Former; Pre‑1945; Toll; Scenic
← SR 429	→ SR 434

State Road 430 (SR 430) is an east–west state highway in Daytona Beach, running between SR 483/Clyde Morris Boulevard and SR A1A/Atlantic Avenue.

West of the Halifax River, the route runs along Mason Avenue; the Seabreeze Bridge over the river is a dual span connecting to a one-way pair on the beachside, with Oakridge Boulevard eastbound and Seabreeze Boulevard westbound.

West of SR 430's western terminus, Mason Avenue continues for 1.873 miles (3.014 km) as County Road 430 (CR 430) to Williamson Boulevard (CR 4009).

== Major intersections ==
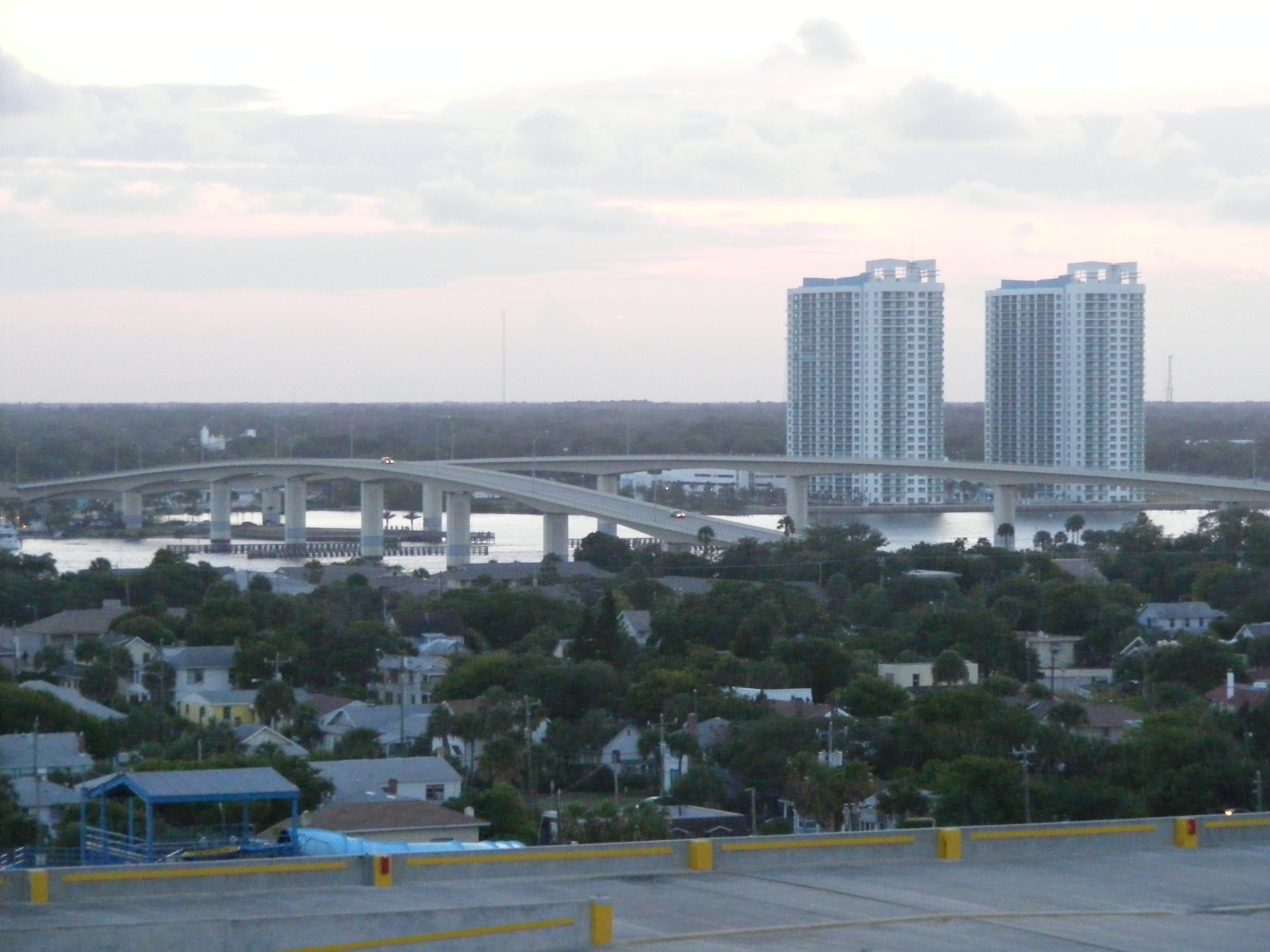
Seabreeze Bridge

The entire route is in Volusia County.

Location	mi	km	Destinations	Notes
Daytona Beach	0.000	0.000	SR 483 south / CR 483 north (Clyde Morris Boulevard) / CR 430 west (Mason Avenue)	
Daytona Beach	0.988	1.590	SR 5A (Nova Road)	
Daytona Beach–Holly Hill line	2.069	3.330	US 1 (Ridgewood Avenue / SR 5)	
Daytona Beach	2.474– 2.908	3.982– 4.680	Seabreeze Bridge over Halifax River (Atlantic Intracoastal Waterway)	
Daytona Beach	3.353	5.396	SR A1A (North Atlantic Avenue)	
1.000 mi = 1.609 km; 1.000 km = 0.621 mi
