= Veterans Memorial Bridge (Daytona Beach) =

Bridge in Florida, United States of America

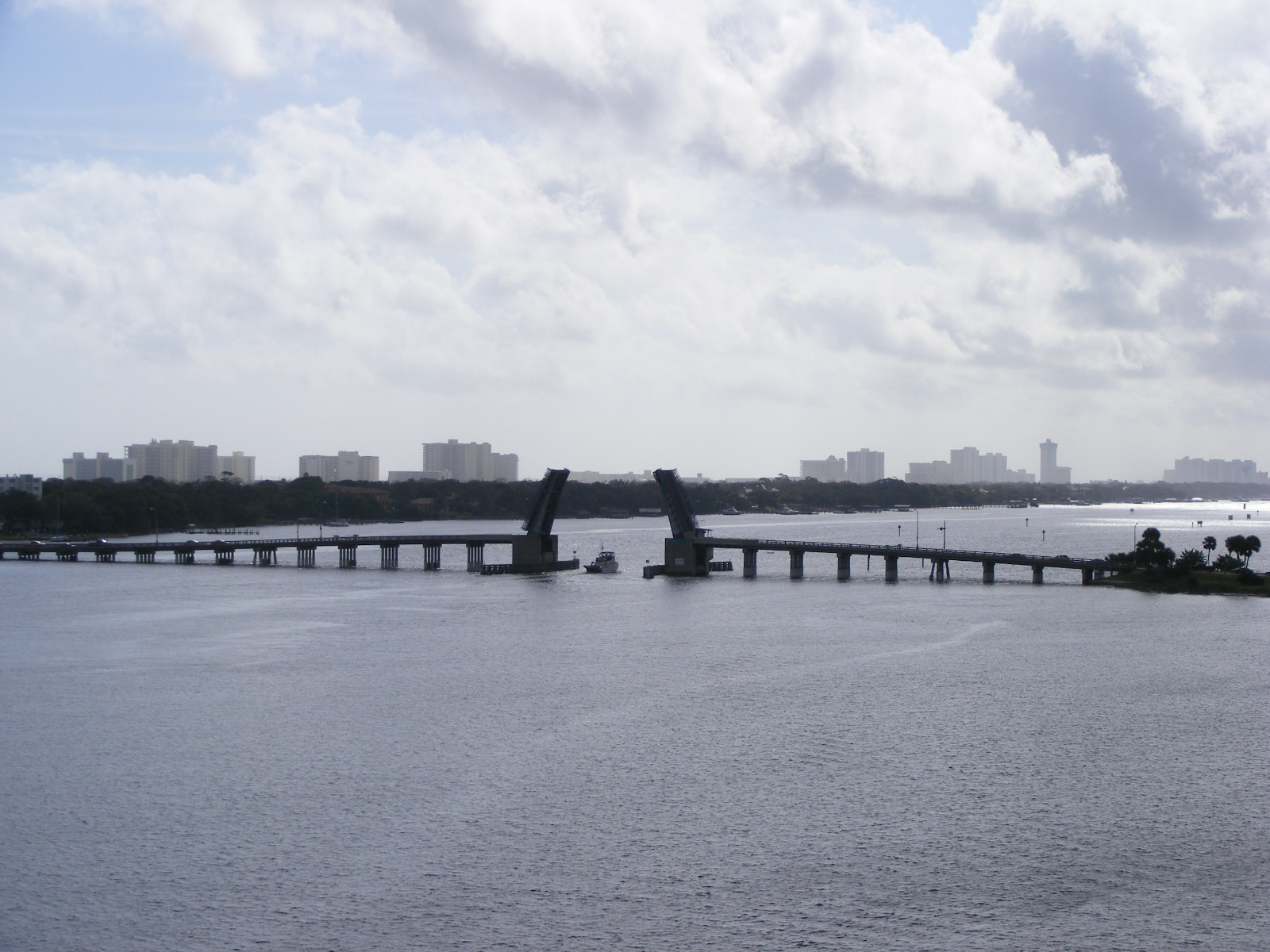
- The second bridge
- Coordinates: 29°12′40″N 81°00′39″W
- Carries: CR 4050; Orange Avenue; Silver Beach Avenue
- Crosses: Halifax River; Intracoastal Waterway
- Locale: Daytona Beach, Florida
- Official name: Tom Staed Veterans Memorial Bridge
- Maintained by: Florida Department of Transportation

History
- Construction end: 2020

Statistics
- Toll: Free

The Veterans Memorial Bridge, commonly called the Orange Avenue Bridge, spans the Halifax River and Intracoastal Waterway in Daytona Beach, Florida, Volusia County, Florida. The bridge carries vehicles across two lanes of CR 4050 from Orange Avenue and Silver Beach Avenue.

== History ==
=== First bridge ===
The first bridge at this location was built in 1899, connecting the then separate towns of Daytona and Daytona Beach.

=== Second bridge ===
In 2016, a project aimed at replacing the old Orange Avenue Bridge commenced. The project lasted for 32 months and the new, high rise, concrete arch bridge came into existence.

=== Memorial plaques ===
The bridge has 28 scenic overlooks, each with plaques commemorating conflicts in the military history of the United States. Each plaque includes a description of conflicts and their outcomes; the number of military personnel killed, wounded, or missing in action; a QR code linked to additional data; and a Braille plate with information.

Plaque sequence	Event memorialized	Years
1st	American Revolutionary War	1775–1883
2nd	Northwest Indian War	1785–1793
2nd	Quasi-War	1778–1800
2nd	First Barbary War	1801–1805
3rd	The War of 1812	1812–1815
4th	Tecumseh's War	1811
4th	Creek War	1813–1814
4th	Second Barbary War	1815
5th	American Indian Wars	1817–1898
6th	Mexican–American War	1846–1848
7th	Second Opium War	1856–1860
7th	Utah War	1857–1858
7th	First & Second Cortina Wars	1859–1861
8th	Civil War	1861–1865
9th	Overthrow of the Kingdom of Hawaii	1893
9th	Second Samoan Civil War	1898–1899
10th	Spanish–American War	1898–1902
11th	Philippine–American War	1899–1902
11th	Boxer Rebellion	1899–1901
11th	Border War	1910–1919
12th	World War I	1917–1918
13th	World War II	1941–1946
14th	World War II— European Theater	1941–1946
15th	World War II— European Theater	1941–1946
16th	World War II— Pacific Theater	1941–1946
17th	Korean War	1950–1953
18th	Vietnam War	1964–1975
19th	Mayaguez Incident	1975
19th	Operation Eagle Claw	1980
19th	Gulf of Sidra	1981
20th	Operation Urgent Fury	1983
20th	Beirut Barracks Bombing	1983
20th	Operation El Dorado Canyon	1986
21st	Operations Desert Shield & Desert Storm	1990–1993
22nd	Operation Just Cause	1989
22nd	Operation Restore Hope	1992–1993
22nd	Operation Gothic Serpent	1993
23rd	Bosnian War	1993–1995
23rd	Operation Uphold Democracy	1994–1995
23rd	Kosovo War	1998–1999
24th	Operation Enduring Freedom	2001–2014
25th	Operation Iraqi Freedom	2003–2010
26th	Plaque describing the Veterans Memorial Park (below the bridge)	
27th	Operation New Dawn	2010–Present
28th	Military Intervention in Libya	2011
29th	[blank]	

== See also ==
- List of crossings of the Halifax River
