= Florida State Road 415 =

State highway in Florida, United States

State Road 415 and County Road 415
- SR 415 in red, CR 415 in blue

Route information
- Maintained by FDOT
- Length: 18.487 mi (29.752 km)

Major junctions
- South end: SR 46 near Sanford
- North end: SR 44 / CR 415 in Samsula

Location
- Country: United States
- State: Florida
- County: Volusia

Highway system
- Florida State Highway System; Interstate; US; State; Former; Pre‑1945; Toll; Scenic
← SR 414	→ SR 416

State Road 415 (SR 415) is a north–south route in Central Florida running between State Road 44 in Volusia County and SR 46 in Seminole County.

The road continues north of State Road 44 to U.S. Route 92 (US 92) as County Road 415 (CR 415), Tomoka Farms Road.

Also SR 415 connects with the eastern terminus of Lake Mary Boulevard at the intersection of SR 415 and SR 46.

== Route description ==
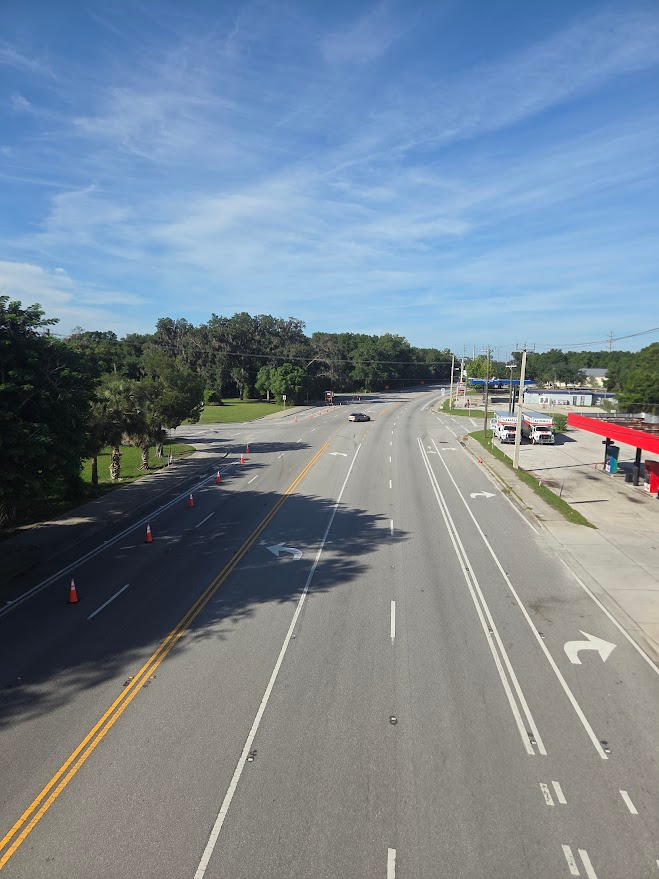
SR 415 in Osteen, Florida

State Road 415 begins in Seminole County at State Road 46 just east of the Orlando-Sanford International Airport and heads straight north. The only intersection of any importance within the county is CR 415 (Celery Avenue), a county connecting spur which leads to downtown Sanford at US 17/92. Here the road shifts to the northeast and crosses the St. Johns River over the Osteen Bridge, where it enters Volusia County and runs through the Lake Monroe Conservation Area, which it leaves at the intersection of Reed Ellis Road. In Osteen SR 415 serves as the terminus for three separate County Roads; CR 5758, CR 4164, and CR 4162 respectively. Here, it turns straight north again until it approaches CR 4145 and then curves northeast again, as it passes through swampland and over dry creeks and canals before running through Alamana where it runs near the west side of Lake Ashby, crosses a bridge over the Lake Ashby Canal, and serves as the address for the privately owned Leffler Airport.

The road turns at a slight left angle but still remains northeast as it terminates at State Road 44 east of New Smyrna Speedway in Samsula. However, it continues to run north as County Road 415 (Tomoka Farms Road), which runs west of the city limits of New Smyrna Beach and Port Orange. From here, the road intersects CR 4118, serves as the western terminus of CR 421, a county extension of SR 421. Later the route runs along the border with the in City of Daytona Beach just before it passes over I-4 with no access, west if that interstate's eastern terminates terminus with I-95, and later runs past the Daytona Flea and Farmers Market on the southeast corner of CR 4068 (Bellevue Avenue) just south of the intersection with U.S. Route 92. Continuing north while now fully within the Daytona Beach City Limits, CR 415 moves closer to I-95 until it becomes a frontage road of the southbound lanes of I-95 itself. North of the access road to the Dunn Avenue overpass, CR 415 is flanked by I-95 on the east side, and a series of neighboring automobile dealerships on the west side which contain the Tomoka River wetlands as their back yards. Volusia County Road 415 officially ends at CR 4019, better known as the LPGA Boulevard west of exit 265 on Interstate 95.

== Major intersections ==
County	Location	mi	km	Destinations	Notes
Seminole	Sanford	0.000	0.000	SR 46 to I-95 – Mims, Sanford	
Seminole		0.811	1.305	CR 415 west (Celery Avenue)	
St. Johns River		1.1	1.8	Osteen Bridge	
Volusia	Osteen	5.643	9.082	CR 4162 west (Doyle Road) – Enterprise	
Volusia	Deltona	7.115	11.450	CR 4145 west (Howland Boulevard)	
Volusia	Samsula	18.487	29.752	SR 44 / CR 415 north – Daytona Beach, DeLand, New Smyrna Beach	
1.000 mi = 1.609 km; 1.000 km = 0.621 mi
