= Oak Hill, Florida =

- City
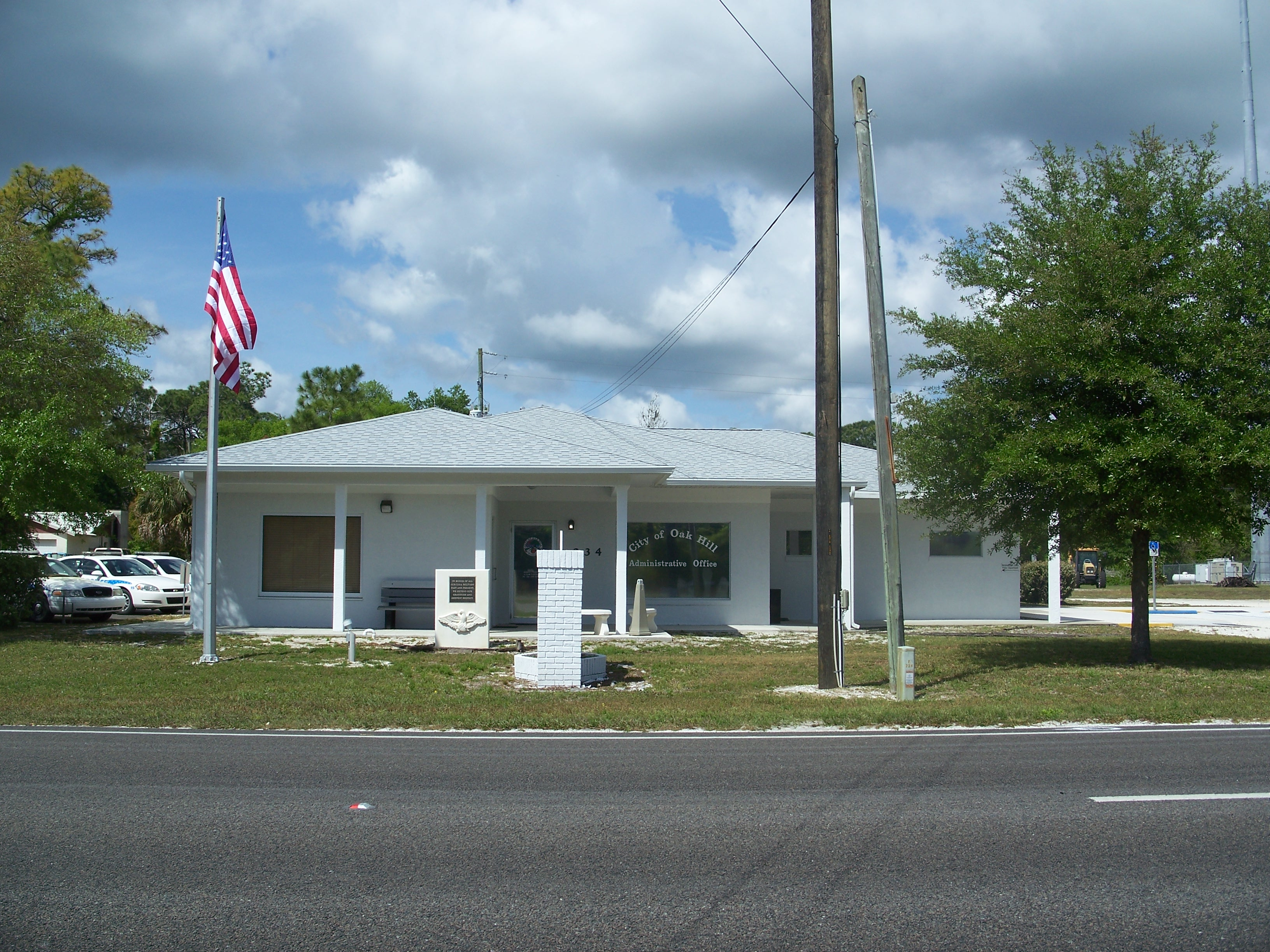
- Oak Hill City Hall

- Seal
- Motto: "Where We Make Fishers of Many"
- Location in Volusia County and the state of Florida
- Coordinates: 28°52′17″N 80°50′16″W
- Country: United States
- State: Florida
- County: Volusia
- Settled: 1857-1874
- Incorporated (Town of Oak Hill): 1925
- Incorporated (City of Oak Hill): 1927

Government
  - Type: Mayor–Commission
  - Mayor: Ricky Taylor
  - Vice Mayor: Joseph Catigano
  - Commissioners: Linda Hyatt, Mark Drollinger, and Carrie Werning
  - City Manager: John Barkley
  - City Attorney: Mike Kelly

Area
  - Total: 11.19 sq mi (28.98 km^{2})
  - Land: 6.72 sq mi (17.40 km^{2})
  - Water: 4.47 sq mi (11.58 km^{2})
- Elevation: 0 ft (0 m)

Population (2020)
  - Total: 1,986
  - Density: 295.5/sq mi (114.11/km^{2})
- Time zone: UTC-5 (Eastern (EST))
  - Summer (DST): UTC-4 (EDT)
- ZIP code: 32759
- Area code: 386
- FIPS code: 12-50450
- GNIS feature ID: 2404408
- Website: www.oakhillfl.com

Oak Hill is a city in Volusia County, Florida, United States. It is part of the Deltona–Daytona Beach–Ormond Beach, Florida Metropolitan Statistical Area. The population was 1,986 at the 2020 census.

== History ==
The first inhabitants of what would become Oak Hill were the native Timucuan, who lived along the shore from c. 2000 BCE to 1500 CE, when European settlers started to arrive. In 1564, the French illustrator, Jacques LeMoyne, made a map showing an Indian village named Surruque el Viejo near el Baradero de Suroc. The name "Oak Hill" seems to have been first used by seasonal northern loggers circa 1850, named for an oak tree that grew on the native Timuca tribe's shell mound near the home of J.D. Mitchell, who was the community's first settler.

Florida became a state in 1845, and British and American settlers started to arrive. They began to displace the various tribes, including the Seminoles, who fought back. One Seminole War raid in 1856 resulted in four deaths. A resident, Arad Shelton, took their bodies north to New Smyrna Beach by wagon. Permanent, uninterrupted settlement of non-indigenous people occurred between 1857 through 1874.

By the American Civil War, Oak Hill had a salt works, some part-time stores, and the first orange groves had been planted (by a Mr. Mitchell). Oak Hill also has Civil War veterans buried in the local cemetery: five who fought for the Union, and six who fought for the Confederacy.

The municipality was officially incorporated as the Town of Oak Hill in 1925, and reincorporated as the City of Oak Hill in 1927.

Hotels, stores, a post office, and a school operated by Rev. Wicks in the Congregational church served a few white students in the morning, and several Black students in the afternoon. A public school for white students was constructed in the early 1890s, and a prominent Black freedman, Bill Williams, provided instruction and space for Black students in 1901. A public school for Black students was constructed in 1927.

In 1924, a grade 1 through 10 school was built on Ridge Road, just to the east of Dixie Highway (now US-1), which was paved the same year. This building was replaced in 1960 by a new structure, which eventually became the W.F. Burns Elementary School. In 2008, the county school board closed the school (citing budget cuts) and slated it for demolition. County work crews stripped the facility of anything of value.

The non-profit Oak Hill Community Trust, with the assistance and guidance of local architect Sid Corhern, Tom Gibbs, and many other concerned citizens purchased the property from the Volusia County Schools public school district's school board, in late 2009. Beginning in September 2010, hundreds of volunteers gave thousands of hours of their time to refurbish the buildings. A charter school operator was contacted and after voluminous paperwork, was approved in January 2011. They did plumbing, electrical, painting, landscaping and much more, often with donated materials. The school opened in August 2011, with 260 students enrolled.

In 2012, Kennedy Space Center (KSC) donated a surplus 10,000 square foot office building to the school, on condition that it had to be moved from KSC without delay. Again, volunteers stepped forward and the building was delivered (in eight sections) to the site, reassembled, refurbished as classrooms, and is now in use.

The school is a STEM (Science, Technology, Engineering, Math) school, and after only a few years of operation, has already achieved a "A" rating. As of 2024, there are 1,100 students in grades K through 12. Many are local, and some come from as far away as Ormond Beach and Orange City.

In the past, citrus growing and commercial fishing were the primary income sources for residents of Oak Hill. A series of hard freezes, cold snaps and the advent of citrus canker have greatly reduced the number of citrus groves, and by 1995, the State of Florida's ban on gillnetting eliminated most of the fishing business. There are several fish farms, clam farms, and oyster farms in operation.

The City of Oak Hill was first chartered in 1927. Local government was based on a Mayor-Commission, with each commissioner functioning as head of a municipal department. In 1930, the city was temporarily disbanded during the Great Depression, when the city petitioned the government to inactivate the charter, which was granted. The city later petitioned the government to reactivate the charter, in 1962.

Clarence Goodrich was the city's mayor from 1963 to 1989, the longest term any mayor has held in the state of Florida. Bobby Greatrex was mayor from 1989 to 1990, and Bruce Burch served from 1990 to 1994. Toreatha Wood became the city's first female mayor, as well as first African-American female mayor, serving from 1999 to 2000. Darry Evans was the first African American male mayor. Lorna Travis was mayor from 2000 to 2001, Susan Cook was mayor from 2001 to 2002, and Bob Jackson was mayor in 2002. Mayor Darla Lauer was the first elected Mayor from 2009-2010 having served as Mayor and Vice-Mayor from 2003-2009 when she resigned and moved to Alaska, Mayor Lauer was replaced by Mary Lee Cook, serving as Vice-Mayor.

On the evening of August 1, 2011, the city commission voted to disband the city's police department due to ongoing acrimony, personality conflicts and policy disagreements between the city commissioners and the police department. All nine employees received unemployment benefits. The Volusia County Sheriff's Department assumed law enforcement duties for the city.

== Geography ==
According to the United States Census Bureau, the city has a total area of 11.7 square miles (30.3 km^{2}), of which 6.6 square miles (17.0 km^{2}) is land and 5.1 square miles (13.2 km^{2}) (43.75%) is water.

=== Climate ===
The climate in this area is characterized by hot, humid summers and generally mild winters. According to the Köppen climate classification, the City of Oak Hill has a humid subtropical climate zone (Cfa).

== Demographics ==
Historical population
Census	Pop.	Note	%±
1930	457		—
1940	509		11.4%
1950	683		34.2%
1960	758		11.0%
1970	747		−1.5%
1980	938		25.6%
1990	917		−2.2%
2000	1,378		50.3%
2010	1,792		30.0%
2020	1,986		10.8%
U.S. Decennial Census

=== Racial and ethnic composition ===
Oak Hill racial composition (Hispanics excluded from racial categories) (NH = Non-Hispanic)
Race	Pop 2010	Pop 2020	% 2010	% 2020
White (NH)	1,467	1,667	81.86%	83.94%
Black or African American (NH)	249	187	13.90%	9.42%
Native American or Alaska Native (NH)	8	5	0.45%	0.25%
Asian (NH)	9	12	0.50%	0.60%
Pacific Islander or Native Hawaiian (NH)	0	1	0.00%	0.05%
Some other race (NH)	0	5	0.00%	0.25%
Two or more races/Multiracial (NH)	28	67	1.56%	3.37%
Hispanic or Latino (any race)	31	42	1.73%	2.11%
Total	1,792	1,986		

=== 2020 census ===
As of the 2020 census, Oak Hill had a population of 1,986. The median age was 58.6 years. 12.5% of residents were under the age of 18 and 34.0% of residents were 65 years of age or older. For every 100 females there were 101.6 males, and for every 100 females age 18 and over there were 105.7 males age 18 and over.

81.8% of residents lived in urban areas, while 18.2% lived in rural areas.

There were 938 households in Oak Hill, of which 19.9% had children under the age of 18 living in them. Of all households, 48.6% were married-couple households, 21.1% were households with a male householder and no spouse or partner present, and 22.1% were households with a female householder and no spouse or partner present. About 27.6% of all households were made up of individuals and 14.7% had someone living alone who was 65 years of age or older.

There were 1,185 housing units, of which 20.8% were vacant. The homeowner vacancy rate was 2.3% and the rental vacancy rate was 3.8%.

The 2020 American Community Survey 5-year estimates reported 604 families residing in the city.

=== 2010 census ===
As of the 2010 United States census, there were 1,792 people, 757 households, and 581 families residing in the city.

=== 2000 census ===
As of the census of 2000, there were 1,378 people, 549 households, and 410 families residing in the city. The population density was 216.1 inhabitants per square mile (83.4/km^{2}). There were 695 housing units at an average density of 109.0 units per square mile (42.1 units/km^{2}). The racial makeup of the city was 81.79% White, 16.26% African American, 0.65% Native American, 0.22% Asian, 0.51% from other races, and 0.58% from two or more races. Hispanic or Latino of any race were 0.65% of the population.

Of the 549 households in 2000, 25.3% had children under the age of 18 living with them, 60.3% were married couples living together, 8.9% had a female householder with no husband present, and 25.3% were non-families. 20.6% of all households were made up of individuals, and 10.2% had someone living alone who was 65 years of age or older. The average household size was 2.51 and the average family size was 2.84.

In 2000, in the city, the population was spread out, with 22.1% under the age of 18, 6.9% from 18 to 24, 24.6% from 25 to 44, 25.4% from 45 to 64, and 21.0% who were 65 years of age or older. The median age was 42 years. For every 100 females, there were 106.9 males. For every 100 females age 18 and over, there were 104.0 males.

In 2000, the median income for a household in the city was $32,130, and the median income for a family was $35,682. Males had a median income of $24,643 versus $22,917 for females. The per capita income for the city was $16,158. About 7.8% of families and 14.4% of the population were below the poverty line, including 25.0% of those under age 18 and 6.8% of those age 65 or over.
