= Osteen Bridge =

Bridge in Florida, United States of America

- Coordinates: 28.8026°N 81.2102°W
- Carries: SR 415 (4 general purpose lanes)
- Crosses: St. Johns River
- Locale: Indian Mound Village, Florida
- Official name: Douglas Stenstrom Bridge
- Maintained by: Florida Department of Transportation
- ID number: 790124; 790219

Characteristics
- Design: Steel-reinforced concrete
- Total length: 2,426 feet (739 m)
- Clearance below: 24 feet (7.3 m)

History
- Opened: April 1977

Location
- Interactive map of Osteen Bridge

The Douglas Stenstrom Bridge, also known as the Osteen Bridge, is a steel-and-concrete bridge located in Indian Mound Village, Florida, east of Sanford, that carries State Road 415 over the St. Johns River. The current bridge was completed in 1977, replacing a 1920s vintage bridge that was considered the most dangerous in the state; a second parallel span was completed in 2015.

== History ==
The original Osteen Bridge, a hand-turned swing bridge, was built in the 1920s; it was rebuilt in 1947. The bridge is located just upstream from Lake Monroe, crossing the Indian Mound Slu portion of the river between Lake Monroe and Lake Jesup; by the 1970s the original bridge, only 14 feet (4.3 m) in width, proved dangerous and too narrow for continued use, being described as "the worst bridge in Florida" in 1972. In 1973, mats of invasive water hyacinth caused damage to the bridge's structure.

An accident in 1974 that killed five people when their van was run off the bridge by a truck gave the final impetus to the construction of a new bridge, replacing the dangerous older span. The new Osteen Bridge was constructed starting in 1975, with work continuing through 1976 and early 1977; constructed by the Houdaille-Duval-Wright company of Jacksonville, the project cost approximately $2.6 million USD. The new bridge opened in April 1977, and was officially named the Douglas Stenstrom Bridge in 1978, after a Florida state senator Douglas Stenstrom who had pushed for the completion of the project. Part of the previous bridge was left in place, serving as a fishing pier.

Repairs to the bridge were undertaken during 2011. A second parallel bridge was completed in 2015 to support the widening of SR 415 to 2 lanes in each direction.
