= National Register of Historic Places listings in Volusia County, Florida =

Location of Volusia County in Florida

This is a list of the National Register of Historic Places listings in Volusia County, Florida.

This is intended to be a complete list of the properties and districts on the National Register of Historic Places in Volusia County, Florida, United States. The locations of National Register properties and districts for which the latitude and longitude coordinates are included below, may be seen in a map.

There are 106 properties and districts listed on the National Register in the county, including 2 National Historic Landmarks. There are also five former listings.

This National Park Service list is complete through NPS recent listings posted August 7, 2026.

Contents: Counties in Florida (non-linked contain no National Register listings)
Alachua - Baker - Bay - Bradford - Brevard - Broward - Calhoun - Charlotte - Citrus - Clay - Collier - Columbia - DeSoto - Dixie - Duval - Escambia - Flagler - Franklin - Gadsden - Gilchrist - Glades - Gulf - Hamilton - Hardee - Hendry - Hernando - Highlands - Hillsborough (Tampa) - Holmes - Indian River - Jackson - Jefferson - Lafayette - Lake - Lee - Leon - Levy - Liberty - Madison - Manatee - Marion - Martin - Miami-Dade (Miami) - Monroe - Nassau - Okaloosa - Okeechobee - Orange - Osceola - Palm Beach - Pasco - Pinellas - Polk - Putnam - St. Johns - St. Lucie - Santa Rosa - Sarasota - Seminole - Sumter - Suwannee - Taylor - Union - Volusia - Wakulla - Walton - Washington

== Current listings ==
	Name on the Register	Image	Date listed	Location	City or town	Description
1	The Abbey	The Abbey	April 9, 1987 (#87000615)	426 South Beach Street; 29°12′17″N 81°01′01″W	Daytona Beach	
2	Airport Clear Zone Archeological Site		July 10, 2008 (#08000639)	Address Restricted	New Smyrna Beach	Part of the Archeological Resources of the 18th-Century Smyrnea Settlement of Dr. Andrew Turnbull MPS
3	All Saint's Episcopal Church	All Saint's Episcopal Church	May 3, 1974 (#74000656)	Corner of DeBary Avenue Northeast and Clark Street; 28°52′10″N 81°16′10″W	Enterprise	
4	Anderson–Price Memorial Library Building	Anderson–Price Memorial Library Building	January 26, 1984 (#84000967)	42 North Beach Street; 29°17′12″N 81°03′23″W	Ormond Beach	
5	Barberville Central High School	Barberville Central High School	February 3, 1993 (#92001838)	1776 Lightfoot Lane; 29°11′00″N 81°25′23″W	Barberville	
6	Mary McLeod Bethune Home	Mary McLeod Bethune Home	December 2, 1974 (#74000655)	Bethune-Cookman College campus 29°12′45″N 81°01′56″W	Daytona Beach	Home of educator and civil rights leader Mary McLeod Bethune
7	Bethune–Cookman College Historic District	Bethune–Cookman College Historic District	March 21, 1996 (#96000298)	620 Dr. Mary McLeod Bethune Boulevard; 29°12′43″N 81°01′55″W	Daytona Beach	Part of the Daytona Beach MPS
8	Blanchette Archeological Site		July 10, 2008 (#08000640)	Address Restricted	New Smyrna Beach	Part of the Archeological Resources of the 18th-Century Smyrnea Settlement of Dr. Andrew Turnbull MPS
9	Delos A. Blodgett House	Delos A. Blodgett House	August 2, 1993 (#93000724)	404 Ridgewood Avenue; 29°12′16″N 81°01′13″W	Daytona Beach	
10	Casements Annex	Casements Annex	October 6, 1988 (#88001720)	127 Riverside Drive; 29°17′07″N 81°02′45″W	Ormond Beach	Part of the Historic Winter Residences of Ormond Beach, 1878-1925 MPS
11	The Casements	The Casements	June 30, 1972 (#72001536)	15 East Granada Avenue; 29°17′21″N 81°02′45″W	Ormond Beach	
12	Chief Master at Arms House	Chief Master at Arms House	February 15, 2002 (#02000003)	910 Biscayne Boulevard; 29°03′29″N 81°17′18″W	DeLand	Part of the Florida's Historic World War II Military Resources MPS
13	City Island	City Island	January 7, 2000 (#99001646)	108 East Orange Avenue; 29°12′34″N 81°00′58″W	Daytona Beach	
14	City Island Ball Park	City Island Ball Park	October 22, 1998 (#98001253)	City Island, across from the Daytona Beach business district 29°12′34″N 81°01′00″W	Daytona Beach	Part of the Daytona Beach MPS
15	Coronado Historic District	Coronado Historic District	February 21, 1997 (#97000098)	Roughly bounded by Columbus, Due East, and Pine Avenues, and the Indian River; 29°02′19″N 80°54′10″W	New Smyrna Beach	
16	Cypress Street Elementary School	Cypress Street Elementary School	December 2, 1996 (#96001333)	868 West George W Engram Boulevard; 29°12′46″N 81°02′24″W	Daytona Beach	Part of the Daytona Beach MPS
17	Daytona Beach Bandshell and Oceanfront Park Complex	Daytona Beach Bandshell and Oceanfront Park Complex	March 5, 1999 (#99000159)	Ocean Avenue, north of the junction of Main Street and Atlantic; 29°13′41″N 81°00′29″W	Daytona Beach	Part of the Daytona Beach MPS
18	Daytona Beach Surfside Historic District	Daytona Beach Surfside Historic District	August 1, 1996 (#96000851)	Roughly bounded by Auditorium Boulevard, the Atlantic Ocean, U.S. Route 92, and the Halifax River; 29°13′30″N 81°00′36″W	Daytona Beach	Part of the Daytona Beach MPS
19	DeBary Hall	DeBary Hall	July 24, 1972 (#72000354)	DeBary Mansion State Park; 28°52′29″N 81°17′50″W	DeBary	
20	DeLand Hall	DeLand Hall	January 27, 1983 (#83001441)	Stetson University campus 29°02′06″N 81°18′12″W	DeLand	
21	DeLeon Springs Colored School	DeLeon Springs Colored School	August 1, 2003 (#03000702)	330 East Retta Street; 29°06′51″N 81°20′51″W	DeLeon Springs	Part of the Florida's Historic Black Public Schools MPS
22	Dickinson Memorial Library and Park	Dickinson Memorial Library and Park	February 8, 1995 (#95000020)	148 South Volusia Avenue (US 17); 28°56′52″N 81°17′55″W	Orange City	
23	Dix House	Dix House	September 6, 1989 (#88001721)	178 North Beach Street; 29°17′25″N 81°03′28″W	Ormond Beach	Part of the Historic Winter Residences of Ormond Beach, 1878-1925 MPS
24	Bartholomew J. Donnelly House	Bartholomew J. Donnelly House	August 2, 1993 (#93000726)	801 North Peninsula Drive; 29°14′16″N 81°01′10″W	Daytona Beach	
25	Downtown DeLand Historic District	Downtown DeLand Historic District	December 23, 1987 (#87001796)	Roughly bounded by Florida and Rich Avenues, Woodland Boulevard, and Howry Avenue; 29°01′39″N 81°18′17″W	DeLand	
26	Dunlawton Avenue Historic District	Dunlawton Avenue Historic District	February 5, 1998 (#98000055)	Roughly along Dunlawton Avenue to Lafayette Avenue, and Orange Avenue and Wellman Street; 29°08′32″N 80°59′29″W	Port Orange	Part of the Port Orange MPS
27	Dunlawton Plantation-Sugar Mill Ruins	Dunlawton Plantation-Sugar Mill Ruins	August 28, 1973 (#73000606)	950 Old Sugar Mill Road; 29°08′29″N 81°00′26″W	Port Orange	
28	Eastwood Terrace Hotel	Eastwood Terrace Hotel	April 2, 2019 (#100003586)	442 E. New York Ave. 29°01′40″N 81°17′43″W	Deland	
29	El Pino Parque Historic District	El Pino Parque Historic District	April 26, 1993 (#93000318)	1412-1604 North Halifax Drive; 29°15′07″N 81°01′44″W	Daytona Beach	
30	El Real Retiro	El Real Retiro	November 10, 1987 (#87001557)	636 North Riverside Drive and 647 Faulkner Street; 29°02′04″N 80°55′41″W	New Smyrna Beach	
31	First Presbyterian Church Archeological Site	First Presbyterian Church Archeological Site	July 10, 2008 (#08000635)	509 Magnolia Street; 29°01′16″N 80°55′12″W	New Smyrna Beach	Part of the Archeological Resources of the 18th-Century Smyrnea Settlement of Dr. Andrew Turnbull MPS
32	Seth French House	Seth French House	February 12, 2003 (#03000005)	319 East French Avenue; 28°57′09″N 81°17′47″W	Orange City	
33	Gamble Place Historic District	Gamble Place Historic District	September 29, 1993 (#93000563)	1819 Taylor Road; 29°05′22″N 81°02′44″W	Port Orange	
34	Grace Episcopal Church and Guild Hall	Grace Episcopal Church and Guild Hall	February 5, 1998 (#98000058)	4100 Ridgewood Avenue; 29°08′35″N 80°59′14″W	Port Orange	Part of the Port Orange MPS
35	Grange Archeological Site		July 10, 2008 (#08000631)	Address Restricted	New Smyrna Beach	Part of the Archeological Resources of the 18th-Century Smyrnea Settlement of Dr. Andrew Turnbull MPS
36	Green Mound	Green Mound	June 4, 2020 (#100005243)	Ponce Preserve, 4400 South Peninsula Dr. 29°06′55″N 80°56′58″W	Ponce Inlet	
37	The Hammocks	The Hammocks	September 5, 1989 (#88001719)	311 John Anderson Highway; 29°17′51″N 81°03′06″W	Ormond Beach	Part of the Historic Winter Residences of Ormond Beach, 1878-1925 MPS
38	Hawks Archeological Site		July 10, 2008 (#08000636)	Address Restricted	Edgewater	Part of the Archeological Resources of the 18th-Century Smyrnea Settlement of Dr. Andrew Turnbull MPS
39	Alexander Haynes House	Alexander Haynes House	September 7, 1995 (#95001070)	128 West Howry Avenue; 29°01′33″N 81°18′18″W	DeLand	
40	Holly Hill Municipal Building	Holly Hill Municipal Building	April 8, 1993 (#93000285)	1065 Ridgewood Avenue; 29°14′43″N 81°02′25″W	Holly Hill	
41	Janet's Archeological Site		July 10, 2008 (#08000630)	Address Restricted	New Smyrna Beach	Part of the Archeological Resources of the 18th-Century Smyrnea Settlement of Dr. Andrew Turnbull MPS
42	Kilkoff House	Kilkoff House	October 8, 1997 (#97001216)	1145 West New York Avenue; 29°01′42″N 81°19′33″W	DeLand	
43	Amos Kling House	Amos Kling House	December 2, 1993 (#93001353)	220-222 Magnolia Avenue; 29°12′34″N 81°01′18″W	Daytona Beach	
44	S.H. Kress and Co. Building	S.H. Kress and Co. Building	July 7, 1983 (#83001442)	140 South Beach Street; 29°12′38″N 81°01′10″W	Daytona Beach	
45	Lake Helen Historic District	Lake Helen Historic District	September 16, 1993 (#93000981)	Roughly bounded by West New York, Lakeview, Park, and Euclid Avenues; 28°59′18″N 81°14′03″W	Lake Helen	Part of the Lake Helen MPS
46	Doris Leeper House	Doris Leeper House	November 27, 2020 (#100005857)	1/2 mi. south of Eldora Rd. in the Canaveral National Seashore; 28°54′11″N 80°49′02″W	New Smyrna Beach	
47	Lippincott Mansion	Lippincott Mansion	February 21, 1985 (#85000304)	150 South Beach Street; 29°16′51″N 81°03′15″W	Ormond Beach	
48	Merchants Bank Building	Merchants Bank Building	January 6, 1986 (#86000025)	252 South Beach Street; 29°12′30″N 81°00′29″W	Daytona Beach	
49	Meyer–Davis House–Hasty Cottage	Meyer–Davis House–Hasty Cottage	November 16, 2015 (#15000786)	143 Beach St. 29°04′57″N 80°56′02″W	Ponce Inlet	
50	Moulton–Wells House	Moulton–Wells House	November 21, 2001 (#01001247)	West of Eldora Road on the Canaveral National Seashore; 28°54′32″N 80°49′16″W	New Smyrna Beach	
51	Mount Taylor		October 8, 1997 (#97001219)	Address Restricted	DeBary	
52	New Smyrna Beach Historic District	New Smyrna Beach Historic District	April 26, 1990 (#90000714)	Roughly bounded by Riverside Drive, U.S. Route 1, Ronnoc Lane, and Smith Street; 29°01′30″N 80°55′27″W	New Smyrna Beach	
53	New Smyrna Sugar Mill Ruins	New Smyrna Sugar Mill Ruins	August 12, 1970 (#70000192)	600 Old Mission Road; 29°00′34″N 80°56′25″W	New Smyrna Beach	
54	Nocoroco	Nocoroco	May 7, 1973 (#73000605)	2 miles north of Ormond Beach; 29°21′07″N 81°05′14″W	Ormond Beach	
55	Old DeLand Memorial Hospital	Old DeLand Memorial Hospital	November 27, 1989 (#89002030)	Stone Street; 29°02′37″N 81°19′03″W	DeLand	
56	Old Fort Park Archeological Site	Old Fort Park Archeological Site	July 10, 2008 (#08000629)	Address Restricted; 29°01′38″N 80°55′20″W	New Smyrna Beach	Part of the Archeological Resources of the 18th-Century Smyrnea Settlement of Dr. Andrew Turnbull MPS
57	Old Stone Wharf Archeological Site	Old Stone Wharf Archeological Site	July 10, 2008 (#08000638)	Address Restricted; 29°01′11″N 80°55′07″W	New Smyrna Beach	Part of the Archeological Resources of the 18th-Century Smyrnea Settlement of Dr. Andrew Turnbull MPS
58	Olds Hall	Olds Hall	September 23, 1993 (#93001003)	340 South Ridgewood Avenue; 29°12′18″N 81°01′13″W	Daytona Beach	
59	Orange City Colored School	Orange City Colored School	August 1, 2003 (#03000703)	200 East Blue Springs Avenue; 28°56′19″N 81°17′49″W	Orange City	Part of the Florida's Historic Black Public Schools MPS
60	Orange City Historic District	Orange City Historic District	April 6, 2004 (#04000265)	Roughly Banana, Carpenter, French and Orange Avenues; 28°56′56″N 81°17′57″W	Orange City	Part of the Orange City, Florida MPS
61	Orange City Town Hall	Orange City Town Hall	May 16, 2002 (#02000493)	205 East Graves Avenue; 28°56′56″N 81°17′52″W	Orange City	
62	Ormond Fire House	Ormond Fire House	December 15, 2010 (#10001033)	160 East Granada Boulevard; 29°17′27″N 81°02′32″W	Ormond Beach	
63	Ormond Yacht Club	Ormond Yacht Club	April 19, 2005 (#05000310)	63 North Beach Street; 29°17′16″N 81°03′21″W	Ormond Beach	
64	Pacetti Hotel		November 23, 2020 (#100005822)	4928 South Peninsula Dr. 29°04′51″N 80°55′45″W	Ponce Inlet	
65	Ponce De Leon Inlet Lightstation	Ponce De Leon Inlet Lightstation	September 22, 1972 (#72000355)	4931 South Peninsula Drive, U.S. Coast Guard Reservation; 29°04′50″N 80°55′42″W	Ponce Inlet	
66	The Porches	The Porches	October 6, 1988 (#88001715)	176 South Beach Street; 29°16′52″N 81°03′14″W	Ormond Beach	Part of the Historic Winter Residences of Ormond Beach, 1878-1925 MPS
67	Port Orange Florida East Coast Railway Freight Depot	Port Orange Florida East Coast Railway Freight Depot	February 5, 1998 (#98000057)	415C Herbert Street; 29°08′37″N 80°59′36″W	Port Orange	Part of the Port Orange MPS
68	Rogers House	Rogers House	September 11, 1986 (#86002407)	436 North Beach Street; 29°13′09″N 81°00′50″W	Daytona Beach	
69	Ross Hammock Site		February 5, 1981 (#81000083)	Address Restricted	Oak Hill	
70	Rowallan	Rowallan	October 6, 1988 (#88001724)	253 John Anderson Highway; 29°17′36″N 81°02′59″W	Ormond Beach	Part of the Historic Winter Residences of Ormond Beach, 1878-1925 MPS
71	St. Rita's Colored Catholic Mission	St. Rita's Colored Catholic Mission	April 13, 2007 (#07000280)	314 Duss Street; 29°01′27″N 80°55′56″W	New Smyrna Beach	
72	Seabreeze Historic District	Seabreeze Historic District	September 3, 1998 (#98001131)	Roughly bounded by University Boulevard, the Halifax River, Auditorium Boulevard, and North Atlantic Avenue; 29°13′58″N 81°02′34″W	Daytona Beach	Part of the Daytona Beach MPS
73	Seminole Rest	Seminole Rest	March 19, 1997 (#97000231)	East of State Road 5 on the western shore of Mosquito Lagoon at the Canaveral National Seashore; 28°52′11″N 80°50′15″W	Oak Hill	
74	Seybold Baking Company Factory	Seybold Baking Company Factory	October 30, 1997 (#97001283)	800 Orange Avenue; 29°12′09″N 81°01′55″W	Daytona Beach	Part of the Daytona Beach MPS
75	Sleepy Hollow Archeological Site		July 10, 2008 (#08000637)	Address Restricted	New Smyrna Beach	Part of the Archeological Resources of the 18th-Century Smyrnea Settlement of Dr. Andrew Turnbull MPS
76	South Beach Street Historic District	South Beach Street Historic District	September 15, 1988 (#88001597)	Roughly bounded by Volusia Avenue, South Beach Street, South Street, and U.S. Route 1; 29°12′18″N 81°01′03″W	Daytona Beach	
77	South Peninsula Historic District	South Peninsula Historic District	November 19, 1998 (#98001379)	Roughly the Daytona Beach Peninsula between the Atlantic Ocean and the Halifax River; 29°12′37″N 81°00′20″W	Daytona Beach	Part of the Daytona Beach MPS
78	South Ridgewood Elementary School	South Ridgewood Elementary School	July 14, 2011 (#11000436)	747 S. Ridgewood Ave. 29°11′55″N 81°00′56″W	Daytona Beach	
79	Southern Cassadaga Spiritualist Camp Historic District	Southern Cassadaga Spiritualist Camp Historic District	March 14, 1991 (#91000249)	Roughly bounded by Cassadaga Road and Marion, Stevens, Lake, and Chauncey Streets; 28°57′52″N 81°14′14″W	Cassadaga	
80	Southwest Daytona Beach Black Heritage District	Southwest Daytona Beach Black Heritage District	May 23, 1997 (#97000457)	Roughly bounded by Foote Court, South Street, Dr. Martin Luther King Boulevard, and the Florida East Coast railroad tracks 29°12′08″N 81°01′26″W	Daytona Beach	Part of the Daytona Beach MPS
81	Spruce Creek Mound Complex	Spruce Creek Mound Complex	December 3, 1990 (#90001761)	Address Restricted	Port Orange	
82	Stetson University Campus Historic District	Stetson University Campus Historic District	March 14, 1991 (#91000244)	Roughly bounded by Michigan Avenue, North Florida Avenue, West University Avenue, and a line south from North Hayden Avenue; 29°02′06″N 81°18′13″W	DeLand	
83	John B. Stetson House	John B. Stetson House	November 21, 1978 (#78000957)	1031 Camphor Lane; 29°01′24″N 81°19′25″W	DeLand	
84	Ann Stevens House	Ann Stevens House	August 18, 1993 (#93000734)	201 East Kicklighter Road; 28°58′10″N 81°14′00″W	Lake Helen	Part of the Lake Helen MPS
85	Stockton-Lindquist House	Stockton-Lindquist House	June 22, 2004 (#04000626)	244 East Beresford Avenue; 29°00′48″N 81°17′59″W	DeLand	
86	Strawn Historic Citrus Packing House District	Strawn Historic Citrus Packing House District	September 13, 1993 (#93000931)	5707 Lake Winona Road; 29°08′18″N 81°21′35″W	DeLeon Springs	Part of the Citrus Industry Resources of Theodore Strawn, Inc., MPS
87	Strawn Historic Sawmill District	Strawn Historic Sawmill District	September 13, 1993 (#93000930)	5710 Lake Winona Road; 29°08′21″N 81°21′38″W	DeLeon Springs	Part of the Citrus Industry Resources of Theodore Strawn, Inc., MPS
88	Talahloka	Talahloka	September 6, 1989 (#88001716)	19 Orchard Lane; 29°17′26″N 81°02′53″W	Ormond Beach	Part of the Historic Winter Residences of Ormond Beach, 1878-1925 MPS
89	Tarragona Tower	Tarragona Tower	May 6, 2005 (#05000368)	Tarragona Way and International Speedway Boulevard; 29°12′00″N 81°02′49″W	Daytona Beach	
90	Three Chimneys Archaeological Site	Three Chimneys Archaeological Site	September 16, 2010 (#10000757)	715 West Granada Boulevard; 29°16′41″N 81°04′26″W	Ormond Beach	
91	Howard Thurman House	Howard Thurman House	February 23, 1990 (#90000100)	614 Whitehall Street; 29°11′54″N 81°01′19″W	Daytona Beach	Home of educator and civil rights leader Howard Thurman
92	Louis P. Thursby House	Louis P. Thursby House	May 11, 2000 (#00000468)	Located inside Blue Spring State Park; 28°56′41″N 81°20′21″W	Orange City	
93	Tomoka Mound and Midden Complex		November 27, 2020 (#100005821)	Address Restricted	Ormond Beach	
94	Tourist Church	Tourist Church	October 6, 1995 (#95001139)	501 North Wild Olive Avenue; 29°13′59″N 81°00′52″W	Daytona Beach	
95	Turnbull Canal System	Turnbull Canal System	August 24, 2007 (#07000840)	Address Restricted	New Smyrna Beach	Part of the Archeological Resources of the 18th-Century Smyrnea Settlement of Dr. Andrew Turnbull MPS
96	Turnbull Colonists' House Archeological Site	Turnbull Colonists' House Archeological Site	July 10, 2008 (#08000632)	1919 North Dixie Freeway; 29°03′17″N 80°56′23″W	New Smyrna Beach	Part of the Archeological Resources of the 18th-Century Smyrnea Settlement of Dr. Andrew Turnbull MPS
97	Turnbull Colonists' House No. 2 Archeological Site		July 10, 2008 (#08000633)	Address Restricted	New Smyrna Beach	Part of the Archeological Resources of the 18th-Century Smyrnea Settlement of Dr. Andrew Turnbull MPS
98	Turtle Mound	Turtle Mound	September 29, 1970 (#70000193)	Canaveral National Seashore, south of Bethune Beach; 28°55′51″N 80°49′37″W	New Smyrna Beach	
99	US Post Office	US Post Office	June 30, 1988 (#88000974)	220 North Beach Street; 29°12′53″N 81°01′16″W	Daytona Beach	
100	Village Improvement Association Hall	Village Improvement Association Hall	October 7, 2022 (#100008277)	126 East Halifax Ave. 28°51′51″N 80°51′01″W	Oak Hill	
101	West DeLand Residential District	West DeLand Residential District	November 20, 1992 (#92001617)	Roughly bounded by University, Florida, New York and Orange Avenues; 29°01′57″N 81°18′37″W	DeLand	
102	White–Fox House Archeological Site		July 10, 2008 (#08000634)	Address Restricted	New Smyrna Beach	Part of the Archeological Resources of the 18th-Century Smyrnea Settlement of Dr. Andrew Turnbull MPS
103	White Hall	White Hall	July 15, 1992 (#92000849)	640 Dr. Mary McLeod Bethune Boulevard; 29°12′43″N 81°01′57″W	Daytona Beach	
104	Woman's Club of New Smyrna	Woman's Club of New Smyrna	May 11, 1989 (#89000410)	403 Magnolia Street; 29°01′20″N 80°55′16″W	New Smyrna Beach	
105	James W. Wright Building	James W. Wright Building	February 1, 2021 (#100006120)	258 West Voorhis Ave. 29°01′28″N 81°18′26″W	DeLand	
106	S. Cornelia Young Memorial Library	S. Cornelia Young Memorial Library	June 25, 1992 (#92000823)	302 Vermont Avenue; 29°13′10″N 81°00′36″W	Daytona Beach	

== Former listings ==
	Name on the Register	Image	Date listed	Date removed	Location	City or town	Description
1	John Anderson Lodge	John Anderson Lodge	September 6, 1989 (#88001717)	August 22, 2023	71 Orchard Lane; 29°17′26″N 81°02′50″W	Ormond Beach	Part of the Historic Winter Residences of Ormond Beach, 1878-1925 MPS
2	Halifax Drive Historic District	Halifax Drive Historic District	February 5, 1998 (#98000056)	January 29, 2009	Roughly along Halifax Drive from Dunlawton to Herbert Street; 29°08′37″N 80°59′11″W	Port Orange	Part of the Port Orange MPS
3	Ormond Garage	Ormond Garage	September 29, 1970 (#76002284)	January 19, 1976	79 E. Granada	Ormond Beach	Destroyed by fire in 1976.
4	Ormond Hotel	Ormond Hotel	November 24, 1980 (#80000964)	September 12, 2025	15 East Granada Boulevard; 29°17′22″N 81°02′50″W	Ormond Beach	Demolished in 1992, only hotel's cupola preserved in nearby park
5	Strawn Historic Agricultural District	Strawn Historic Agricultural District	September 13, 1993 (#93000929)	April 8, 2026	Bounded by Broderick and Retta Streets and by Central and Dundee Avenues; 29°06′56″N 81°20′56″W	DeLeon Springs	Part of the Citrus Industry Resources of Theodore Strawn, Inc., MPS

== See also ==
- List of National Historic Landmarks in Florida
- National Register of Historic Places listings in Florida
