= Archeological Resources of the 18th-Century Smyrnea Settlement of Dr. Andrew Turnbull MPS =

- U.S. National Register of Historic Places
- Location within Florida Location within the United States
- Location: Volusia County, Florida
- Coordinates: 29.030556°N 80.925278°W
- MPS: Archeological Resources of the 18th-Century Smyrnea Settlement of Dr. Andrew Turnbull
- NRHP reference No.: 64500988

The following buildings and structures were added to the National Register of Historic Places as part of the Archeological Resources of the 18th-Century Smyrnea Settlement of Dr. Andrew Turnbull MPS (or MPS).

	Landmark name	Image	Date listed	Location	City or Town	Summary
1	Airport Clear Zone Archeological Site		2008-07-10	Address Restricted	New Smyrna Beach	
2	Blanchette Archeological Site		2008-07-10	Address Restricted	New Smyrna Beach	
3	First Presbyterian Church Archeological Site		2008-07-10	Address Restricted	New Smyrna Beach	
4	Grange Archeological Site		2008-07-10	Address Restricted	New Smyrna Beach	
5	Hawks Archeological Site		2008-07-10	Address Restricted	Edgewater	
6	Janet's Archeological Site		2008-07-10	Address Restricted	New Smyrna Beach	
7	Old Fort Park Archeological Site		2008-07-10	Address Restricted	New Smyrna Beach	
8	Old Stone Wharf Archeological Site		2008-07-10	Address Restricted	New Smyrna Beach	
9	Sleepy Hollow Archeological Site		2008-07-10	Address Restricted	New Smyrna Beach	
10	Turnbull Canal System		2007-08-24	Address Restricted	New Smyrna Beach	
11	Turnbull Colonists' House Archeological Site		2008-07-10	1919 North Dixie Freeway; 29°3′17″N 80°56′23″W	New Smyrna Beach	
12	Turnbull Colonists' House No. 2 Archeological Site		2008-07-10	Address Restricted	New Smyrna Beach	
13	White-Fox House Archeological Site		2008-07-10	Address Restricted	New Smyrna Beach	
