= Three Chimneys (disambiguation) =

Three Chimneys is a historic house in Virginia, United States.

Three Chimneys may also refer to:

- Three Chimneys Archaeological Site, remains of sugar-processing plant in Florida, United States
- Three Chimneys Farm, stud farm in Kentucky, United States
- Three Chimneys, Kent, hamlet in Kent, England
- The Three Chimneys, restaurant in Skye, Scotland
- The Three Chimneys (Tuolumne County, California), landform in California
