= Agricultural Museum =

Agricultural Museum may refer to:

- Agricultural museum, the institution where agricultural artifacts are displayed.

It may also refer to:

- Agricultural Museum (periodical), an American agricultural magazine
- Adatepe Olive Oil Museum, Turkey
- Agricultural Museum, Egypt
- Agricultural Museum (Malaysia)
- Canada Agriculture Museum
- Florida Agricultural Museum, USA
- Irish Agricultural Museum
- Manitoba Agricultural Museum, Canada
- New Jersey Museum of Agriculture, USA
- Tennessee Agricultural Museum, USA
