= New Smyrna Museum of History =

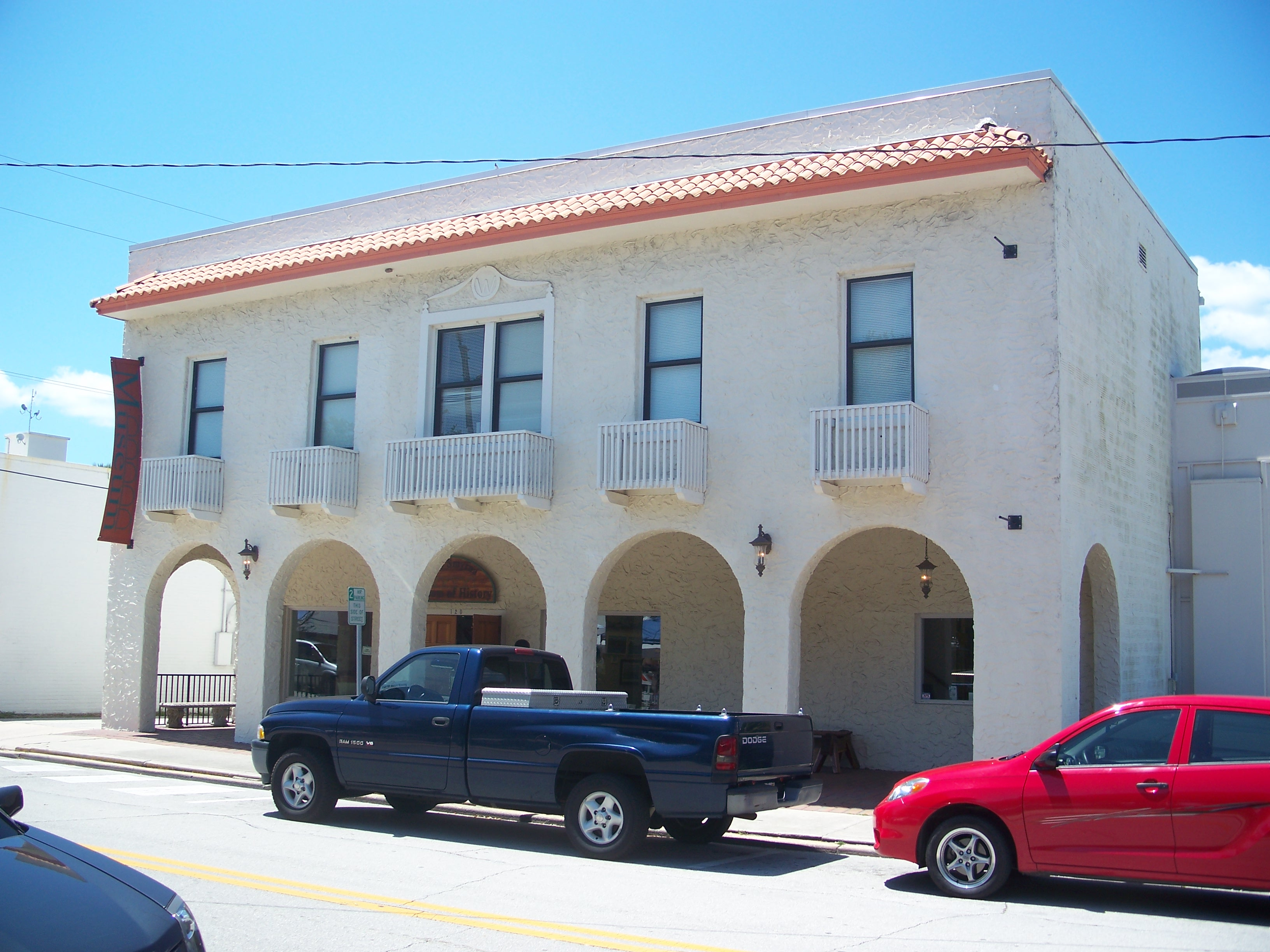

- Location within Volusia County
- Established: 2003
- Location: 120 Sams Avenue; New Smyrna Beach, Florida
- Coordinates: 29.02562°N 80.92250°W
- Type: History museum
- Website: New Smyrna Museum of History

The New Smyrna Museum of History is located at 120 Sams Avenue, New Smyrna Beach, Florida, in the New Smyrna Beach Historic District. It contains exhibits depicting the history of New Smyrna Beach. The building itself was constructed in 1923 as the local post office. It later housed the administrative office of New Smyrna Beach Utilities. The city gave the building to the Southeast Volusia Historical Society in 2002, and it opened as a museum the following year.

== Gallery ==
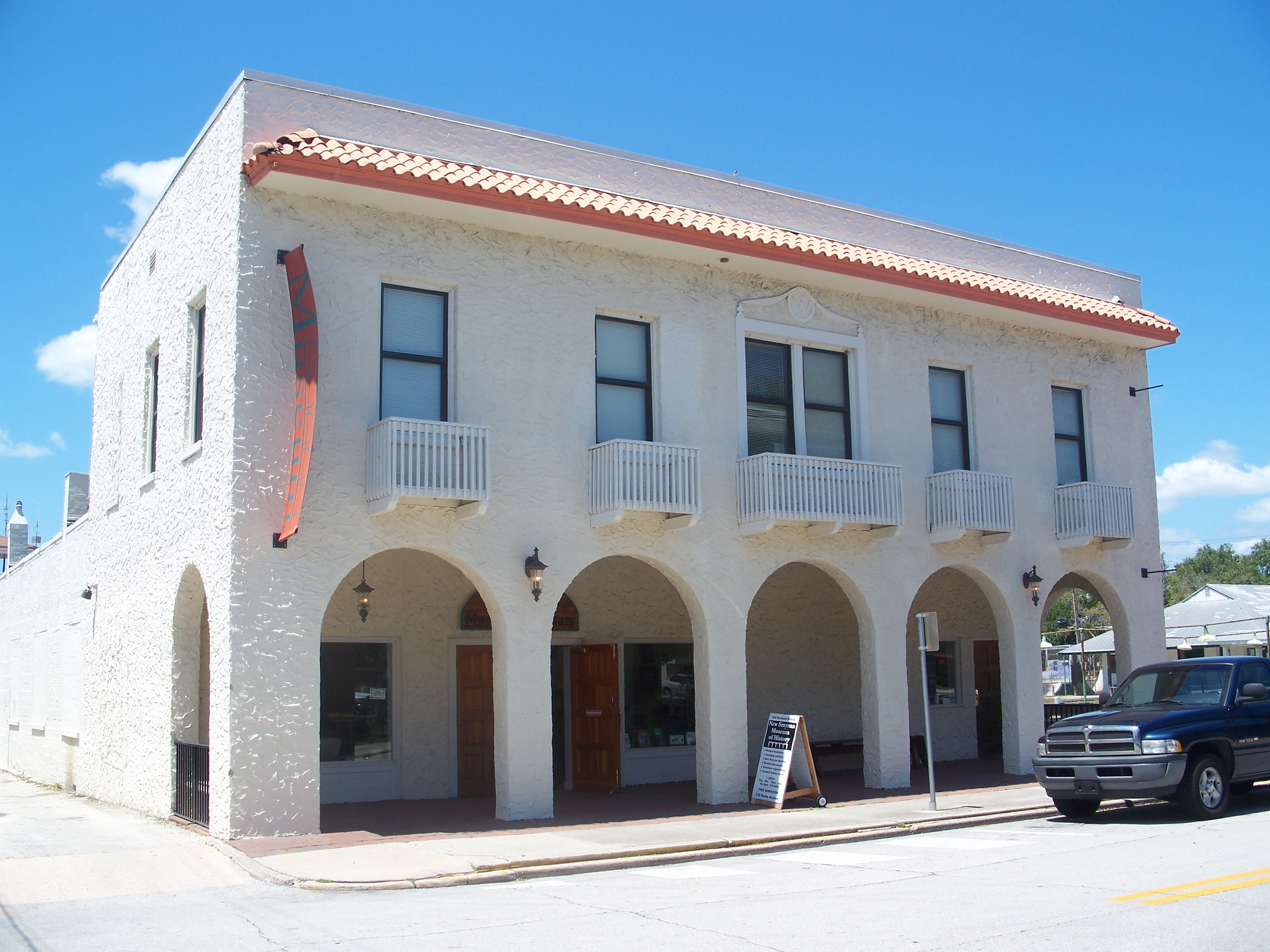

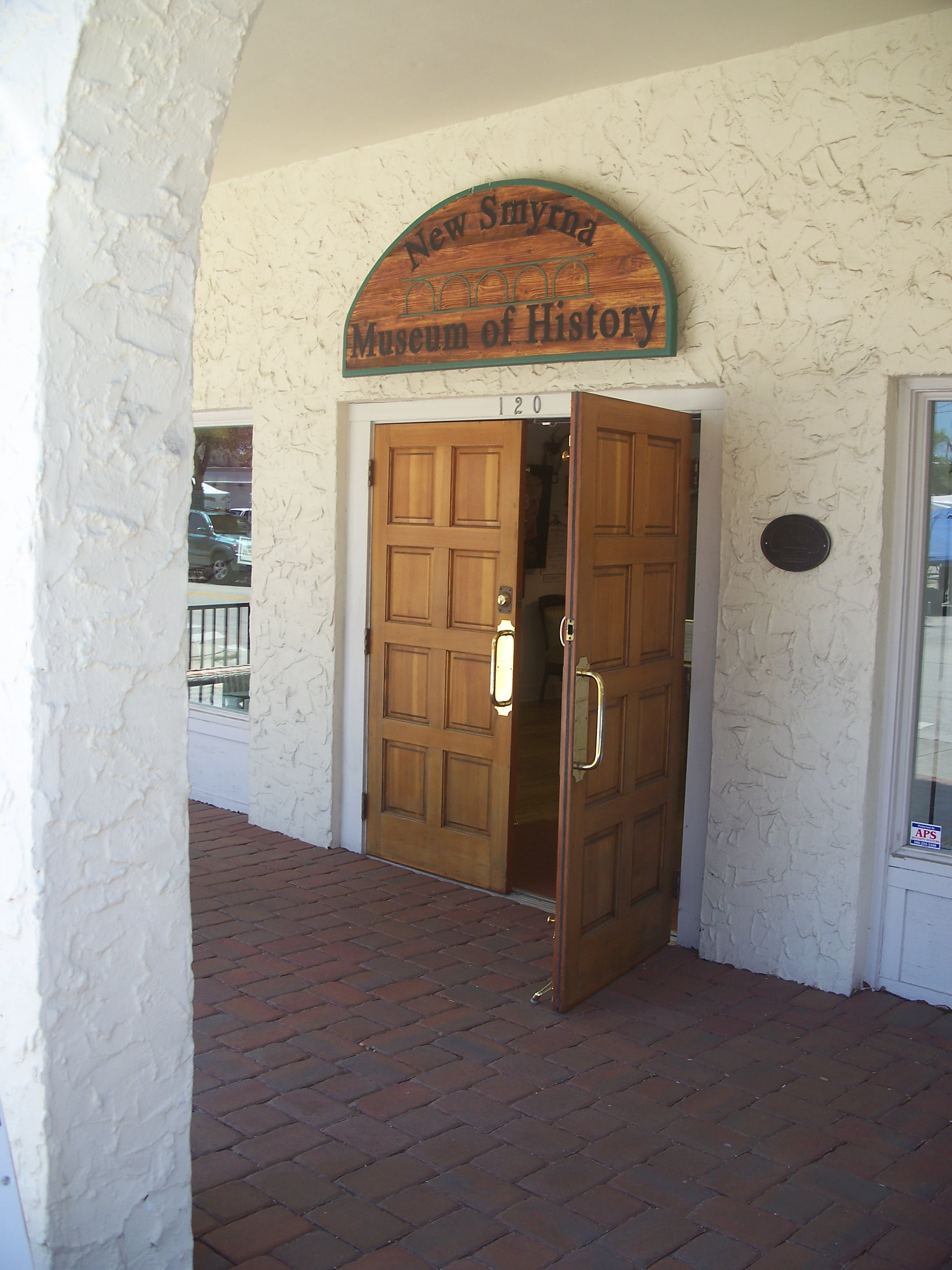
Entrance
