= Ormond Fire House =

- U.S. National Register of Historic Places
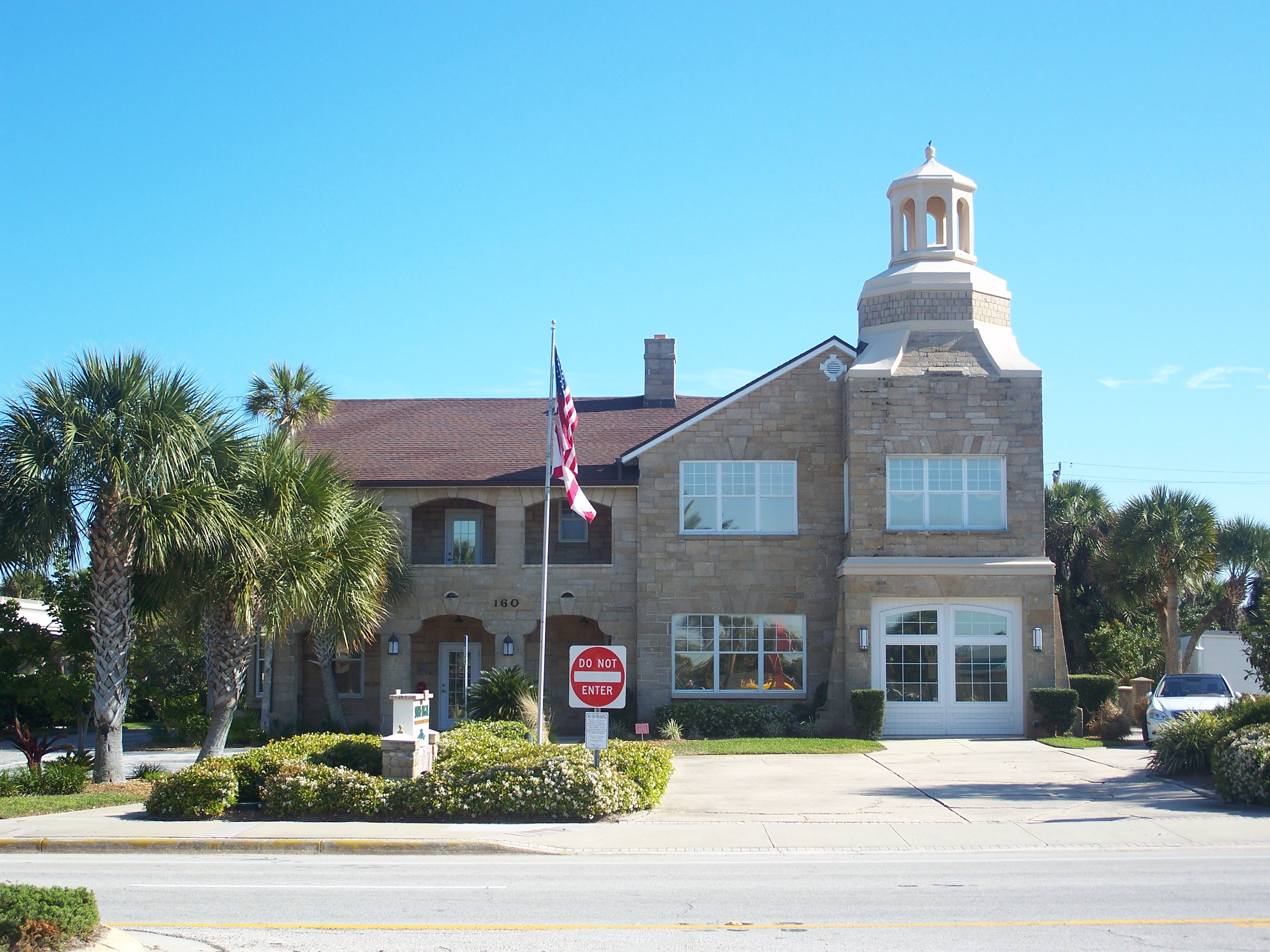
- Ormond Fire House

- Location within Florida
- Location: 160 East Granada Boulevard; Ormond Beach, Florida
- Coordinates: 29°17′27″N 81°02′32″W
- Built: 1937
- Architectural style: Spanish Colonial Revival
- NRHP reference No.: 10001033
- Added to NRHP: December 15, 2010

The Ormond Fire House is a historic building located at 160 East Granada Boulevard in Ormond Beach, Florida. It was added to the National Register of Historic Places on December 15, 2010.

== See also ==
- National Register of Historic Places listings in Volusia County, Florida
