= Florida Agricultural Museum =

Museum in Florida, US

Coordinates: 29.64307°N 81.28066°W

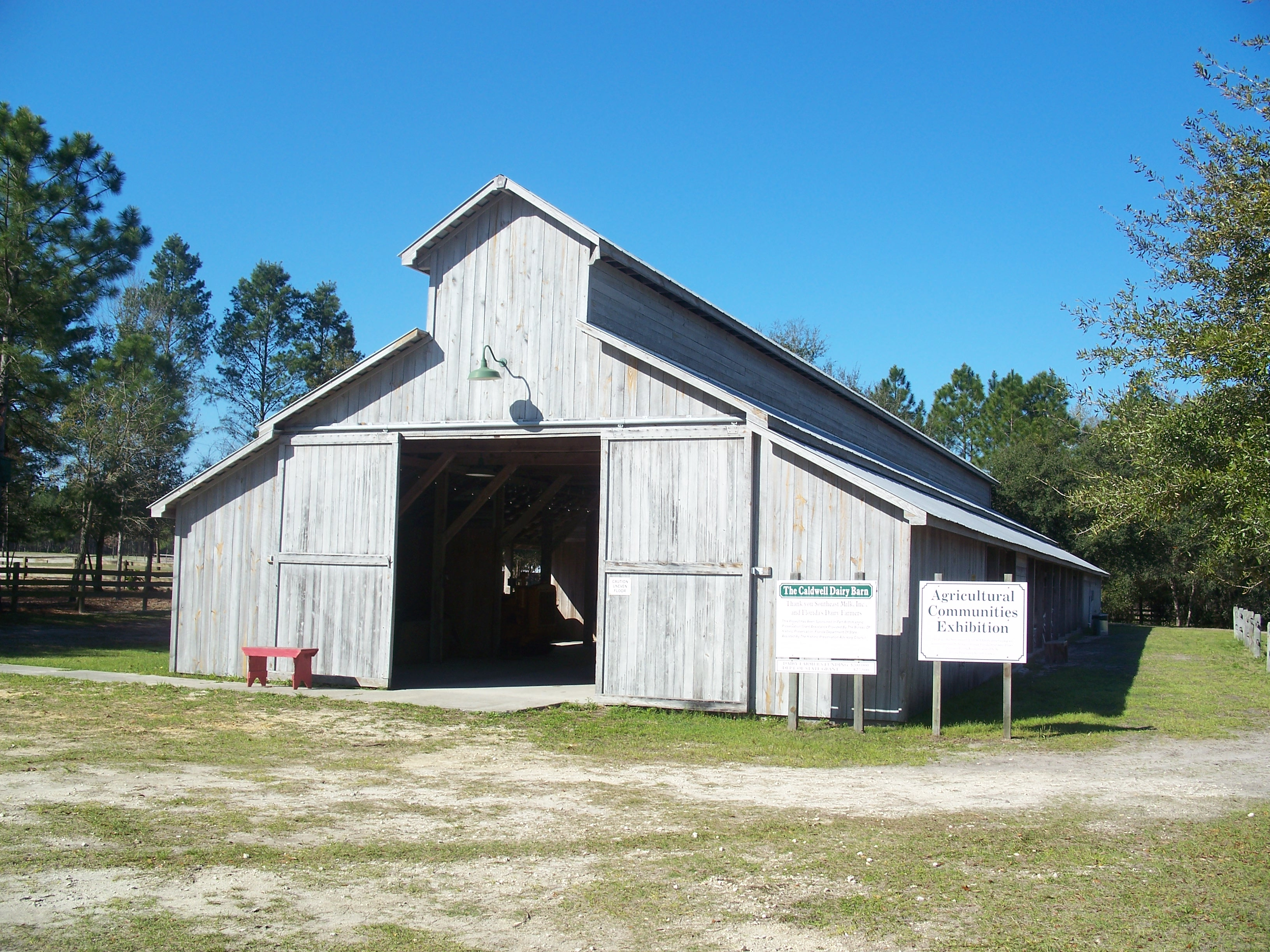
Florida Agricultural Museum Caldwell Dairy Barn built by J.U. Lee

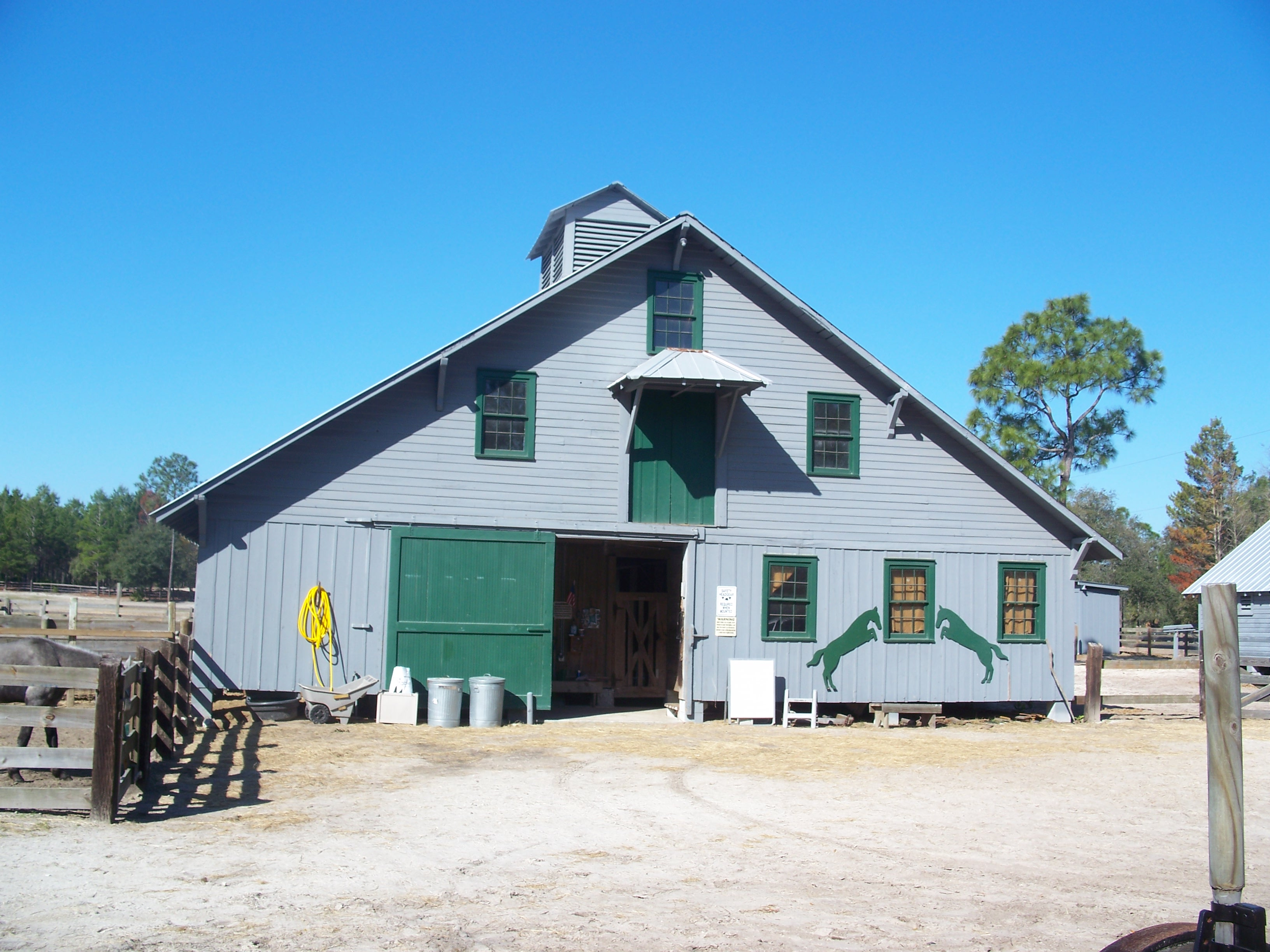
Florida Agricultural Museum building relocated from the Strawn Historic Agricultural District

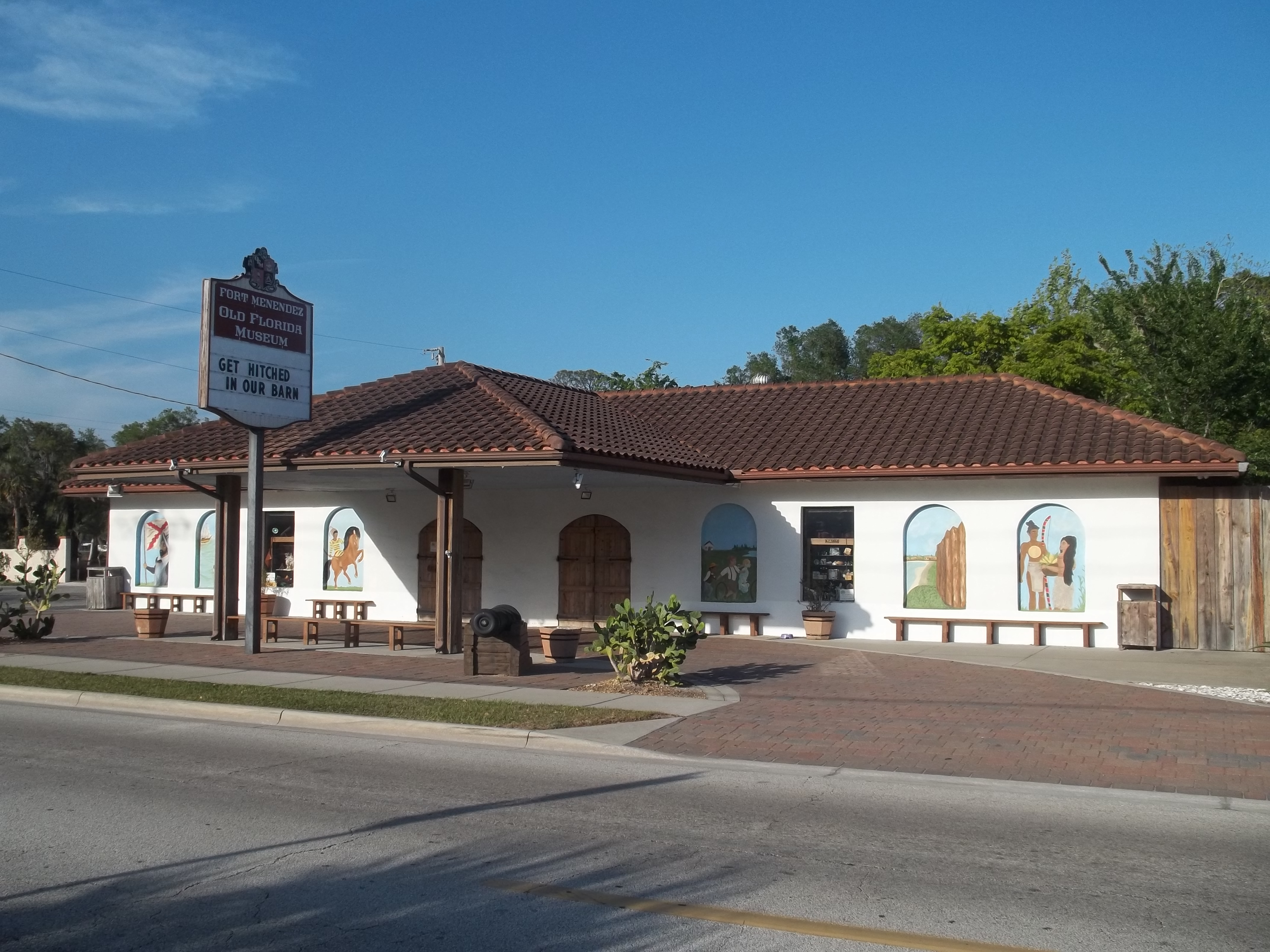
Old Florida Museum

The Florida Agricultural Museum is located in Palm Coast in Flagler County, Florida, United States. The museum includes a restored 1890s pioneer homestead, an early 20th century dry goods store, five restored buildings from a 1930s Great Depression-era citrus operation and a 5,000-square-foot (460 m2) dairy barn. The museum also offers opportunity for horseback trail rides. The Florida Agricultural Museum is located at 7900 Old Kings Road.

The Old Florida Museum is a living history museum in that is currently housed within the Florida Agricultural Museum. It tells the story of Florida's history through a series of exhibits including programming about the Timucua people and Florida Cracker pioneers. Prior to a 2019 move, the museum was housed in the re-creation of a wooden fortress on St. Augustine's San Marcos Avenue where it drew 18,000 students per year. The museum regularly hosts school field trips. In 2023, it hosted its first annual Lost Arts Festival which included blacksmithing, woodworking, canning, and candle dipping.

== See also ==
- List of museums in Florida
