= West DeLand Residential District =

Historic district in Florida, United States

- U.S. National Register of Historic Places
- U.S. Historic district
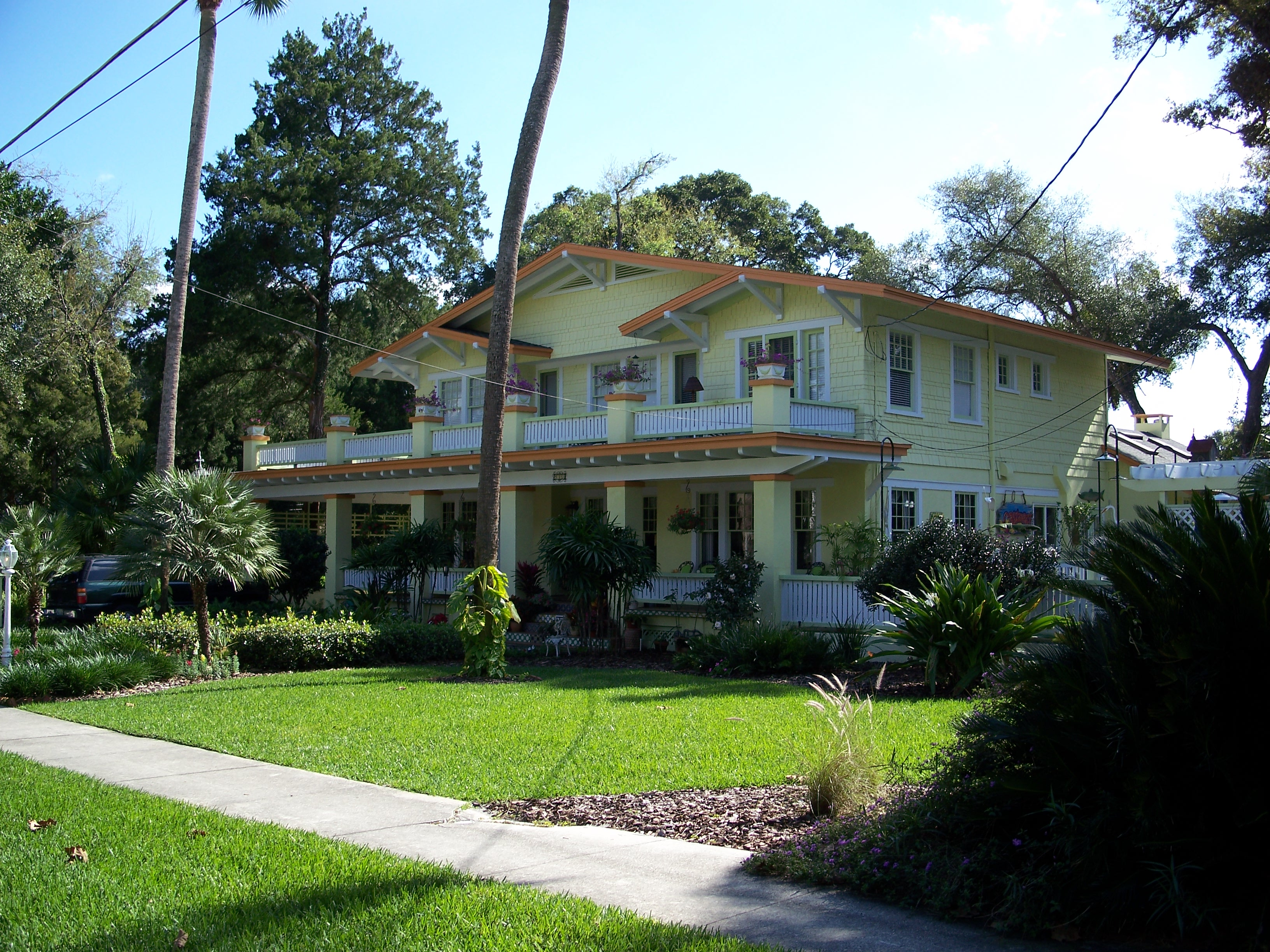
- House in district

- Location within Volusia County
- Location: DeLand, Florida United States
- Coordinates: 29°1′57″N 81°18′37″W
- Area: 1,000 acres (4.0 km^{2})
- NRHP reference No.: 92001617
- Added to NRHP: November 20, 1992

The West DeLand Residential District is a U.S. historic district in DeLand, Florida. It is bounded by University, Florida, New York and Orange Avenues, encompasses approximately 1,000 acres (400 ha), and contains 375 historic buildings. On November 20, 1992, it was added to the U.S. National Register of Historic Places.

== Gallery ==
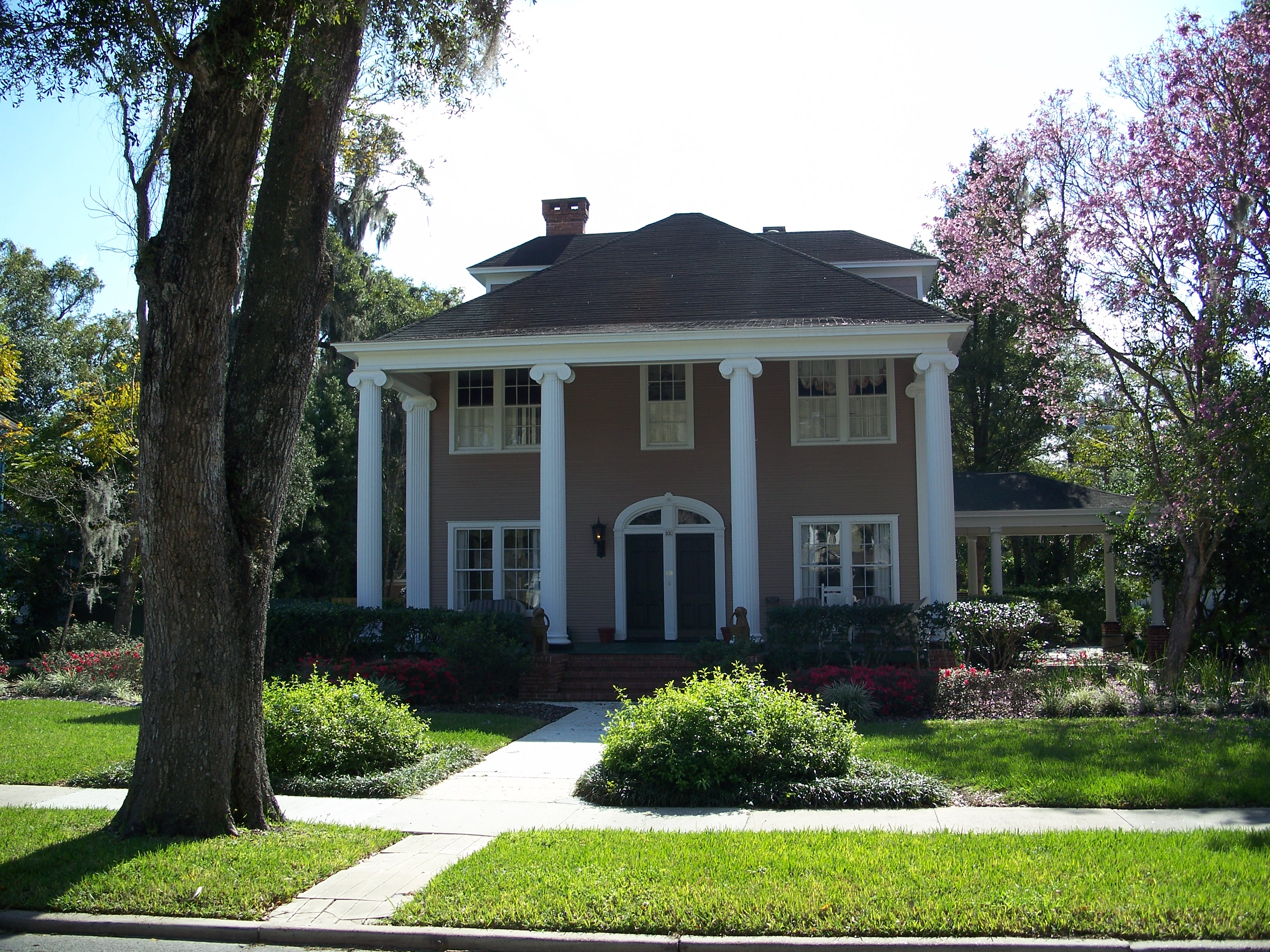
House in district

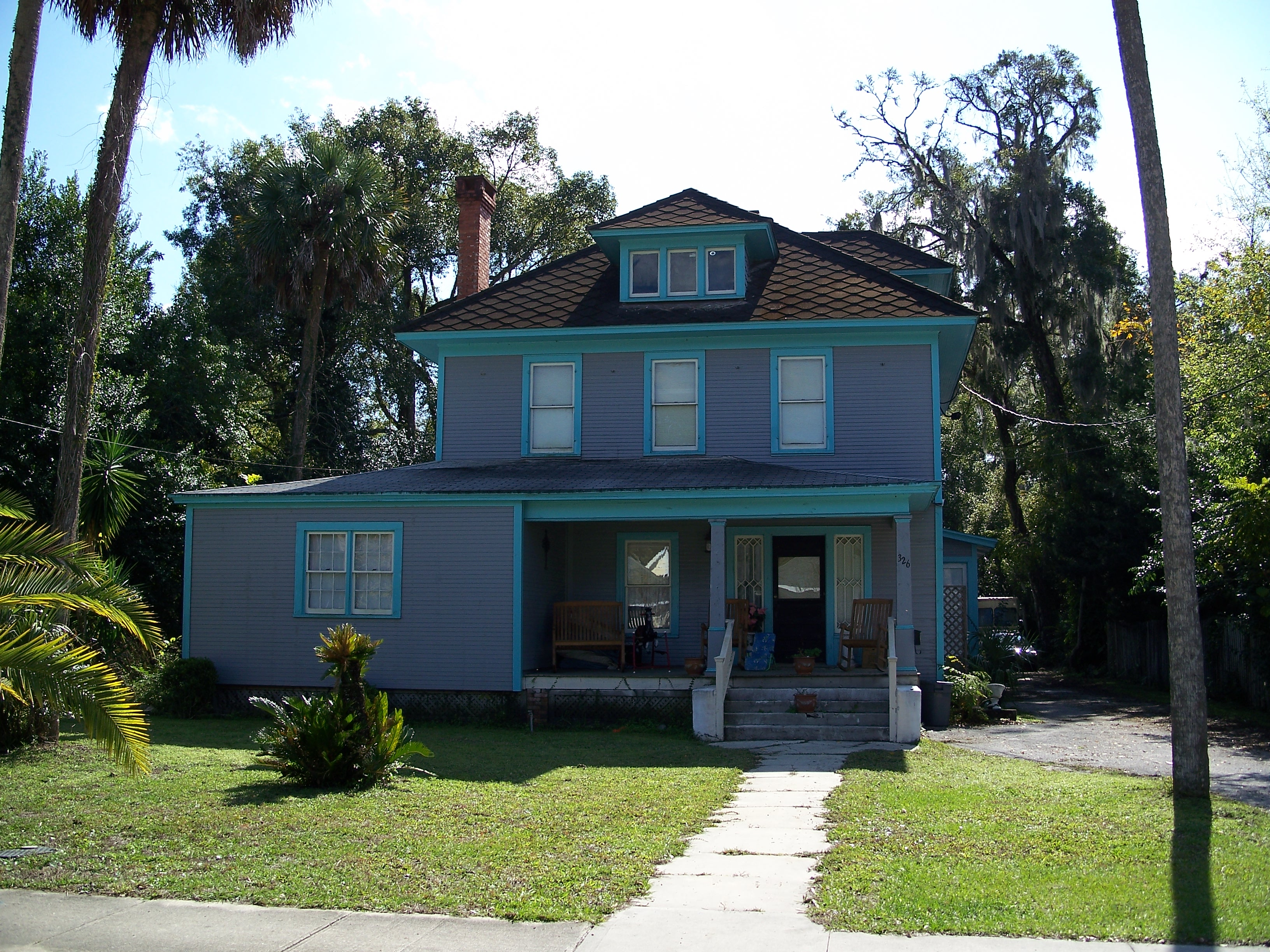
House in district
