= Olds Hall =

- U.S. National Register of Historic Places
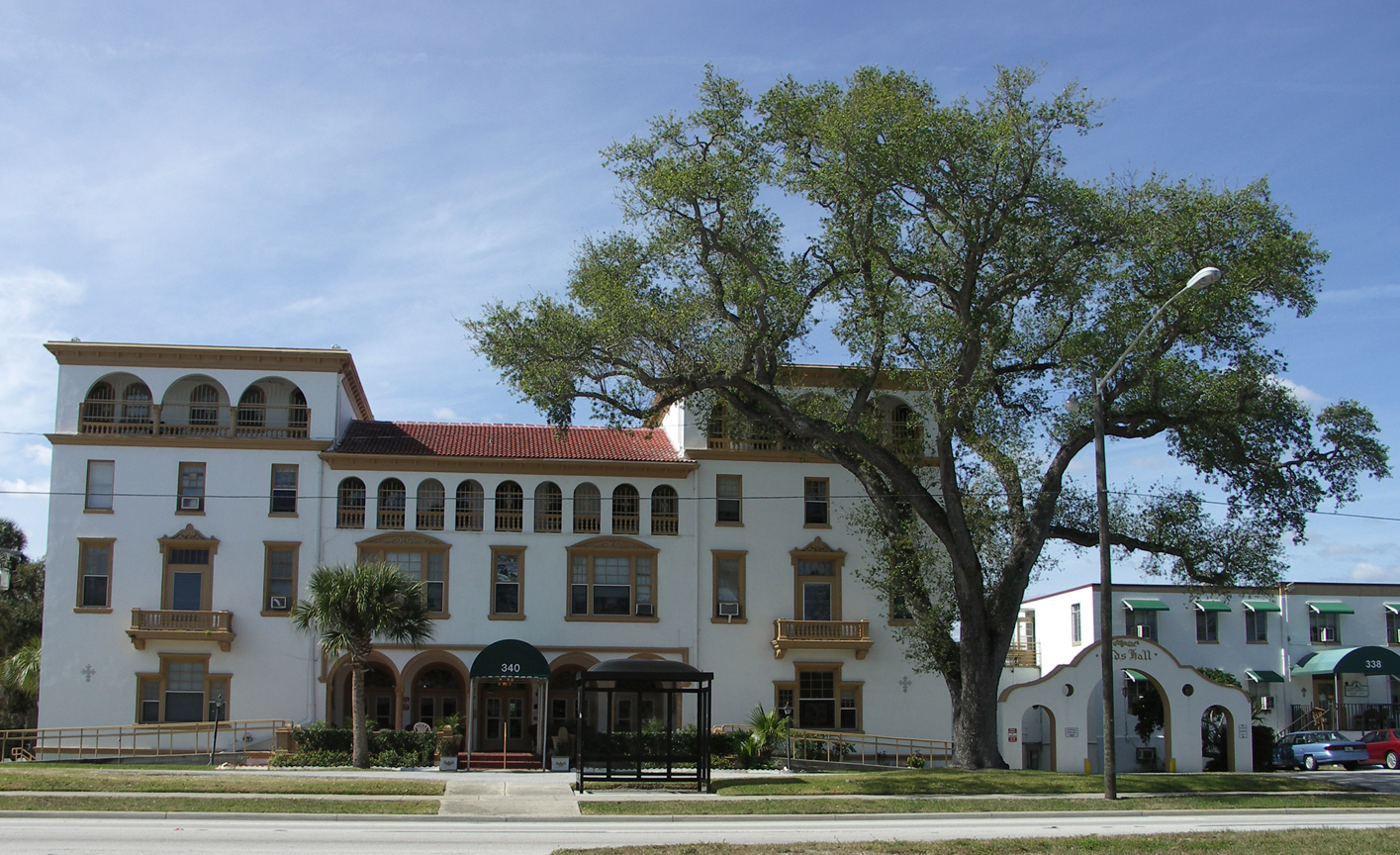

- Location within Volusia County
- Location: Daytona Beach, Florida
- Coordinates: 29°12′18″N 81°1′13″W
- NRHP reference No.: 93001003
- Added to NRHP: September 23, 1993

The Olds Hall (also known as the Arroyo Gardens Hotel or Daytona Terrace Hotel), built in the 1920s, is a historic site in Daytona Beach, Florida, United States. It is located at 340 South Ridgewood Avenue. On September 23, 1993, it was added to the U.S. National Register of Historic Places.

The hall is now the site of the Good Samaritan Society.
