= El Real Retiro =

Historic house in Florida, United States

- U.S. National Register of Historic Places
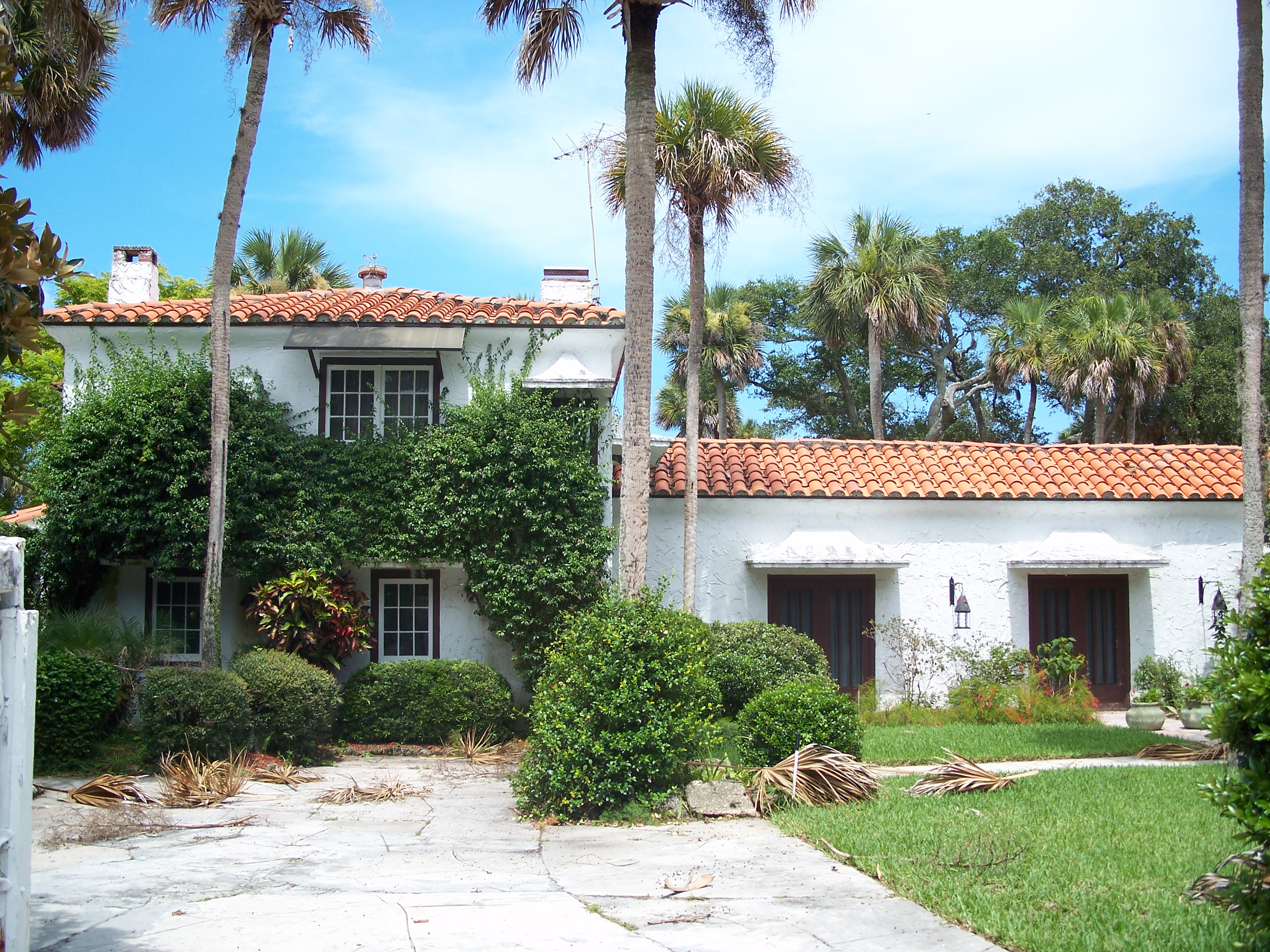

- Location within Florida Location within the United States
- Location: New Smyrna Beach, Florida
- Coordinates: 29°2′4″N 80°55′41″W
- NRHP reference No.: 87001557
- Added to NRHP: November 10, 1987

The El Real Retiro (also known as the Handley House) is a Spanish Colonial Revival house in New Smyrna Beach, Florida, United States. Built in 1923 it is located at 636 North Riverside Drive and 647 Faulkner Street. On November 10, 1987, it was added to the U.S. National Register of Historic Places.

It was built for millionaire stockbroker and art collector Robert Handley; the dining room was painted with murals by artist Robert E. Locher depicting the history of the colonization of Florida.
