= South Ridgewood Elementary School =

- U.S. National Register of Historic Places
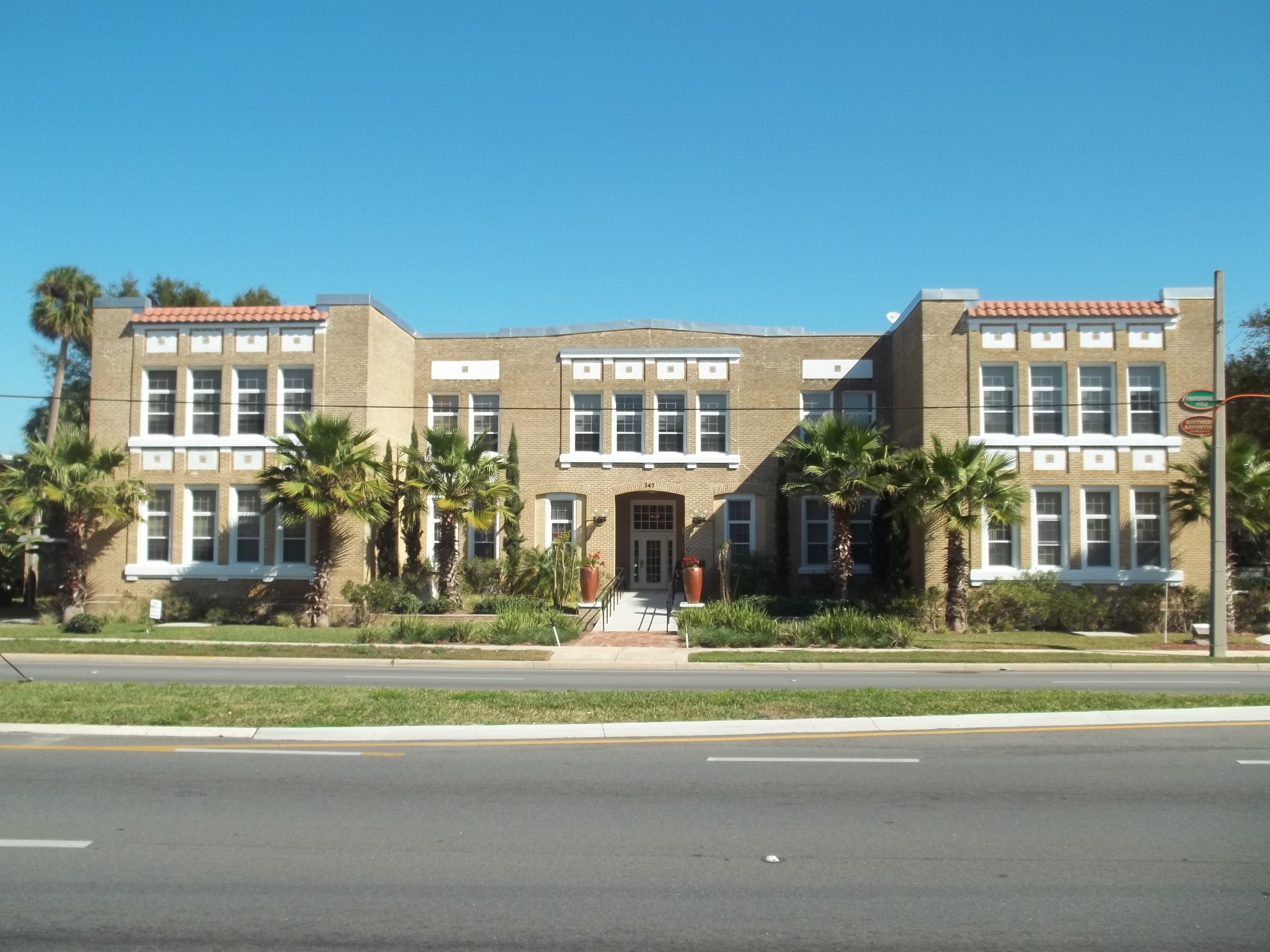

- Location within Florida Location within the United States
- Location: Daytona Beach, Florida
- Coordinates: 29°11′55″N 81°00′56″W
- NRHP reference No.: 11000436
- Added to NRHP: July 14, 2011

South Ridgewood Elementary School is a school building and national historic site located at 747 S. Ridgewood Avenue, Daytona Beach, Florida in Volusia County. Built in 1916, it is the oldest surviving school building in Volusia County and was one of the earliest schools in Daytona Beach. Architects Mark and Sheftall of Jacksonville designed the building, a brick structure with Prairie School features. Local architects Gehlert and Spicer planned an addition to the school in 1956. The school integrated in 1971, making it the first elementary school in Volusia County to do so. The school closed in 1983 and is now an administrative building for the Volusia County School System.

The building was added to the National Register of Historic Places on July 14, 2011.
