= Southern Cassadaga Spiritualist Camp Historic District =

Historic district in Florida, United States

- U.S. National Register of Historic Places
- U.S. Historic district
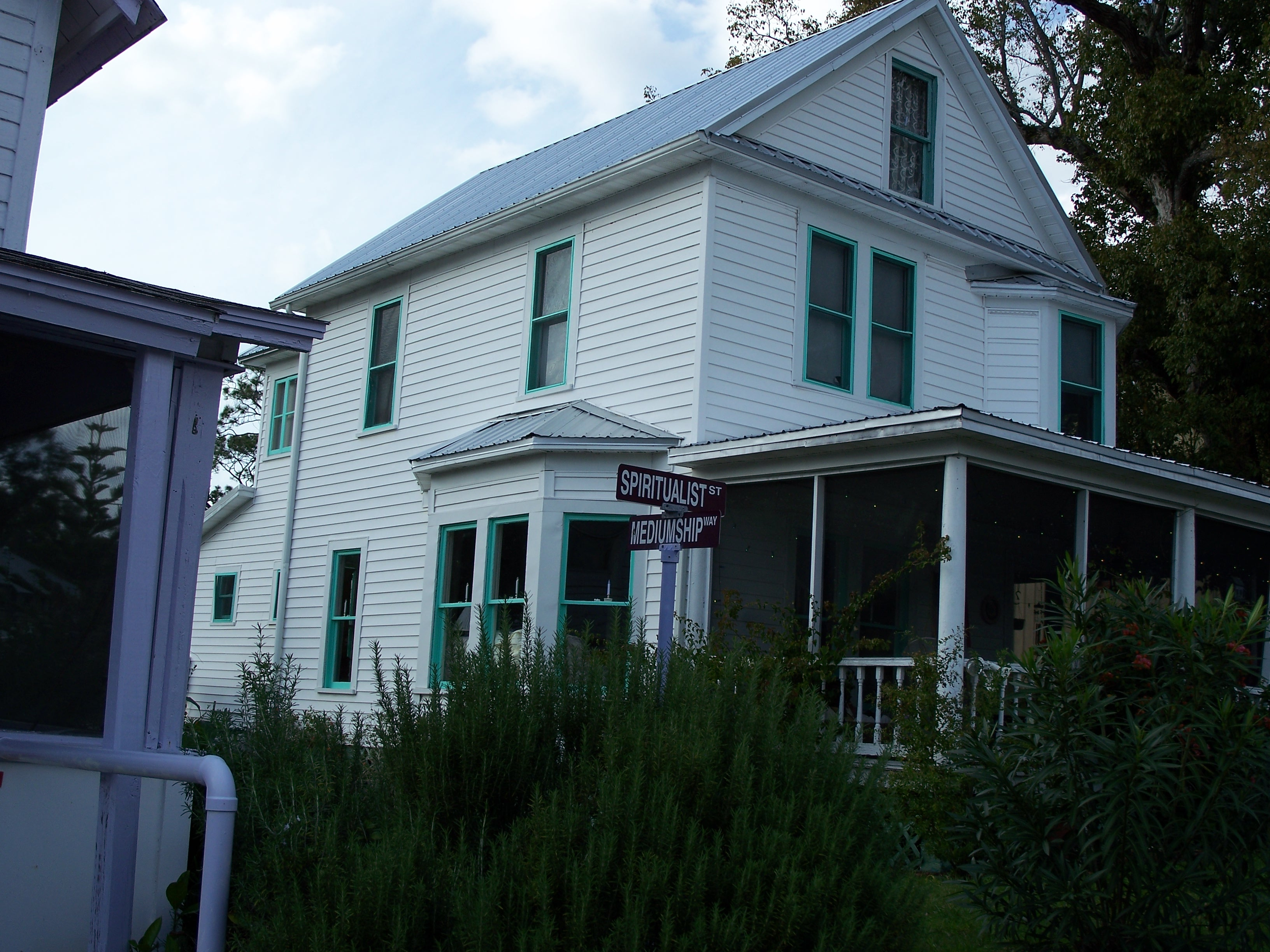
- House at the intersection of Spiritualist Street and Mediumship Way within the district

- Location within Volusia County
- Location: Cassadaga, Florida United States
- Coordinates: 28°57′52″N 81°14′14″W
- Area: 240 acres (0.97 km^{2})
- Built: 1895
- NRHP reference No.: 91000249
- Added to NRHP: March 14, 1991

The Southern Cassadaga Spiritualist Camp Historic District (also known as the town of Cassadaga) is a U.S. historic district (designated as such on March 14, 1991) located in Cassadaga, Florida. The district is bounded by Cassadaga Road and Marion, Stevens, Lake and Chauncey Streets. It contains 65 historic buildings and 2 objects.

== Gallery ==
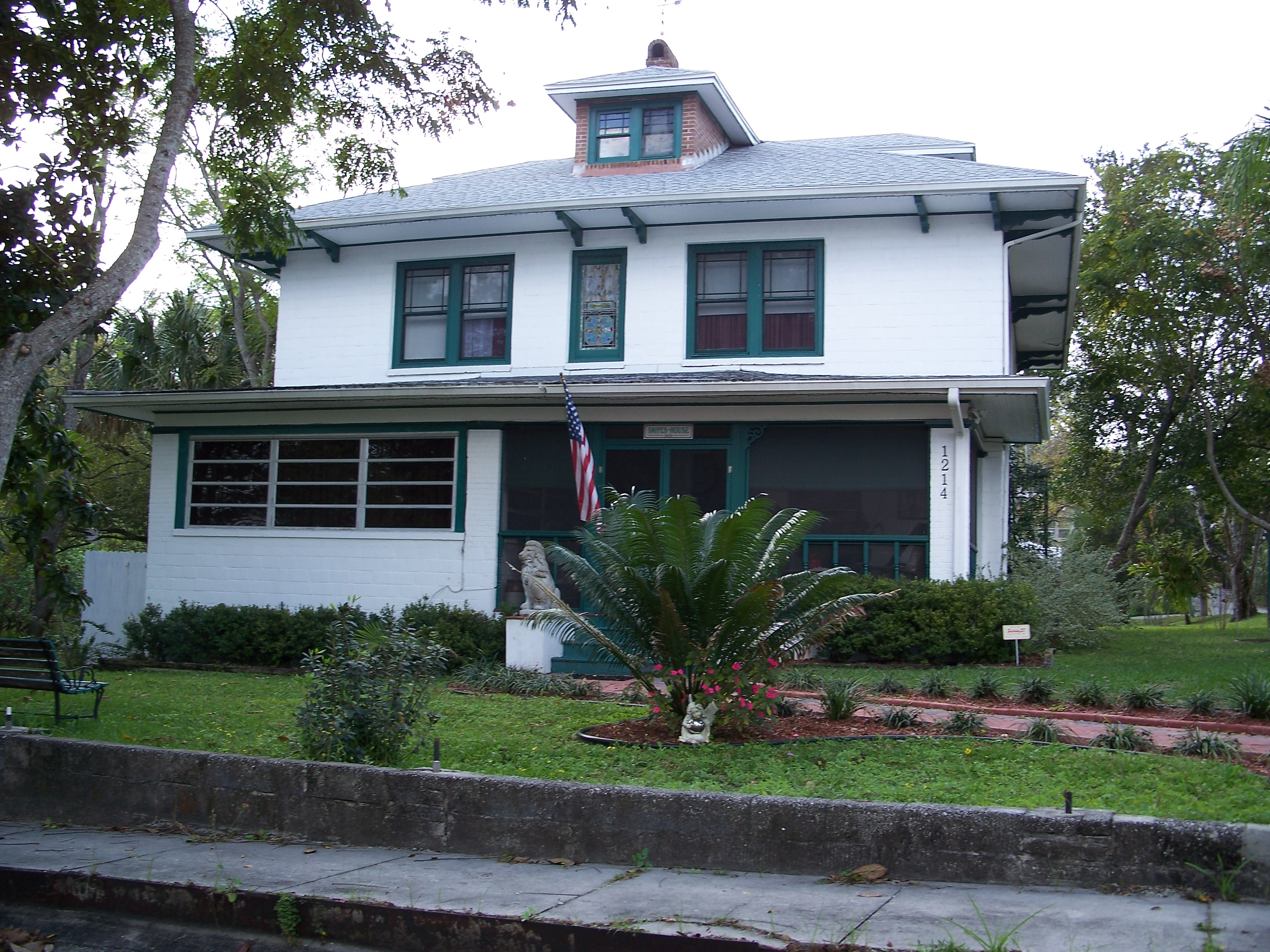
House in district
