= Cassadaga, Florida =

Cassadaga Spiritualist Camp Cassadaga, FL
- Unincorporated community
- Southern Cassadaga Spiritualist Camp Meeting Association
- Nickname: "Psychic Capital of the World"
- Location in Volusia County and the state of Florida
- Coordinates: 28°57′59″N 81°14′09″W
- Country: United States
- State: Florida
- County: Volusia
- Established: 1894
- Founder: George Colby
- Time zone: UTC-5 (EST)
  - Summer (DST): UTC-4 (EDT)
- ZIP code(s): 32706
- Area code: 386
- Website: https://www.cassadaga.org/

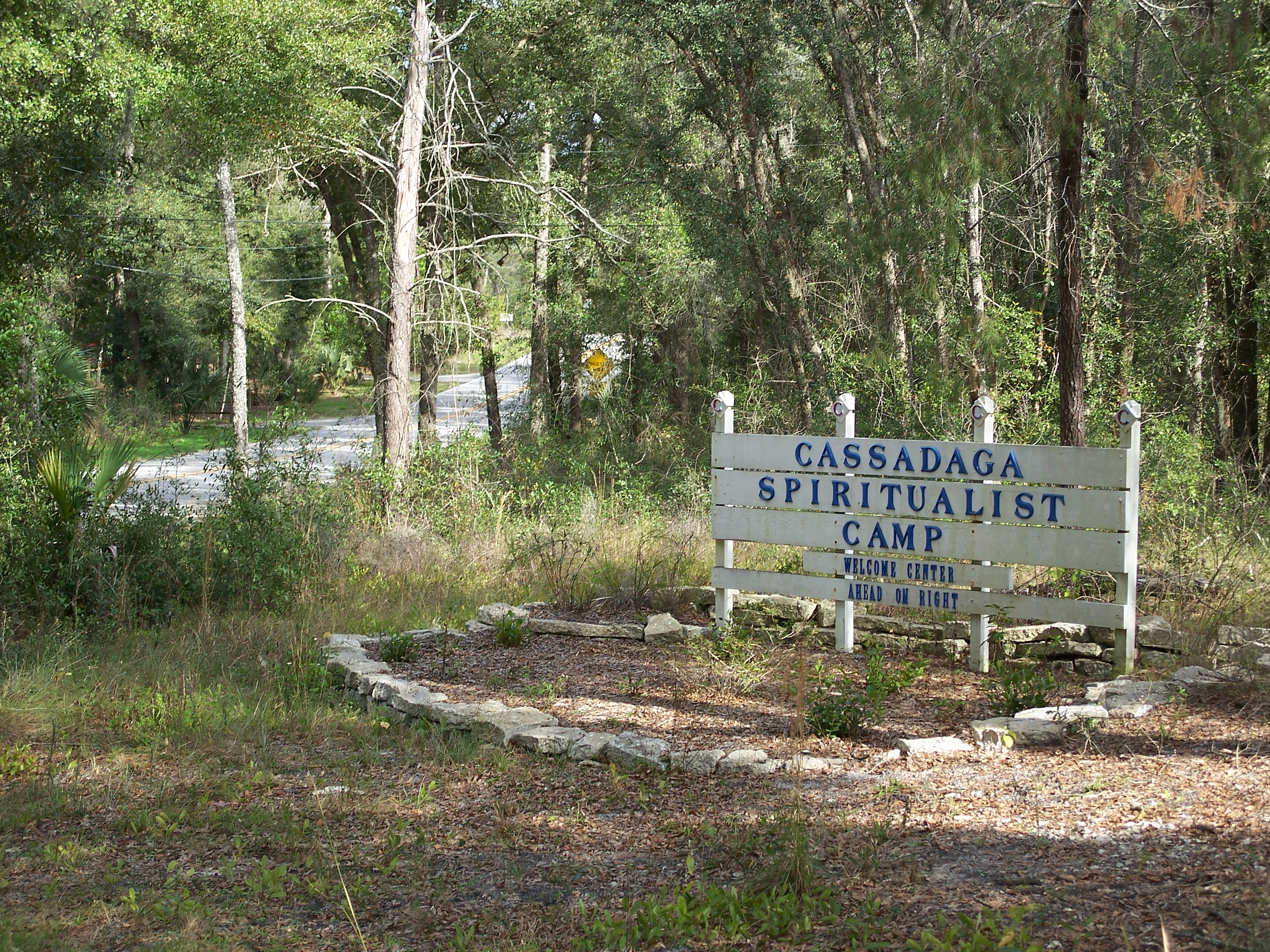
Historic Southern Cassadaga Spiritualist Camp

Cassadaga is a small unincorporated community in Volusia County, Florida, United States. The community is home to the Southern Cassadaga Spiritualist Camp established by members of the Spiritualist movement. Both within and outside the Spiritualist Camp properties, the community is known for having many mediums and psychics, and has consequently been named the "Psychic Capital of the World".

== History ==
The Cassadaga Spiritualist Camp began circa 1875, when the Southern Cassadaga Spiritualist Camp Meeting Association was founded by George P. Colby from Pike, New York, a trance medium who traveled to many different states, giving readings and seances. He was well known and in his travels was referred to as the "seer of spiritualism." Colby attended summer Spiritualist Camp meetings at Lily Dale, New York, the town adjacent to Cassadaga, New York, which would lend its name to the Florida community.

Colby worked with several spirit guides who would give him knowledge. One of his spirit guides was a Native American named Seneca, who had manifested to Colby during a seance in Lake Mills, Iowa. According to Colby, Seneca had instructed him to travel south to Florida, where he eventually arrived at a place called the Blue Springs Landing, near Orange City, Florida. According to Colby, the area that Seneca had led him to was the same area that Colby had seen during the seance in Iowa.

Colby had arrived in Florida in 1875, and on December 18, 1894, the charter was granted to form The Southern Cassadaga Spiritualist Camp Meeting Association. Later, on January 3, 1895, Colby had signed a warranty deed to the association for thirty-five acres. The people who came to the Spiritualist Camp in the early days of its formation were affluent and well educated. The association later received additional acreage that expanded the camp to the current fifty-seven acres.

== Cassadaga Camp today ==
Today, the Camp features the Cassadaga Hotel, a central auditorium, The Colby Memorial Temple, a community library, the Caesar Forman Healing Center, a Camp bookstore, a welcome center, and the Andrew Jackson Davis Educational building, used for musical performances and gatherings. Nearby is Colby-Alderman Park.

The principles of spirituality that are taught by the people at Cassadaga state, "Spiritualism has no dogma or creed, just a simple set of nine principles to help guide our lives". According to the teachings of spiritualism, it is the "science, philosophy, and religion based upon the principle of continuous life". On March 14, 1991, the Southern Cassadaga Spiritualist Camp was declared a U.S. Historic District. The Cassadaga Spiritualist Camp is a federal tax-exempt church currently governed by a board of trustees.

== In popular culture ==
The 2007 album Cassadaga by the band Bright Eyes is named for Cassadaga. The album contains spiritual themes.

== See also ==
- Southern Cassadaga Spiritualist Camp Historic District
- The devil's chair
