= Three Chimneys Archaeological Site =

- U.S. National Register of Historic Places
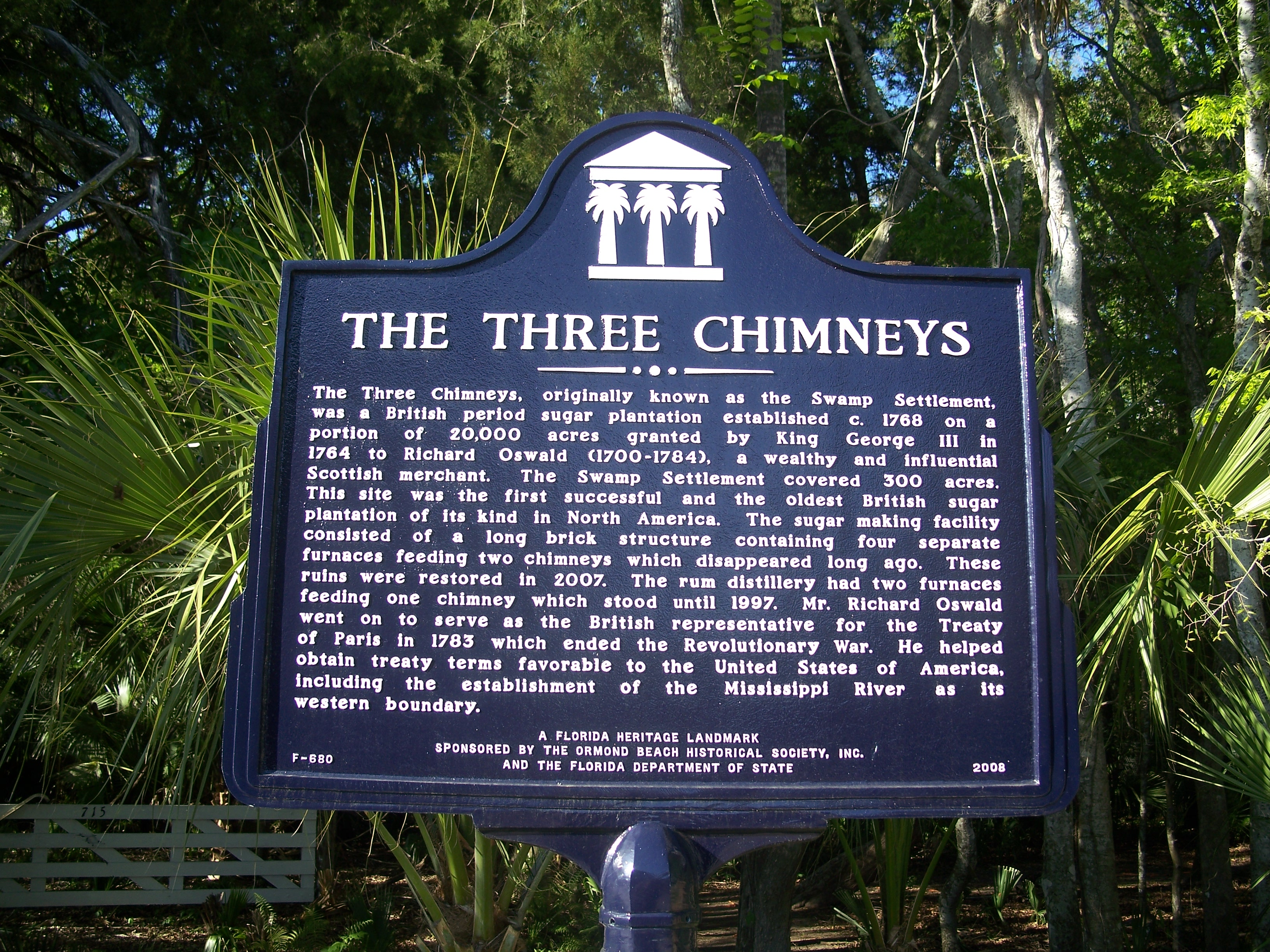
- Historic plaque at the site
- Location: Ormond Beach, Florida United States
- Coordinates: 29°16′45.1″N 81°04′30.5″W
- NRHP reference No.: 10000757
- Added to NRHP: September 16, 2010

Three Chimneys Archaeological Site is located at 715 West Granada Boulevard in Ormond Beach, Florida. The three chimneys within the site were part of a sugar-processing plant owned by Richard Oswald, a wealthy Scottish merchant, who owned a nearby plantation throughout the British rule of Florida. That plantation is now on the grounds of Tomoka State Park. It was listed on the National Register of Historic Places on September 16, 2010.

The site has been excavated.

== See also ==
- National Register of Historic Places listings in Volusia County, Florida
- Tomoka State Park
