= S. Cornelia Young Memorial Library =

- U.S. National Register of Historic Places
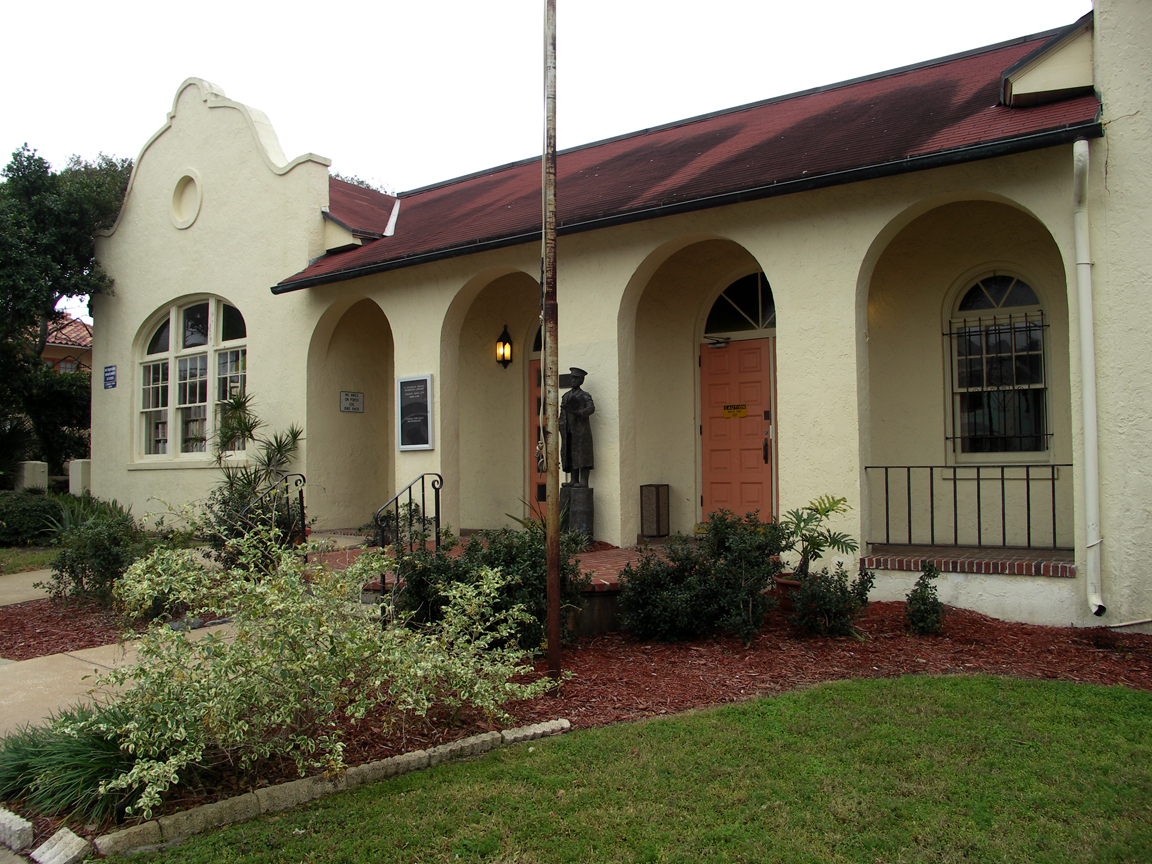

- Location within Volusia County
- Location: Daytona Beach, Florida
- Coordinates: 29°13′10″N 81°0′36″W
- Architectural style: Mission/Spanish Revival
- NRHP reference No.: 92000823
- Added to NRHP: June 25, 1992

The S. Cornelia Young Memorial Library (also known as the Cornelia Young Memorial Library or "Old Corny") is a historic library in Daytona Beach, Florida, United States. It was added to the National Register of Historic Places in 1992.

The S. Cornelia Young Memorial Library closed to the public in spring of 2010 due to budget cutbacks. It was a branch of the Volusia County Public Libraries.
