= Tourist Church =

Historic church in Florida, United States

- U.S. National Register of Historic Places
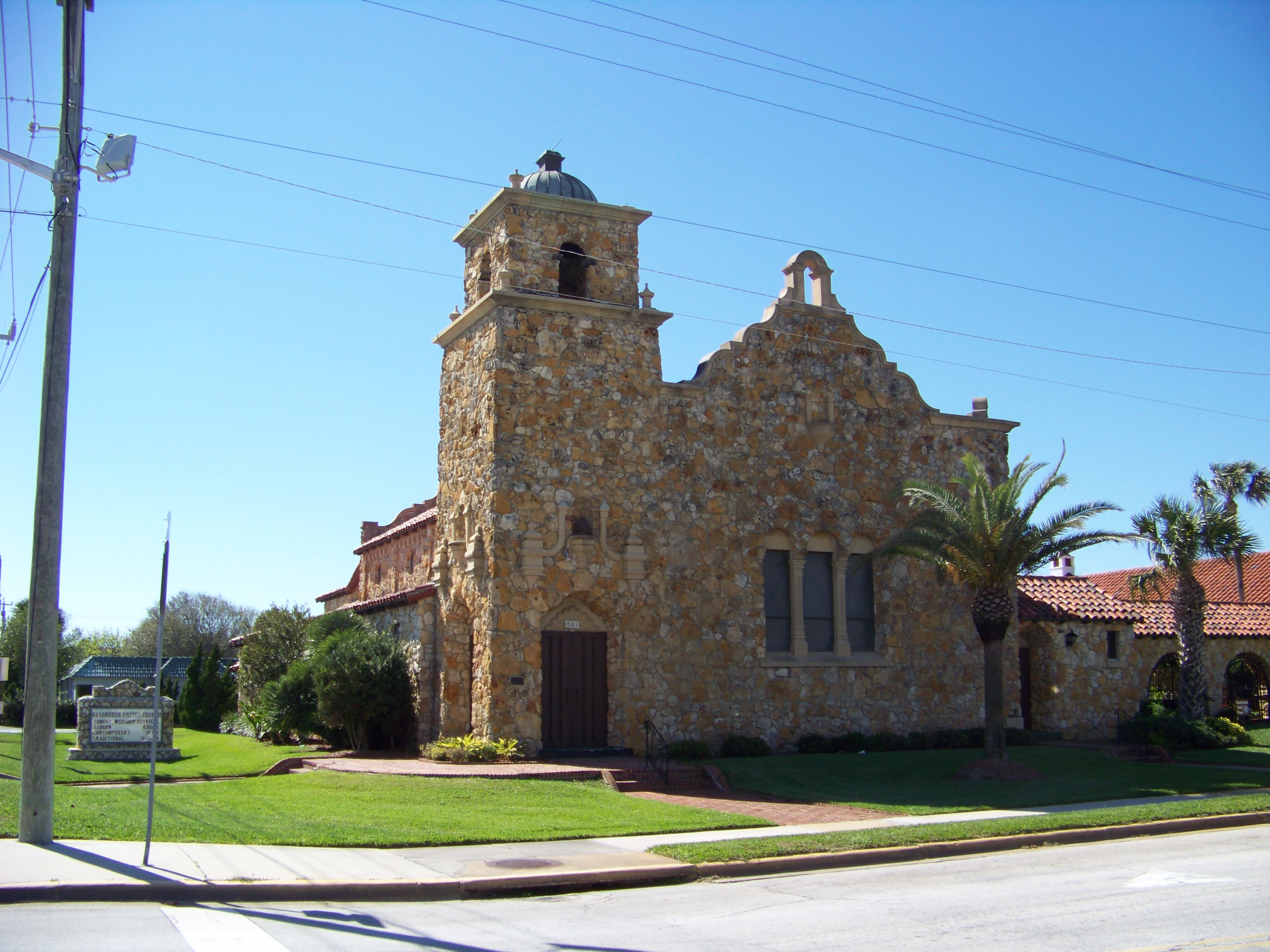

- Location within Volusia County
- Location: 501 N. Wild Olive Ave., Daytona Beach, Florida
- Coordinates: 29°13′59″N 81°0′52″W
- Area: less than one acre
- Built: 1929
- Architect: Harry Griffin
- Architectural style: Mission/Spanish Revival
- NRHP reference No.: 95001139

The Tourist Church, also known as the Seabreeze United Church of Christ and the First Congregational Church, is an historic church located at 501 North Wild Olive Avenue in Daytona Beach, Florida, United States. Built in 1929, it was designed by architect Harry Griffin in the Mission Revival Style of architecture.

Today it is an active United Church of Christ congregation. The church is currently looking for a new pastor.

On October 6, 1995, it was added to the National Register of Historic Places.

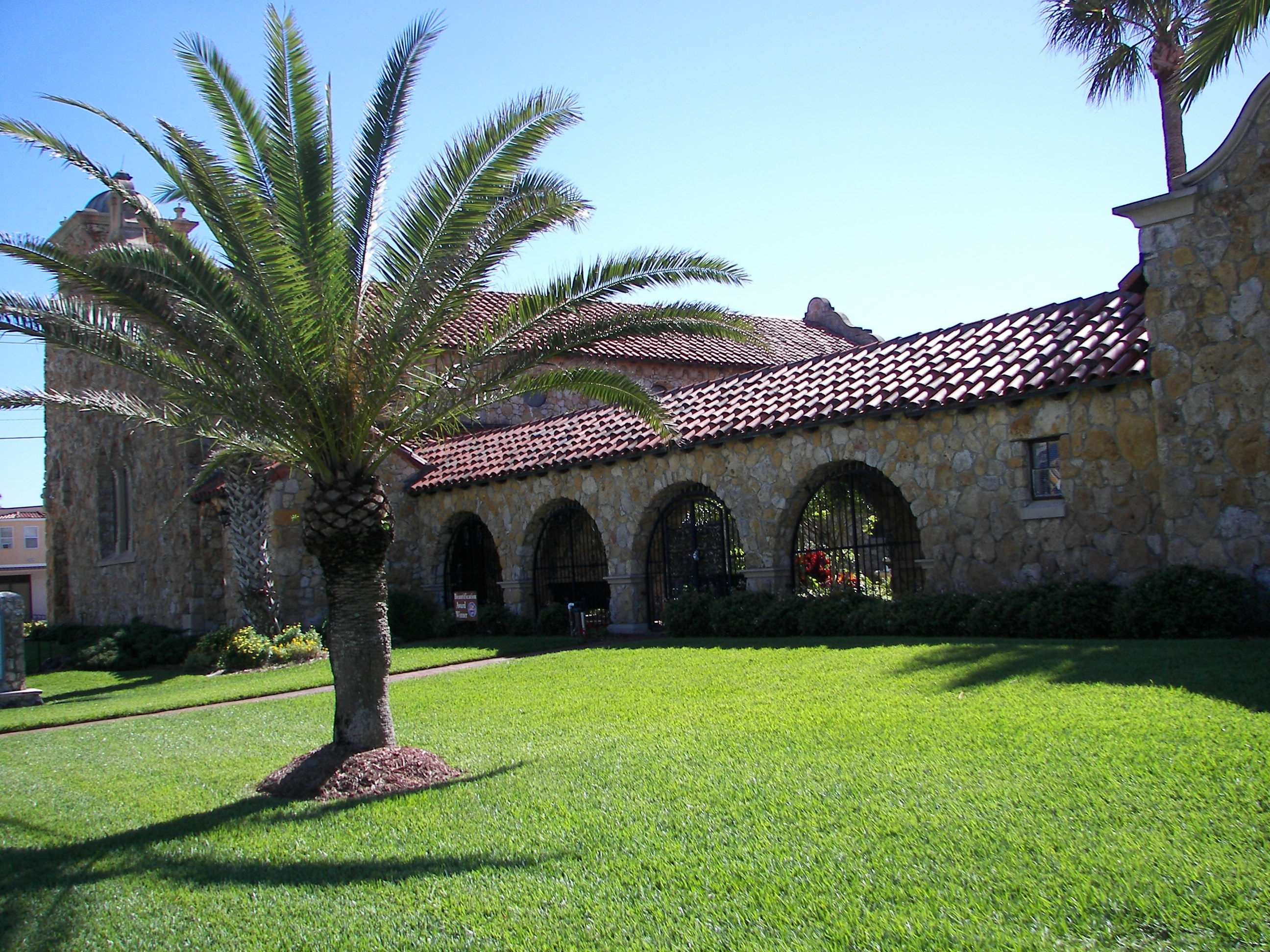
