= New Smyrna Beach Historic District =

Historic district in Florida, United States

- U.S. National Register of Historic Places
- U.S. Historic district
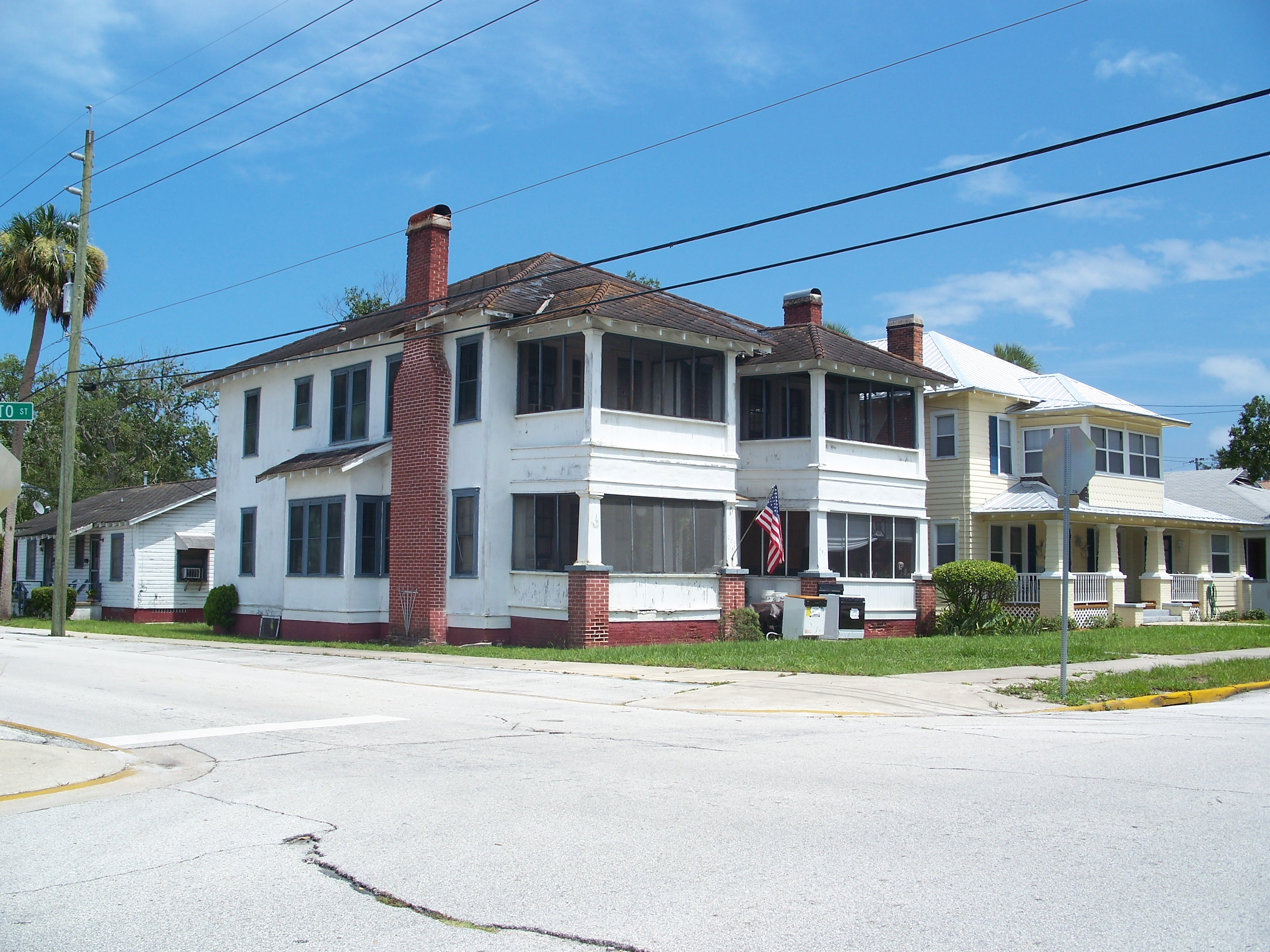
- Houses in the district

- Location within Volusia County
- Location: New Smyrna Beach, Florida
- Coordinates: 29°1′30″N 80°55′27″W
- Area: 1,000 acres (4.0 km^{2})
- NRHP reference No.: 90000714
- Added to NRHP: April 26, 1990

The New Smyrna Beach Historic District is a U.S. historic district (designated as such on April 26, 1990) located in New Smyrna Beach, Florida. The district is bounded by Riverside Drive, U.S. 1, Ronnoc Lane, and Smith Street. It contains 312 historic buildings.
