= Strawn Historic Agricultural District =

Historic district in Florida, United States

- Formerly listed on the U.S. National Register of Historic Places
- U.S. Historic district
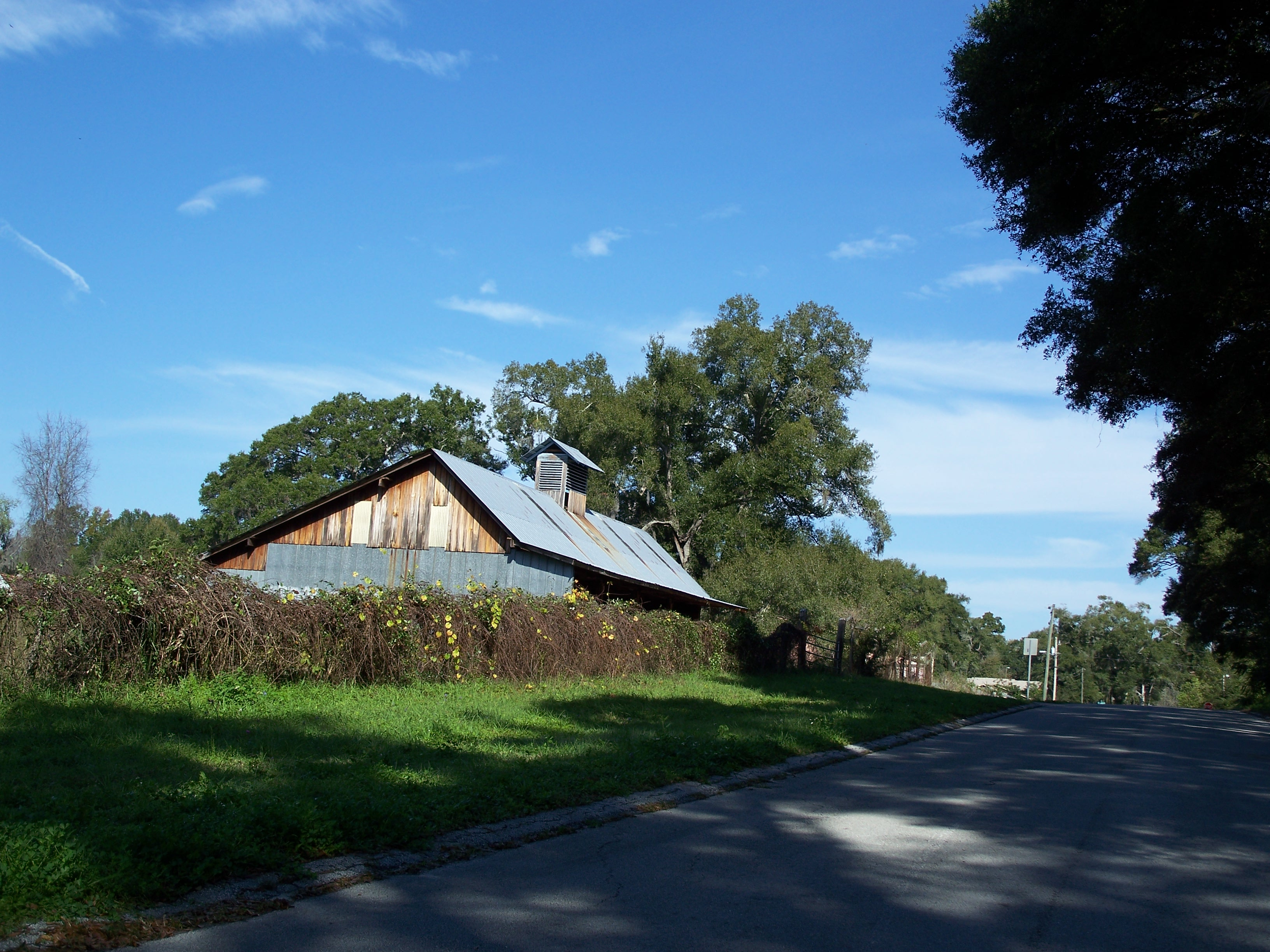
- Building in the District

- Location within Volusia County
- Location: DeLeon Springs, Florida, USA
- Coordinates: 29°6′56″N 81°20′56″W
- Area: 20 acres (0.081 km^{2})
- MPS: Citrus Industry Resources of Theodore Strawn, Inc., MPS
- NRHP reference No.: 93000929

Significant dates
- Added to NRHP: September 13, 1993
- Removed from NRHP: April 8, 2026

The Strawn Historic Agricultural District was a U.S. historic district (designated as such on September 13, 1993) located in DeLeon Springs, Florida. The district is bounded by Broderick and Retta Streets and by Central and Dundee Avenues. When listed on the National Register of Historic Places in 1993, it contained 17 historic buildings. It was delisted in 2026.
