= Turnbull Colonists' House Archeological Site =

Historic place in Florida, United States

- U.S. National Register of Historic Places
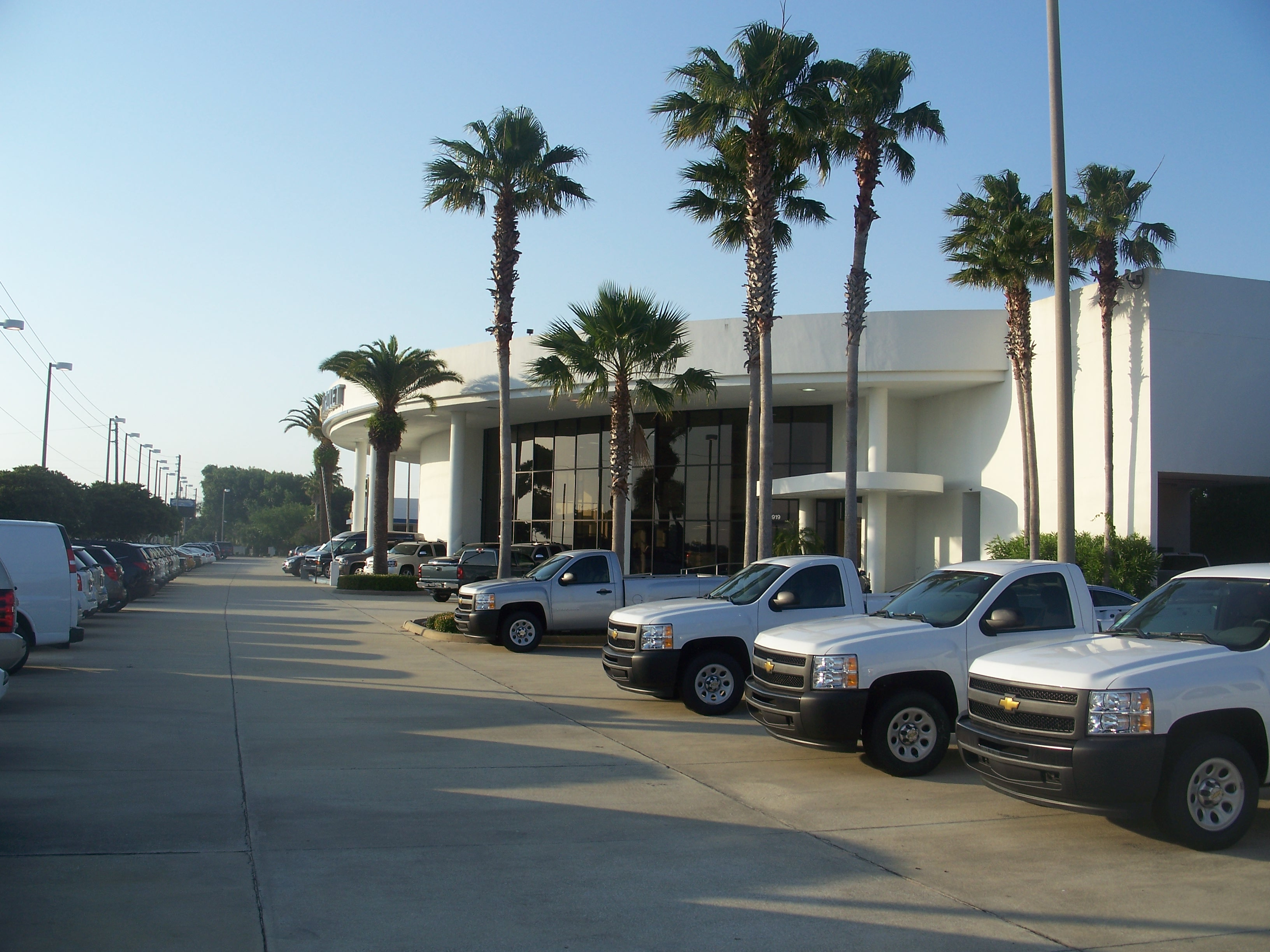
- The site was discovered in the process of this Chevrolet dealership being built

- Location within Florida Location within the United States
- Location: New Smyrna Beach, Florida
- Coordinates: 29.02°N 80.92°W
- MPS: Archeological Resources of the 18th-Century Smyrnea Settlement of Dr. Andrew Turnbull MPS
- NRHP reference No.: 08000632
- Added to NRHP: July 10, 2008

The Turnbull Colonists' House Archeological Site is a historic site in New Smyrna Beach, Florida, United States. It is located at 1919 North Dixie Freeway. On July 10, 2008, it was added to the U.S. National Register of Historic Places.

This property is part of the Archeological Resources of the 18th-Century Smyrnea Settlement of Dr. Andrew Turnbull Multiple Property Submission, a Multiple Property Submission to the National Register.
