= Turnbull Canal System =

- U.S. National Register of Historic Places
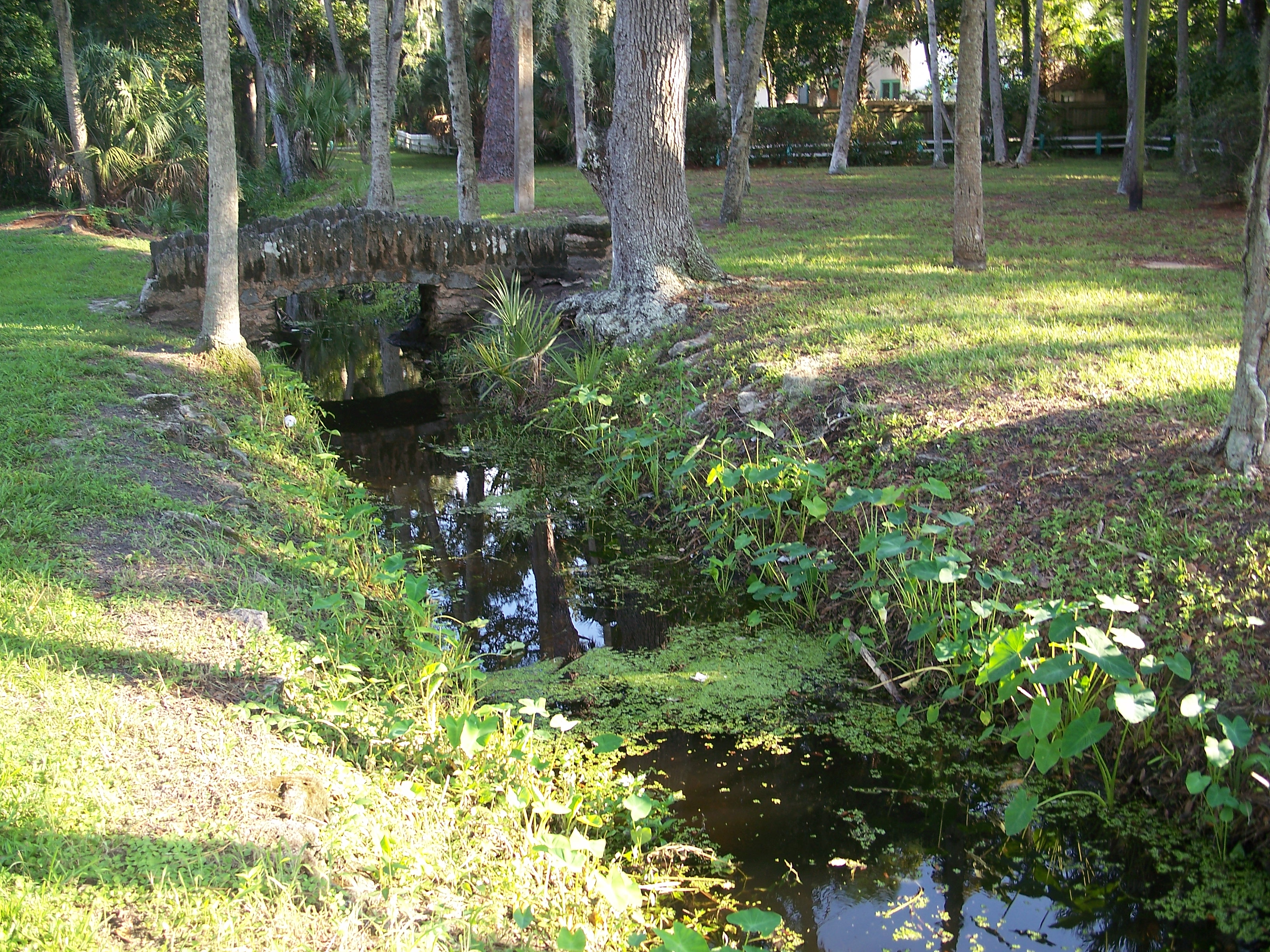
- Part of the old canal system, running through Myrtle Avenue Park
- Location: Address Restricted; New Smyrna Beach, Florida
- MPS: Archeological Resources of the 18th-Century Smyrnea Settlement of Dr. Andrew Turnbull MPS
- NRHP reference No.: 07000840
- Added to NRHP: August 24, 2007

The Turnbull Canal System is a historic area in New Smyrna Beach, Florida, United States. On August 24, 2007, it was added to the U.S. National Register of Historic Places.

This property is part of the Archeological Resources of the 18th-Century Smyrnea Settlement of Dr. Andrew Turnbull Multiple Property Submission, a Multiple Property Submission to the National Register.
