= Old Fort Park Archeological Site =

- U.S. National Register of Historic Places
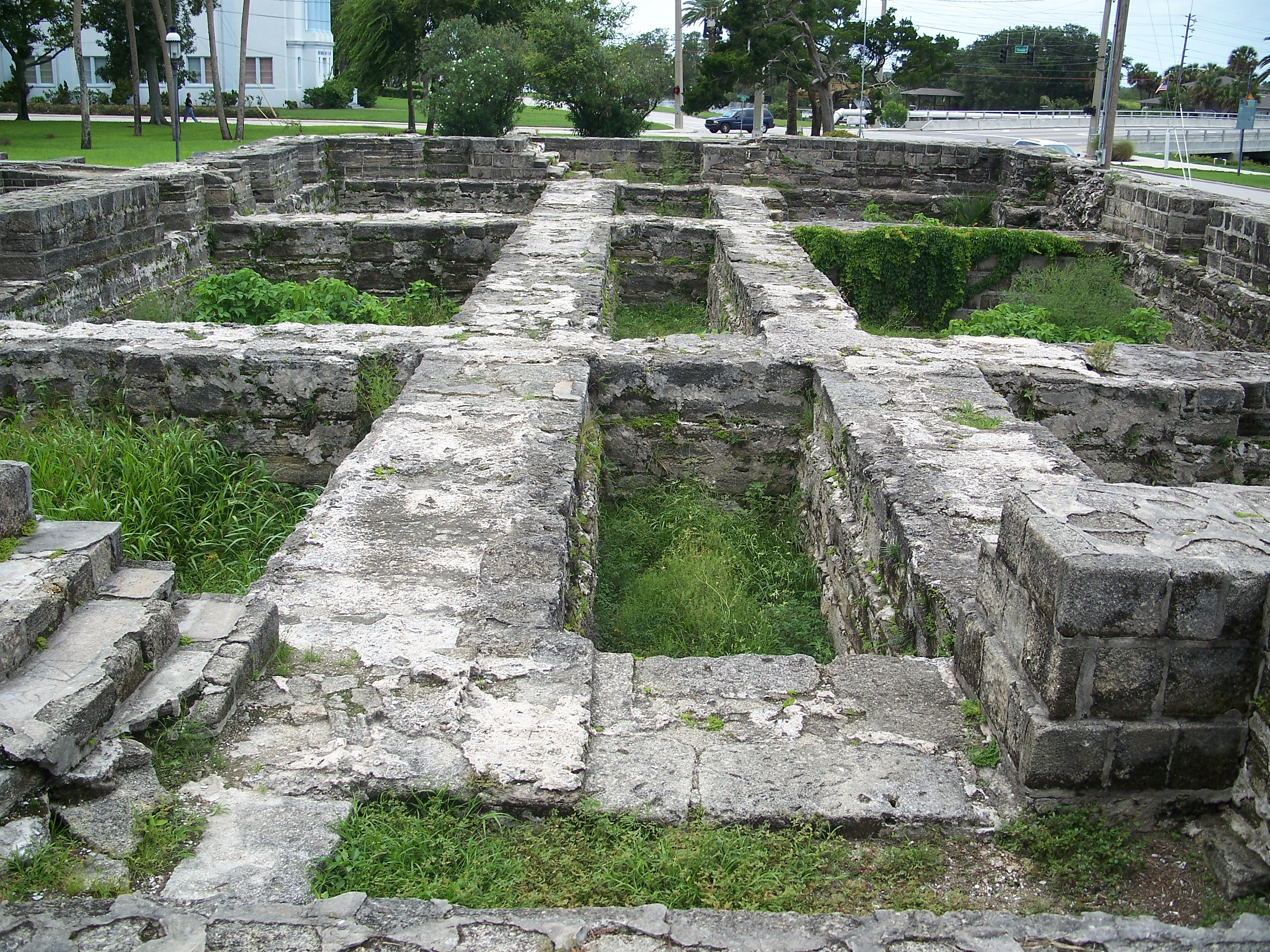
- Foundation of Turnbull Palace in Fort Park

- Location within Volusia County
- Location: New Smyrna Beach, Florida
- Coordinates: 29°1′37.83″N 80°55′20.37″W
- MPS: Archeological Resources of the 18th-Century Smyrna Settlement of Dr. Andrew Turnbull MPS
- NRHP reference No.: 08000629
- Added to NRHP: July 10, 2008

The Old Fort Park Archeological Site is a historic site in New Smyrna Beach, Florida, United States. On July 10, 2008, it was added to the U.S. National Register of Historic Places.

This property is part of the Archeological Resources of the 18th-Century Smyrna Settlement of Dr. Andrew Turnbull Multiple Property Submission, a Multiple Property Submission to the National Register.
