= National Register of Historic Places Multiple Property Submissions in Florida =

This is a list of the 58 Multiple Property Submissions on the National Register of Historic Places in Florida. They contain approximately 400 individual listings of the more than 1,500 on the National Register for the state.

MPS name	# of listings	Listings (if less than 5)	City	County	Reference Number / Summary
1733 Spanish Plate Fleet Shipwrecks MPS	13		various	Miami-Dade and Monroe counties	64500947
Archeological Properties of the Naval Live Oaks Reservation MPS	6		Gulf Breeze	Santa Rosa	64500092
Archeological Resources in the Upper St. Johns River Valley MPS	2	Indian Fields - Persimmon Mound	Titusville - Rockledge	Brevard	64500093
Archeological Resources of Everglades National Park MPS	7		various	Miami-Dade and Monroe counties	64500094
Archeological Resources of the 18th-Century Smyrnea Settlement of Dr. Andrew Turnbull MPS	13		Edgewater and New Smyrna Beach	Volusia	64500988
Archeological Resources of the Caloosahatchee Region MPS	6		various	Lee	64500095
Bartow MPS	6		Bartow	Polk	64500096
Citrus Industry Resources of Theodore Strawn, Inc., MPS	3	Strawn Historic Agricultural District - Strawn Historic Citrus Packing House District - Strawn Historic Sawmill District	DeLeon Springs	Volusia	64500097
Civil War Era National Cemeteries MPS	1	Barrancas National Cemetery	Pensacola	Escambia	64500098 / The Barrancas National Cemetery is the only Florida listing on this MPS
Clubhouses of Florida's Woman's Clubs MPS	7		various	various	64500099
Country Club Estates TR	8		Miami Springs	Miami-Dade	64000114
Daytona Beach	9		Daytona Beach	Volusia	64500100
DeFuniak Springs MPS	2	Perry L. Biddle House - DeFuniak Springs Historic District	DeFuniak Springs	Walton	64500101
Downtown Jacksonville	11		Jacksonville	Duval	64500102
Downtown Miami MRA	29		Downtown Miami	Miami-Dade	64000115
Early Residences of Rural Marion County MPS	6		various	Marion	64500103
Fellsmere MPS	3	Marian Fell Library - Fellsmere Public School - First Methodist Episcopal Church	Fellsmere	Indian River	64500104
Fish Cabins of Charlotte Harbor	12			Charlotte and Lee counties	64500105
Florida's Carpenter Gothic Churches MPS	2	St. George Episcopal Church – St. Mary's Episcopal Church	Jacksonville - Madison	Duval - Madison	64500106
Florida's Historic Black Public Schools	5		various	various	64500852
Florida's Historic Lighthouses MPS	1	Amelia Island Lighthouse	Fernandina Beach	Nassau	64500824
Florida's Historic Railroad Resources MPS	3	Seaboard Air Line Dining Car-6113 - Seaboard Air Line Lounge Car-6603 - Old Dundee ACL Railroad Depot	Boca Raton - Dundee	Palm Beach - Polk	64500107
Florida's Historic World War II Military Resources MPS	1	Chief Master at Arms House	DeLand	Volusia	64500773
Florida's New Deal Resources MPS	4	Vocational Agriculture Building - St. Augustine Civic Center - Fort Matanzas National Monument Headquarters and Visitor Center - Spring Lake Community Center	Bunnell - St. Augustine - Spring Lake	Flagler - St. Johns - Hernando	64500918
Haines City MPS	5		Haines City	Polk	64500108
Historic Winter Residences of Ormond Beach, 1878–1925 MPS	7		Ormond Beach	Volusia	64500109
Homestead MPS	6		Homestead	Miami-Dade	64500110
John F. Kennedy Space Center MPS	11		Titusville	Brevard	64500111
Kissimmee MPS	4	Colonial Estate - First United Methodist Church – Kissimmee Historic District - Old Holy Redeemer Catholic Church	Kissimmee	Osceola	64500112
LaBelle, FL MPS	1	Caldwell Home Place	LaBelle	Hendry	64500828
Lake City MPS	4	Columbia County High School - Horace Duncan House - Lake City Historic Commercial District - Lake Isabella Historic Residential District	Lake City	Columbia	64500113
Lake Helen MPS	2	Lake Helen Historic District - Ann Stevens House	Lake Helen	Volusia	64500114
Lake Wales MPS	8		Lake Wales	Polk	64500115
Lee County MPS	14		various	Lee	64500116
Marianna MPS	1	Marianna Historic District	Marianna	Jackson	64500117
Mediterranean Revival Style Buildings of Davis Islands	23		Tampa	Hillsborough	64500118
Miami Shores Thematic Resource	24		Miami Shores	Miami-Dade	64000116
Middleburg MPS	6		Middleburg	Clay	64500119
Mount Dora			Mount Dora	Lake	64501043
North Beach Community (1919-1963), MPS					64501022
Opa-locka Thematic Resource	20		Opa-locka	Miami-Dade	64000117, 64000118
Orange City, Florida MPS	1	Orange City Historic District	Orange City	Volusia	64500881
Orange Park, Florida MPS	7		Orange Park	Clay	64500120
Port Orange MPS	4	Dunlawton Avenue Historic District - Grace Episcopal Church and Guild Hall - Halifax Drive Historic District (delisted) - Port Orange Florida East Coast Railway Freight Depot	Port Orange	Volusia	64500121
Punta Gorda MPS	7		Punta Gorda	Charlotte	64500122
Rockledge MPS	2	Rockledge Drive Residential District - Valencia Subdivision Residential District	Rockledge	Brevard	64500123
Rural Resources of Leon County MPS	2	Bannerman Plantation - Roberts Farm Historic and Archeological District	Tallahassee	Leon	64500124
San Jose Estates Thematic Resource Area	25		Jacksonville	Duval	64000119
Sarasota MRA	26		Sarasota	Sarasota	64000120
Sarasota School of Architecture MPS	2	Lucienne Nielsen House - Revere Quality Institute House	Nokomis - Sarasota	Sarasota	64500972
Sebring MPS	9		Sebring	Highlands	64500125
Tarpon Springs Sponge Boats MPS	5		Tarpon Springs	Pinellas	64500126
Titusville MPS	5		Titusville	Brevard	64500127
University of Florida Campus MPS					64501011
Venice MPS	10		Venice	Sarasota	64500128
Whitfield Estates Subdivision	7		Sarasota	Manatee	64500129
Winter Haven, Florida MPS	4	Downtown Winter Haven Historic District - Interlaken Historic Residential District - Pope Avenue Historic District – Winter Haven Heights Historic Residential District	Winter Haven	Polk	64500130
