= National Register of Historic Places listings in Hendry County, Florida =

Location of Hendry County in Florida

This is a list of the National Register of Historic Places listings in Hendry County, Florida.

This is intended to be a complete list of the properties and districts on the National Register of Historic Places in Hendry County, Florida, United States. The locations of National Register properties and districts for which the latitude and longitude coordinates are included below, may be seen in a map.

There are 12 properties and districts listed on the National Register in the county.

This National Park Service list is complete through NPS recent listings posted March 21, 2025.

Contents: Counties in Florida (non-linked contain no National Register listings)
Alachua - Baker - Bay - Bradford - Brevard - Broward - Calhoun - Charlotte - Citrus - Clay - Collier - Columbia - DeSoto - Dixie - Duval - Escambia - Flagler - Franklin - Gadsden - Gilchrist - Glades - Gulf - Hamilton - Hardee - Hendry - Hernando - Highlands - Hillsborough (Tampa) - Holmes - Indian River - Jackson - Jefferson - Lafayette - Lake - Lee - Leon - Levy - Liberty - Madison - Manatee - Marion - Martin - Miami-Dade (Miami) - Monroe - Nassau - Okaloosa - Okeechobee - Orange - Osceola - Palm Beach - Pasco - Pinellas - Polk - Putnam - St. Johns - St. Lucie - Santa Rosa - Sarasota - Seminole - Sumter - Suwannee - Taylor - Union - Volusia - Wakulla - Walton - Washington

== Current listings ==
	Name on the Register	Image	Date listed	Location	City or town	Description
1	Caldwell Home Place	Caldwell Home Place	February 13, 2003 (#03000009)	160 Curry Street; 26°46′01″N 81°26′29″W	LaBelle	Part of the LaBelle, FL MPS
2	Clewiston Historic Schools	Clewiston Historic Schools	September 26, 1997 (#97001172)	325 East Circle Drive and 475 East Osceola Avenue; 26°45′21″N 80°55′42″W	Clewiston	
3	Clewiston Inn	Clewiston Inn	February 21, 1991 (#91000106)	U.S. Route 27 west of its junction with State Road 832; 26°45′35″N 80°56′20″W	Clewiston	
4	Dixie Crystal Theatre	Dixie Crystal Theatre	September 25, 1998 (#98001202)	100 East Sugarland Highway; 26°45′14″N 80°56′04″W	Clewiston	
5	Downtown LaBelle Historic District	Downtown LaBelle Historic District	March 25, 1999 (#99000371)	300 block of North Bridge Street; 26°45′59″N 81°26′15″W	LaBelle	
6	Capt. F. Deane Duff House	Capt. F. Deane Duff House	January 30, 1998 (#98000025)	151 West Del Monte Avenue; 26°45′41″N 80°56′02″W	Clewiston	
7	Executive House	Executive House	February 5, 1998 (#98000059)	125 West Del Monte Avenue; 26°45′44″N 80°55′58″W	Clewiston	
8	First Clewiston Post Office	First Clewiston Post Office	March 7, 2017 (#100000710)	111–113 Bond St. 26°45′13″N 80°56′00″W	Clewiston	
9	Forrey Building and Annex	Forrey Building and Annex	July 28, 1995 (#95000914)	264-282 Bridge Street; 26°45′56″N 81°26′16″W	LaBelle	
10	Capt. Francis A. Hendry House	Capt. Francis A. Hendry House	February 5, 1998 (#98000061)	512 Fraser Street; 26°45′55″N 81°26′46″W	LaBelle	
11	Old Hendry County Courthouse	Old Hendry County Courthouse	November 8, 1990 (#90001744)	Junction of Bridge Street and Hickpochee Avenue; 26°45′40″N 81°26′17″W	LaBelle	
12	Scharnberg House	Scharnberg House	April 26, 1999 (#99000472)	325 East Del Monte Avenue; 26°45′37″N 80°55′49″W	Clewiston	

== See also ==
- List of National Historic Landmarks in Florida
- National Register of Historic Places listings in Florida
