= National Register of Historic Places listings in Hernando County, Florida =

Location of Hernando County in Florida

Hernando County, Florida, United States, has nine properties and districts located on the National Register of Historic Places.

The locations of National Register properties and districts for which the latitude and longitude coordinates are included below may be seen in a map.

This National Park Service list is complete through NPS recent listings posted September 4, 2026.

Contents: Counties in Florida (non-linked contain no National Register listings)
Alachua - Baker - Bay - Bradford - Brevard - Broward - Calhoun - Charlotte - Citrus - Clay - Collier - Columbia - DeSoto - Dixie - Duval - Escambia - Flagler - Franklin - Gadsden - Gilchrist - Glades - Gulf - Hamilton - Hardee - Hendry - Hernando - Highlands - Hillsborough (Tampa) - Holmes - Indian River - Jackson - Jefferson - Lafayette - Lake - Lee - Leon - Levy - Liberty - Madison - Manatee - Marion - Martin - Miami-Dade (Miami) - Monroe - Nassau - Okaloosa - Okeechobee - Orange - Osceola - Palm Beach - Pasco - Pinellas - Polk - Putnam - St. Johns - St. Lucie - Santa Rosa - Sarasota - Seminole - Sumter - Suwannee - Taylor - Union - Volusia - Wakulla - Walton - Washington

== Current listings ==
| | Name on the Register | Image | Date listed | Location | City or town | Description |
|---|---|---|---|---|---|---|
| 1 | Chinsegut Hill Manor House | Chinsegut Hill Manor House | November 21, 2003 (#03001171) | 22495 Chinsegut Hill Road; 28°37′03″N 82°22′06″W | Brooksville | |
| 2 | William Sherman Jennings House | William Sherman Jennings House | October 22, 1998 (#98001252) | 48 Olive Street; 28°32′55″N 82°23′06″W | Brooksville | |
| 3 | May-Stringer House | May-Stringer House | March 8, 1997 (#97000210) | 601 Museum Court; 28°33′20″N 82°22′53″W | Brooksville | |
| 4 | Richloam General Store and Post Office | Richloam General Store and Post Office | October 12, 2017 (#100001734) | 38219 Richloam Clay Sink Rd. 28°30′05″N 82°06′48″W | Webster vicinity | Former general store, post office and Atlantic Coast Line Railroad station in a defunct community within the Withlacoochee State Forest. |
| 5 | Judge Willis Russell House | Judge Willis Russell House | January 27, 1999 (#99000046) | 201 South Main Street; 28°33′07″N 82°23′15″W | Brooksville | |
| 6 | Frank Saxon House | Frank Saxon House | November 5, 1998 (#98001321) | 200 Saxon Avenue; 28°33′11″N 82°22′51″W | Brooksville | |
| 7 | Sinclair Service Station | Sinclair Service Station | July 27, 2020 (#100005385) | 5299 Commercial Way; 28°30′19″N 82°35′13″W | Spring Hill | Dinosaur-shaped former gas station, now known as Harold's Garage |
| 8 | South Brooksville Avenue Historic District | South Brooksville Avenue Historic District | September 25, 1998 (#98001203) | Roughly along South Brooksville Avenue, from Liberty Street to Early Avenue; 28°33′06″N 82°23′11″W | Brooksville | |
| 9 | Spring Lake Community Center | Spring Lake Community Center | October 20, 2009 (#09000843) | 4184 Spring Lake Highway; 28°29′33″N 82°18′10″W | Spring Lake | Part of the Florida's New Deal Resources MPS |
| 10 | Weeki Wachee Springs | Weeki Wachee Springs | January 22, 2020 (#100004890) | 6131 Commercial Way; 28°31′03″N 82°34′21″W | Spring Hill | |

== See also ==
- List of National Historic Landmarks in Florida
- National Register of Historic Places listings in Florida
