= Barnett Lake (Florida) =

Coordinates: 28.32374°N 80.77432°W

- Location within Florida Location within the United States
- Location: Brevard County, Florida
- Type: Natural freshwater lake
- Primary inflows: Faulk Canal
- Primary outflows: Faulk Canal
- Basin countries: United States
- Max. length: 1,000 ft (300 m)
- Max. width: 640 ft (200 m)
- Surface area: 6.59 acres (2.67 ha)
- Surface elevation: 10 ft (3.0 m)

Barnett Lake is a small lake 500 ft (150 m) southwest of I-95 in Brevard County, Florida. This lake, in the River Lakes Conservation Area, has no park areas or public swimming beaches. It has no road access.
