= Coogler =

Coogler is a surname of German origin, and an Americanized version of Kugler. Notable people with the surname include:

- J. Gordon Coogler (1865–1901), American poet
- L. Scott Coogler (born 1959), American judge
- Ryan Coogler (born 1986), American film director, producer and screenwriter

== See also ==
- T.S. Coogler House
