= May-Stringer House =

Historic house in Florida, United States

- U.S. National Register of Historic Places
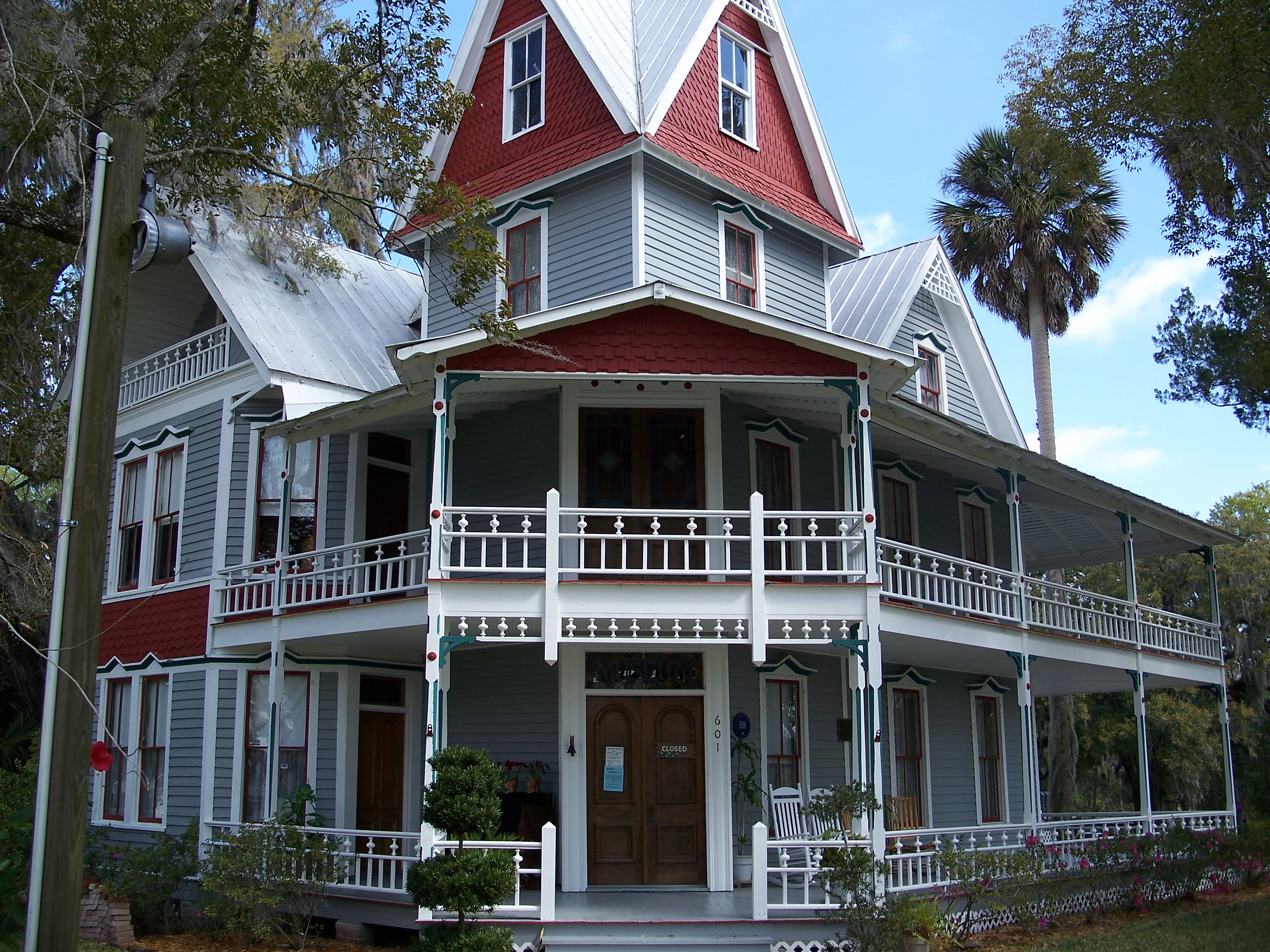

- Location within Florida Location within the United States
- Location: Brooksville, Florida
- Coordinates: 28°33′20″N 82°22′53″W
- Built: 1855
- Architectural style: Queen Anne
- NRHP reference No.: 97000210
- Added to NRHP: March 8, 1997

The May-Stringer House, home of the Hernando Heritage Museum, is a historic residential building in Brooksville, Florida, United States. It is located at 601 Museum Court. On March 8, 1997, it was added to the National Register of Historic Places.

Overlooking the City of Brooksville, the house is a four-story, seven-gable, gingerbread-trim, fourteen-room painted-lady–style Victorian-era home. The Hernando Historical Museum Association has created exhibit rooms with a Victorian look, and there are rooms devoted to specific themes such as an elegant dining room, bedrooms, military room, an 1880s doctor's office, and a 1900s communication room. The museum contains over 10,000 artifacts that can be viewed.

== History ==
In 1842, The Armed Occupation Act ratified by the U.S. Congress, stated: “any settler who came to Florida, lived on the land for five years, cultivated five acres, and built a dwelling would be granted 160 acres”. Richard Wiggins homesteaded the land where the May Stringer house is located.

In 1855, John L. May purchased the property and built a four-room home for his family. John lived the house with his wife, Marina, and their daughters, Matilda and Annie. Unfortunately, John died of tuberculosis three years later.

Marina remained in the home throughout the Civil War and eventually married Confederate soldier Frank Saxon. She died giving birth to the couple's child, a girl named Jessie Mae, in 1869. Jessie survived her birth but died of unknown causes three years later. Marina and Jessie were buried on the property, as were John May and the infant son of Frank and Marena, a detail which fuels many rumors about the May-Stringer haunting. It is known as one of the most haunted houses in Florida.

Frank Saxon sold the home, and the property eventually made its way to Dr. Sheldon Stringer. The doctor added ten rooms to the house giving it the Victorian appearance it has today. The estate also served the doctor's medical practice for many years.

After the death of the Stringers, the house passed from one owner to another until Dr. Earl Hensley and his wife Helen sold it to The Hernando Historical Museum Association in 1980.

The May-Stringer House Museum is one of three museums operated by the Hernando Historical Museum Association. In addition to the May-Stringer House, the 1885 Brooksville Train Depot Museum and One Room Schoolhouse Museum are run by the Association.

== Haunting ==
The May-Stringer House is often described as one of the most haunted locations in Florida. Reports of paranormal activity include unexplained cold spots, moving shadows, orbs of light, and the sound of a crying child. The most well-known spirit said to reside in the home is that of Jessie Mae, the young daughter of Marina May and Frank Saxon, who died in the house at the age of three. Her former bedroom is a focal point for ghost tours and paranormal investigations, with visitors frequently reporting sensations of being touched or hearing whispers.

Additional stories of hauntings stem from the home’s long history, including its time as a medical practice under Dr. Sheldon Stringer. Some accounts describe spirits of former patients and family members lingering in the building. The attic is also associated with a particularly unsettling presence that has become part of the home’s folklore.

Today, the Hernando Historical Museum Association offers ghost tours and paranormal investigations at the May-Stringer House, making it a popular destination for those interested in both local history and supernatural lore.

== See also ==
- National Register of Historic Places listings in Hernando County, Florida
