= Indian Field =

Indian Field or Indian Fields may refer to:

- Indian Field, Connecticut, a census designated place
- Indian Field site, an archaeological site in Lee County, Florida
- Helm Field#Indian Field, a World War II auxiliary army airfield near Huron, California
- Indian Fields, several historic sites in Brevard County, Florida
- Indian Fields, Nova Scotia, an unincorporated community

== See also ==
- Indian Field Gun
- Indian old field
