= Pope Avenue Historic District =

Historic district in Florida, United States

- U.S. National Register of Historic Places
- U.S. Historic district
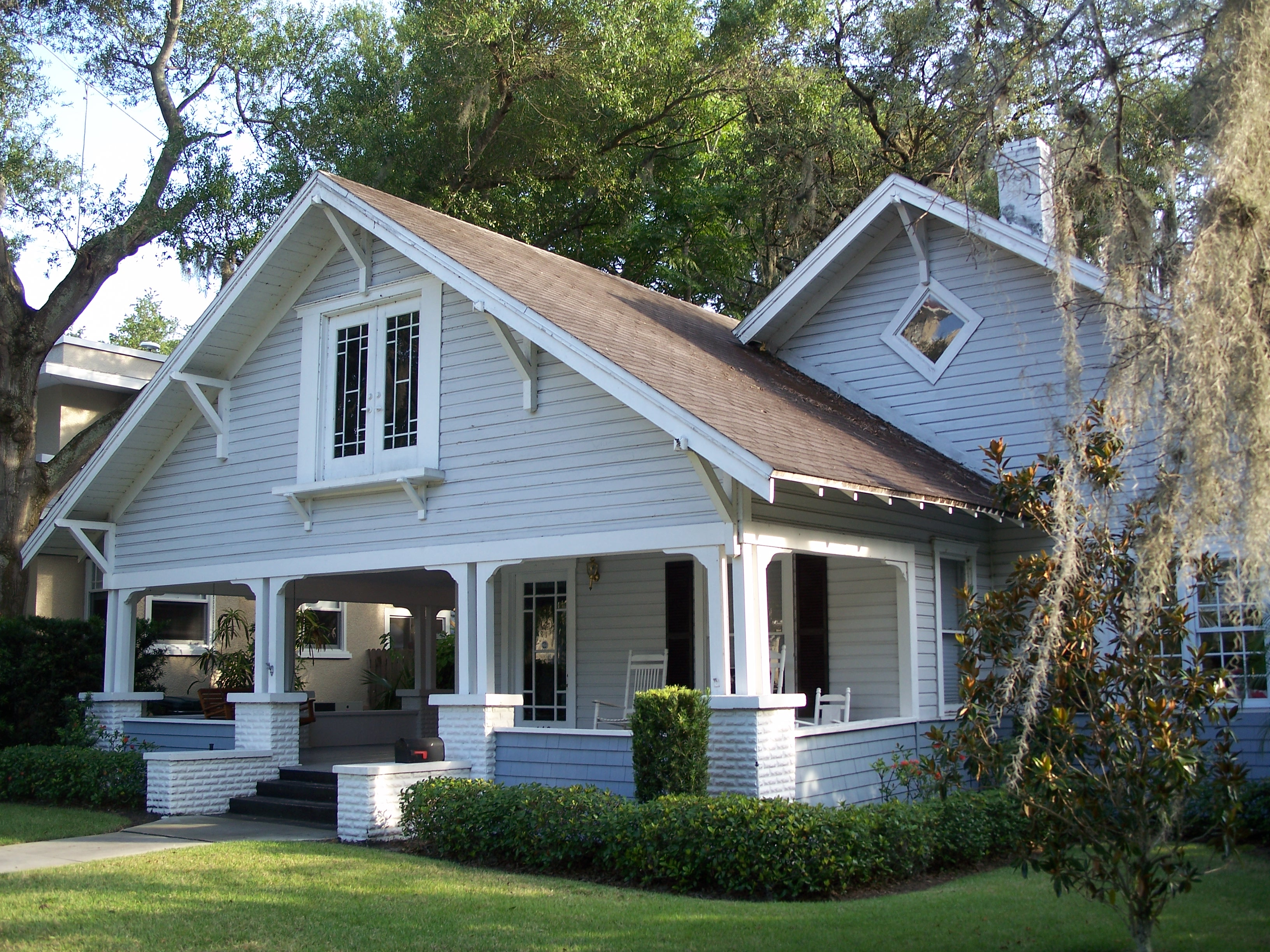
- House in the district

- Location within Florida Location within the United States
- Location: Winter Haven, Florida
- Coordinates: 28°1′29″N 81°44′3″W
- Area: 100 acres (0.40 km^{2})
- NRHP reference No.: 01001337
- Added to NRHP: December 7, 2001

The Pope Avenue Historic District is a U.S. historic district (designated as such on December 7, 2001) located in Winter Haven, Florida. The district is bounded roughly by Avenue A Northwest, Pope Avenue Northwest, 6th and 7th Streets Northwest. It contains 29 historic buildings.

== Gallery ==
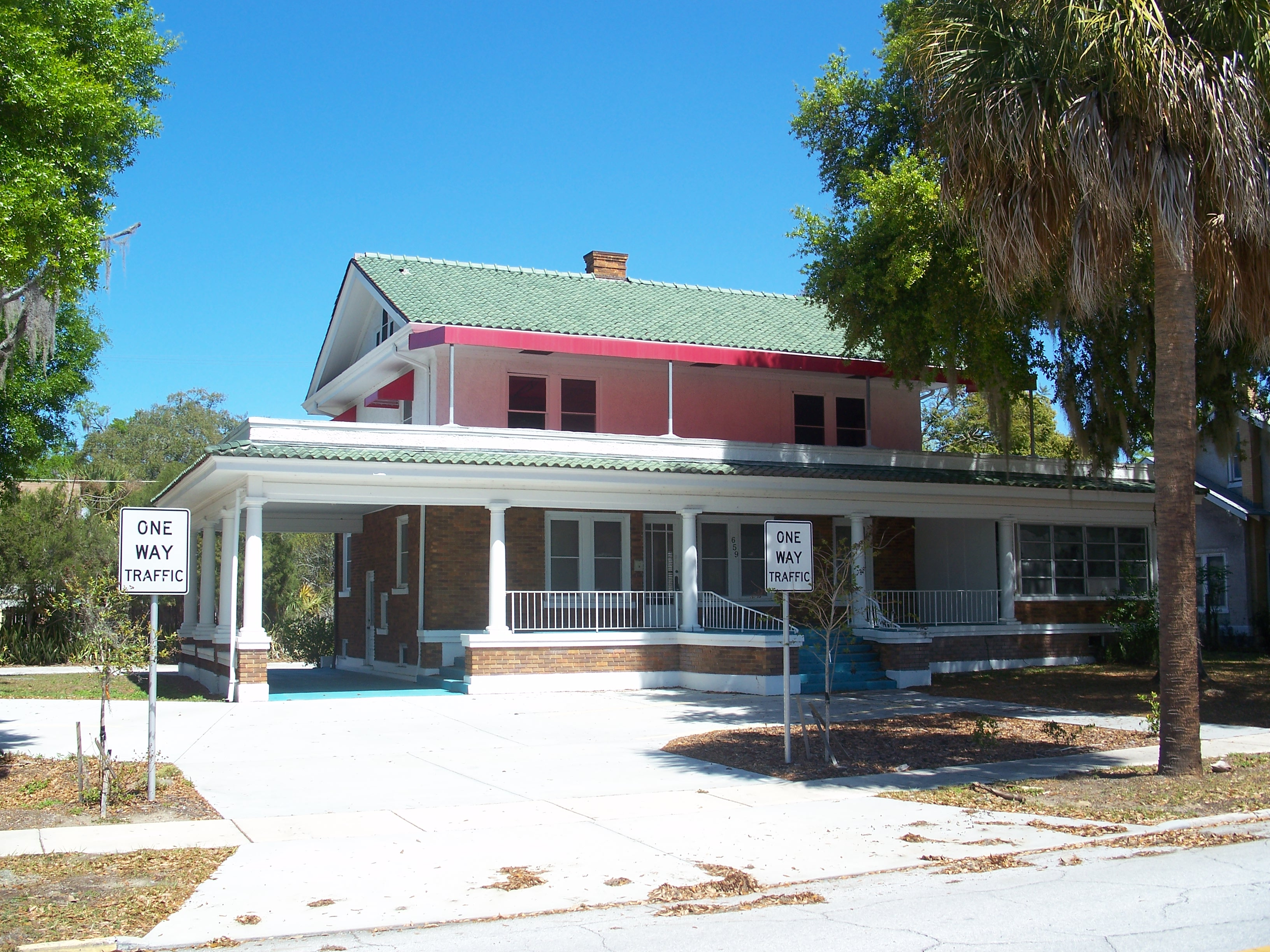

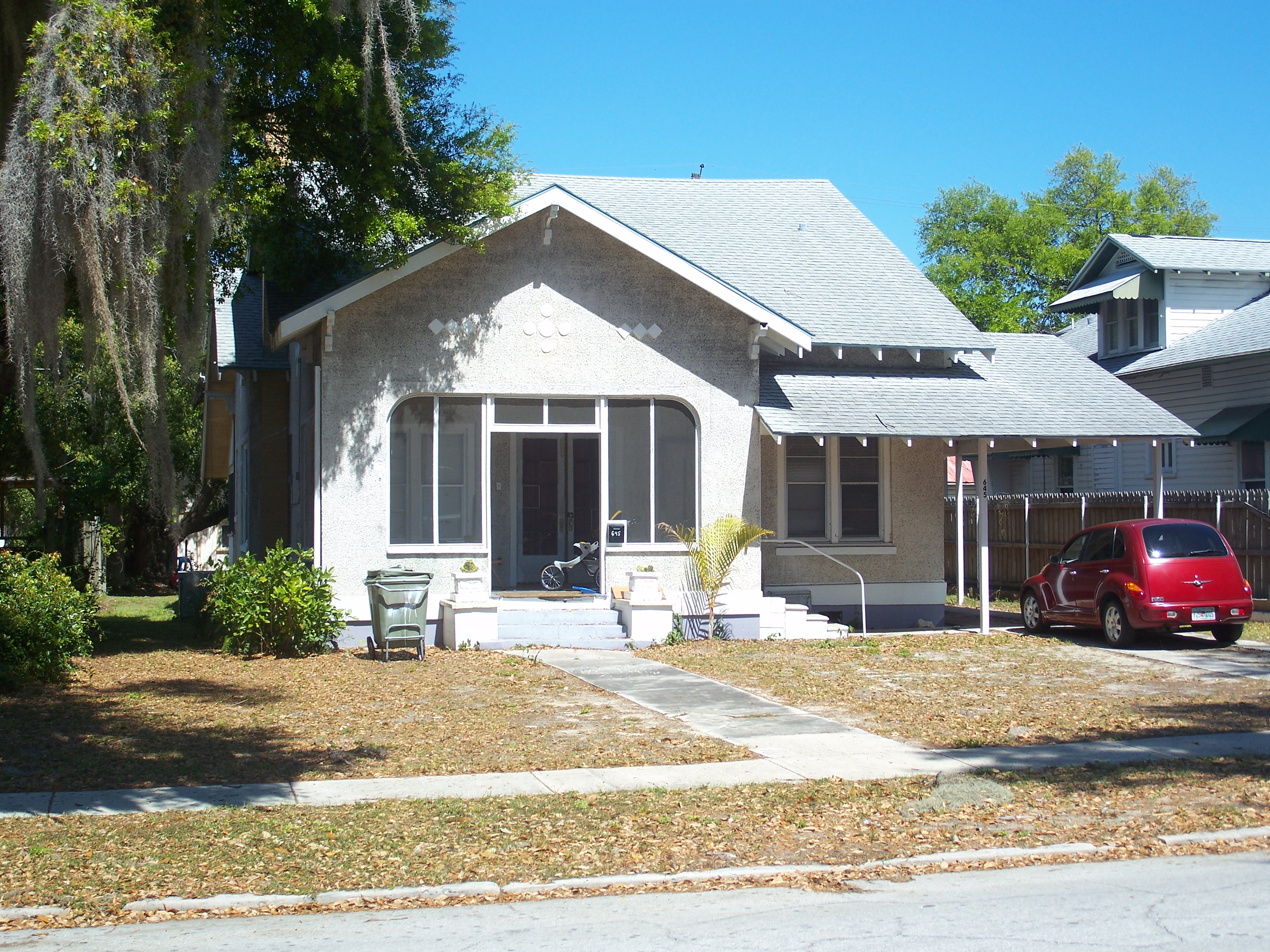

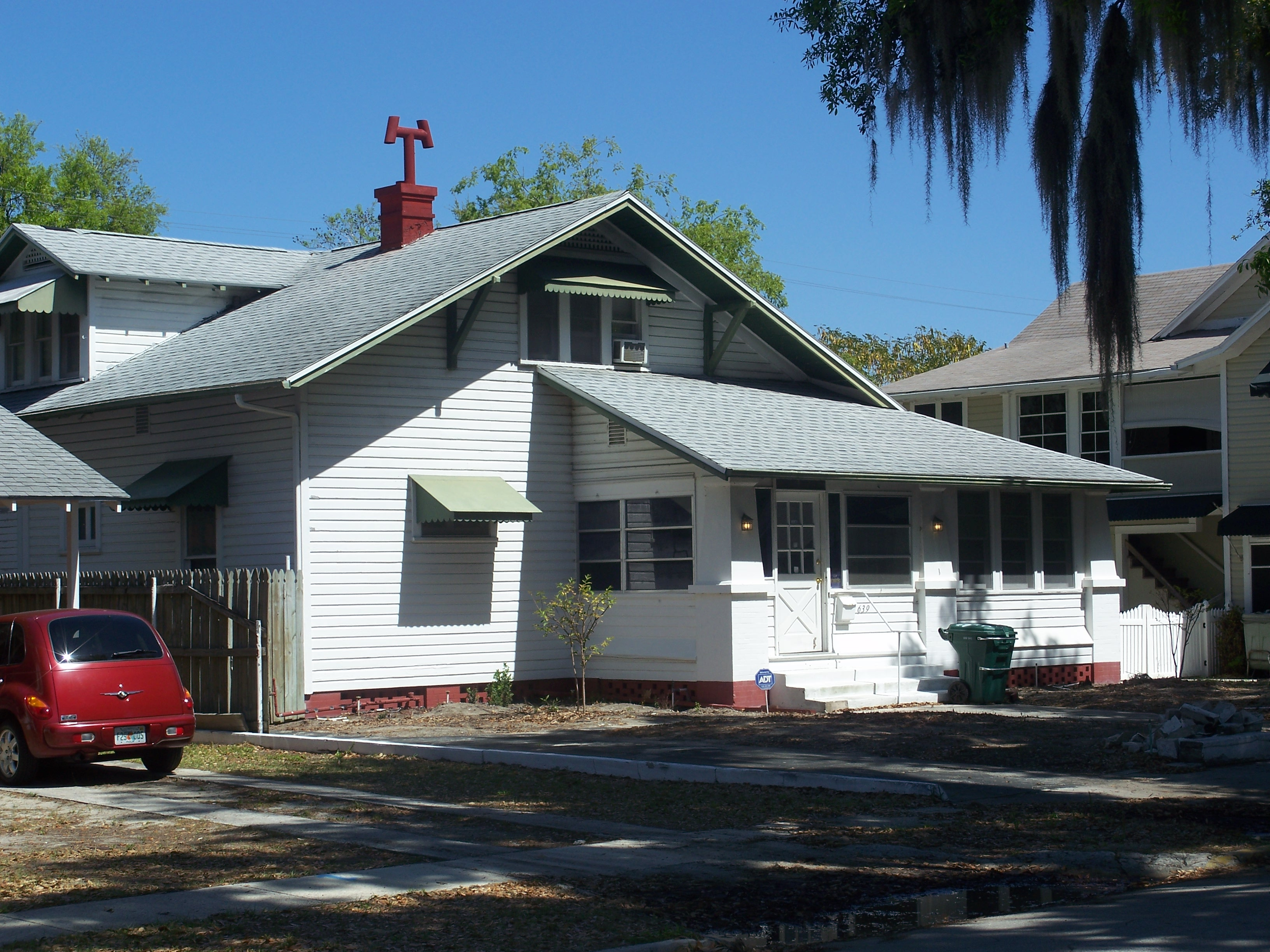

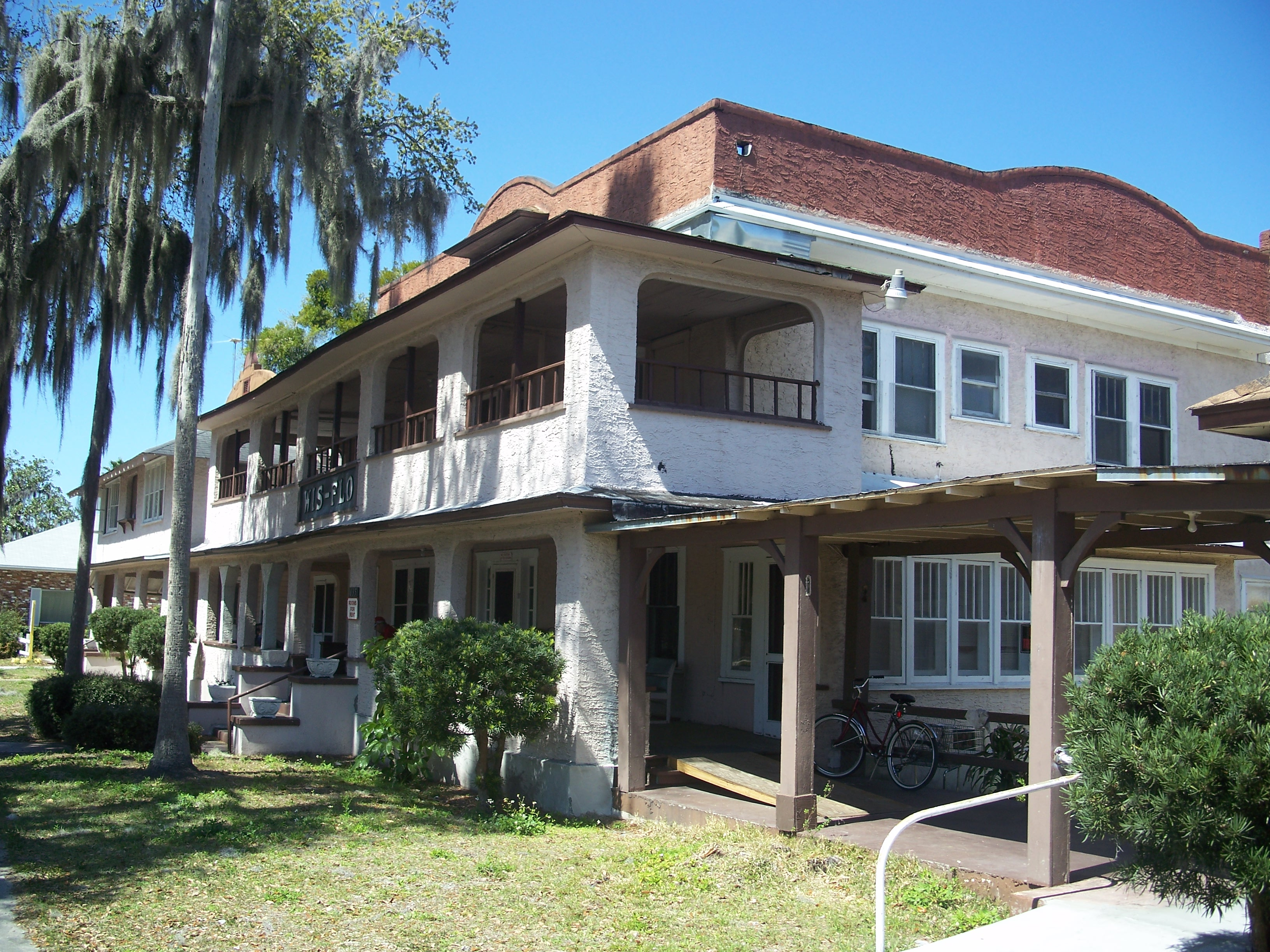
