= Capt. F. Deane Duff House =

Historic house in Florida, United States

- U.S. National Register of Historic Places
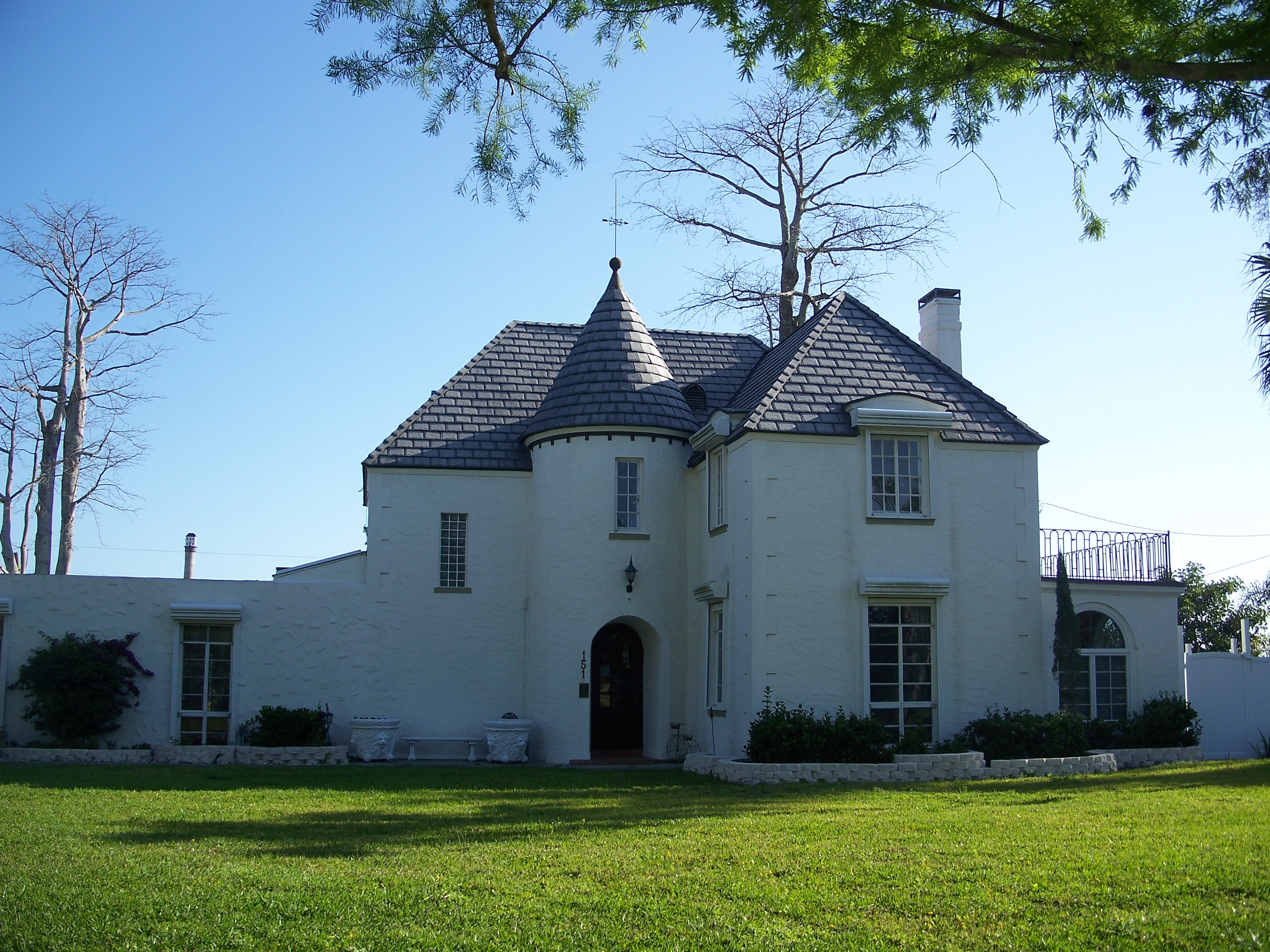

- Location within Florida Location within the United States
- Location: 151 W. Del Monte Ave., Clewiston, Florida
- Coordinates: 26°45′41″N 80°56′2″W
- Area: less than one acre
- Architect: Lawrence, Clark; Walker, G.E.
- Architectural style: Late 19th And 20th Century Revivals
- NRHP reference No.: 98000025
- Added to NRHP: 30 January 1998

The Capt. F. Deane Duff House is a historic site in Clewiston, Florida. It is located at 151 West Del Monte Avenue. On January 30, 1998, it was added to the U.S. National Register of Historic Places.
