= T.S. Coogler House =

Historic residence in Brooksville, Florida

Coordinates: 28.55315°N 82.38631°W

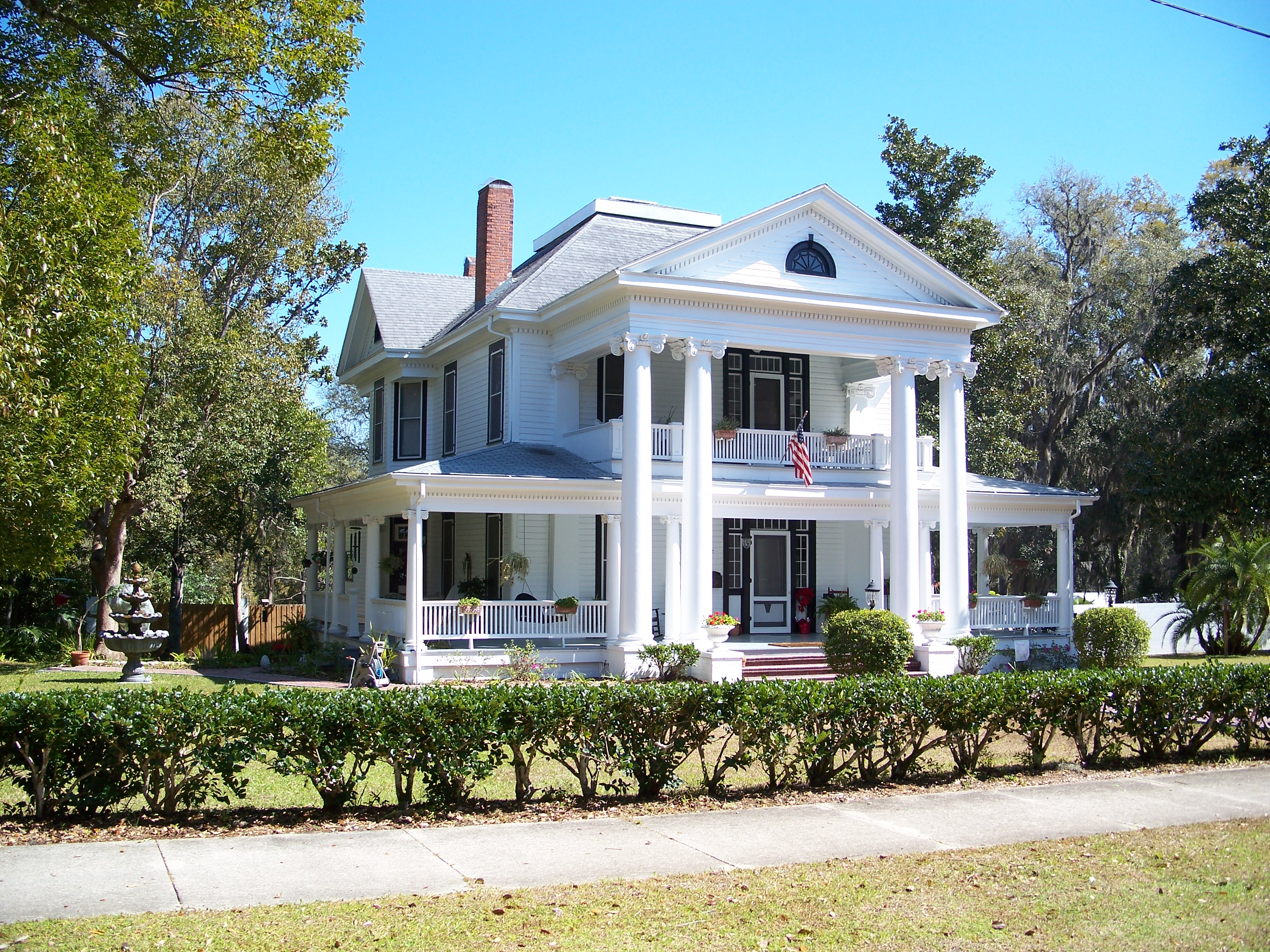
Coogler House

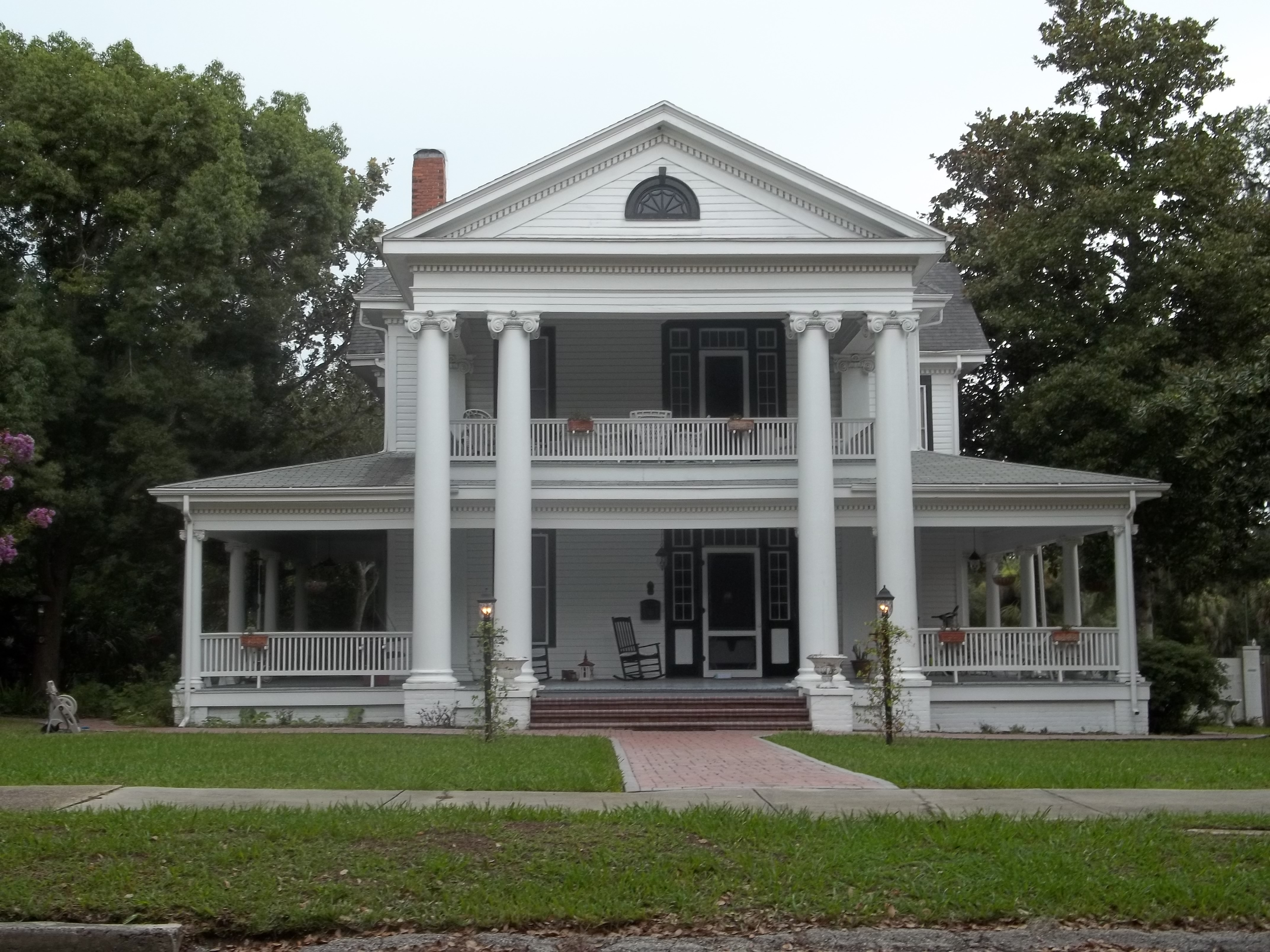
Coogler House

The T.S. Coogler House is a historic residence in Brooksville, Florida that belonged to pioneering educator and lawyer T.S. Coogler (Theodore Sylvestor Coogler). The home later belonged to Judge Monroe Treiman. It is located at 133 South Brooksville Avenue. The Colonial Revival architecture house has two-story columns. It is part of the South Brooksville Avenue Historic District.

Brooksville's second courthouse may have been built with lumber from Coogler's mill.
