= Halifax Drive Historic District =

- Formerly listed on the U.S. National Register of Historic Places
- Former U.S. Historic district
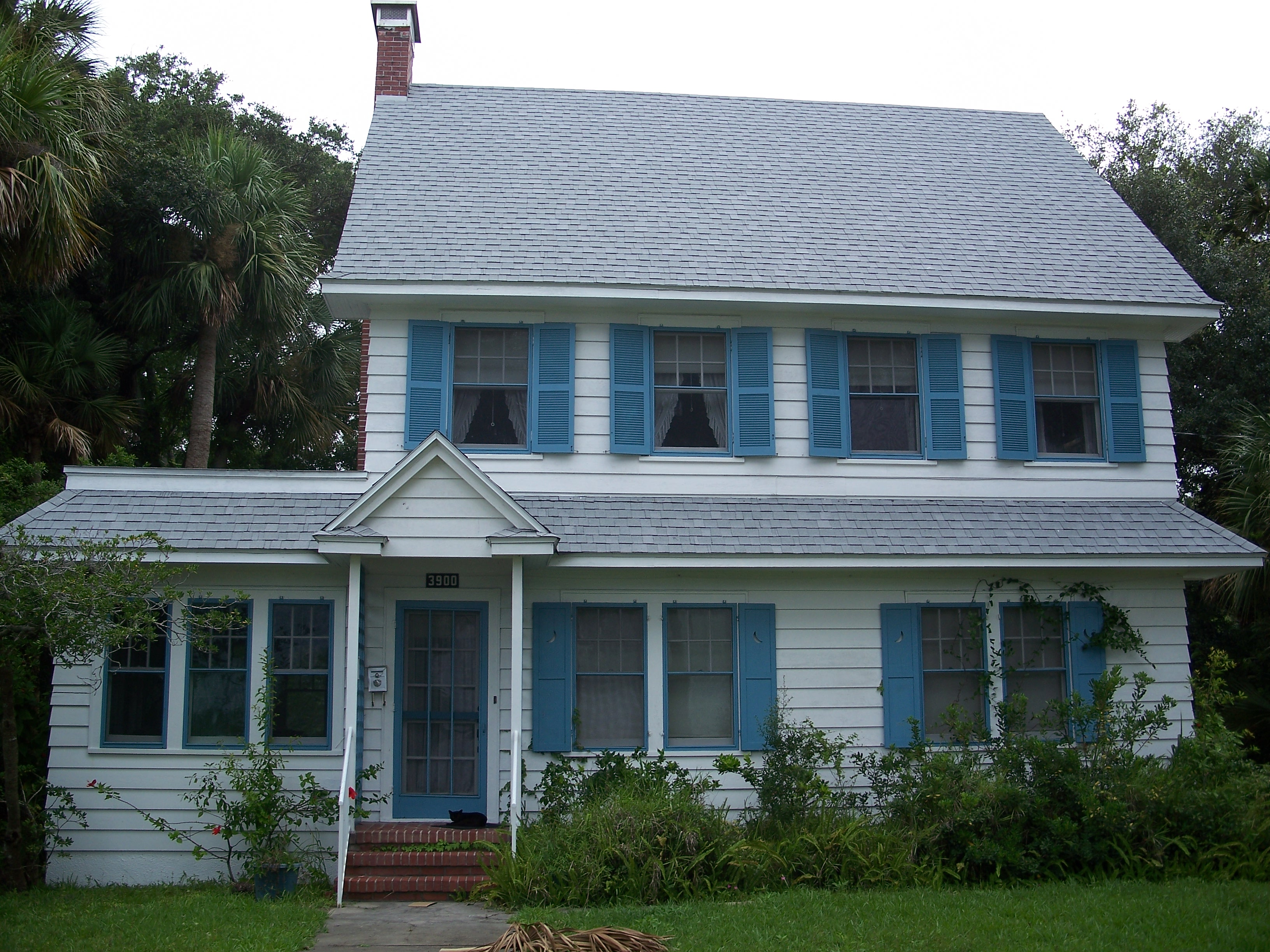
- House in the district

- Location within Volusia County
- Location: Port Orange, Florida
- Coordinates: 29°8′37″N 80°59′11″W
- Area: 40 acres (0.16 km^{2})
- NRHP reference No.: 98000056

Significant dates
- Added to NRHP: February 5, 1998
- Removed from NRHP: January 29, 2009

The Halifax Drive Historic District was a U.S. historic district (designated as such on February 5, 1998) located in Port Orange, Florida. The district ran roughly along Halifax Drive from Dunlawton to Herbert Street. It contained 17 historic buildings.

On January 29, 2009, it was removed from the National Register.

== Gallery ==
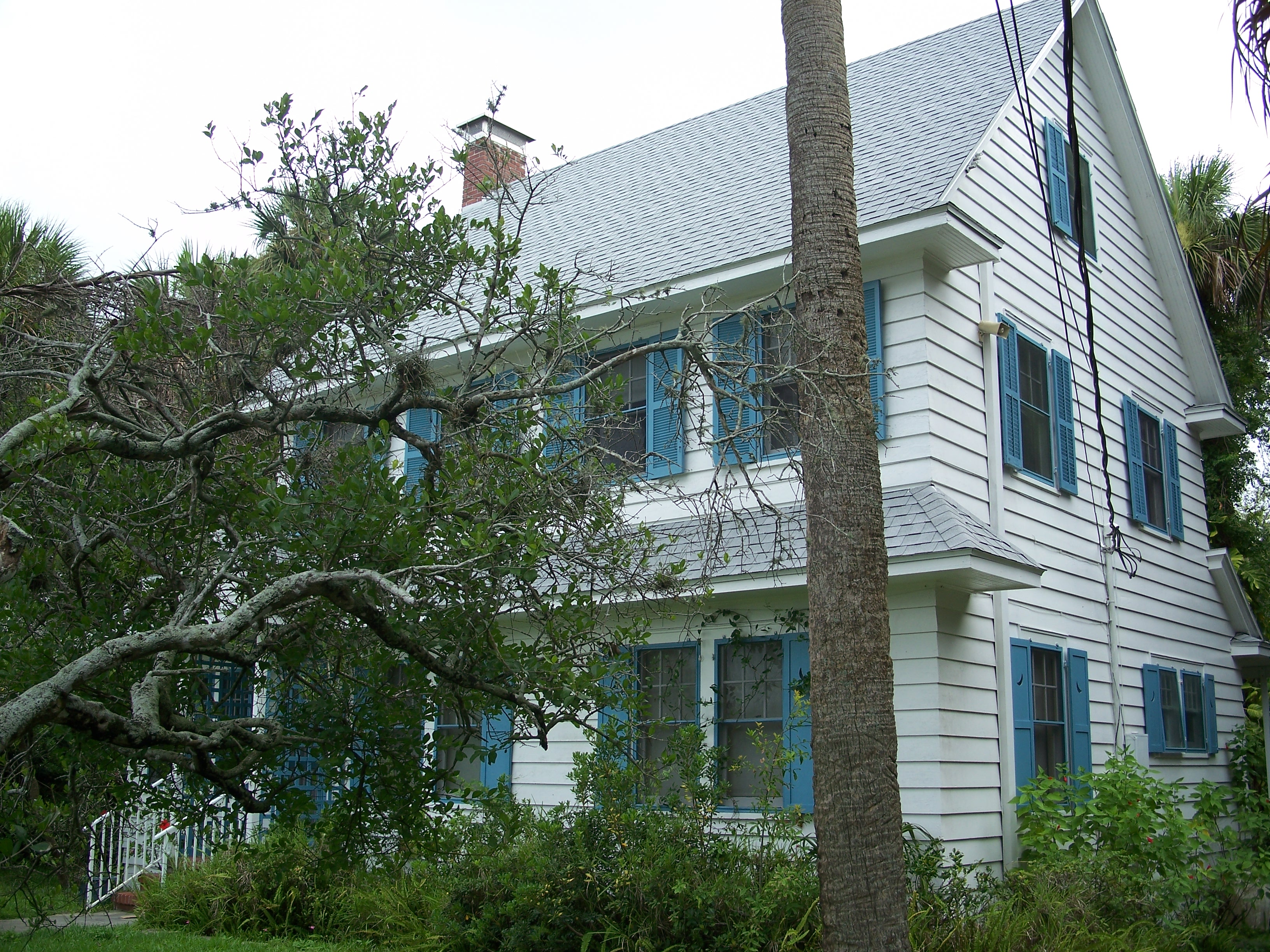

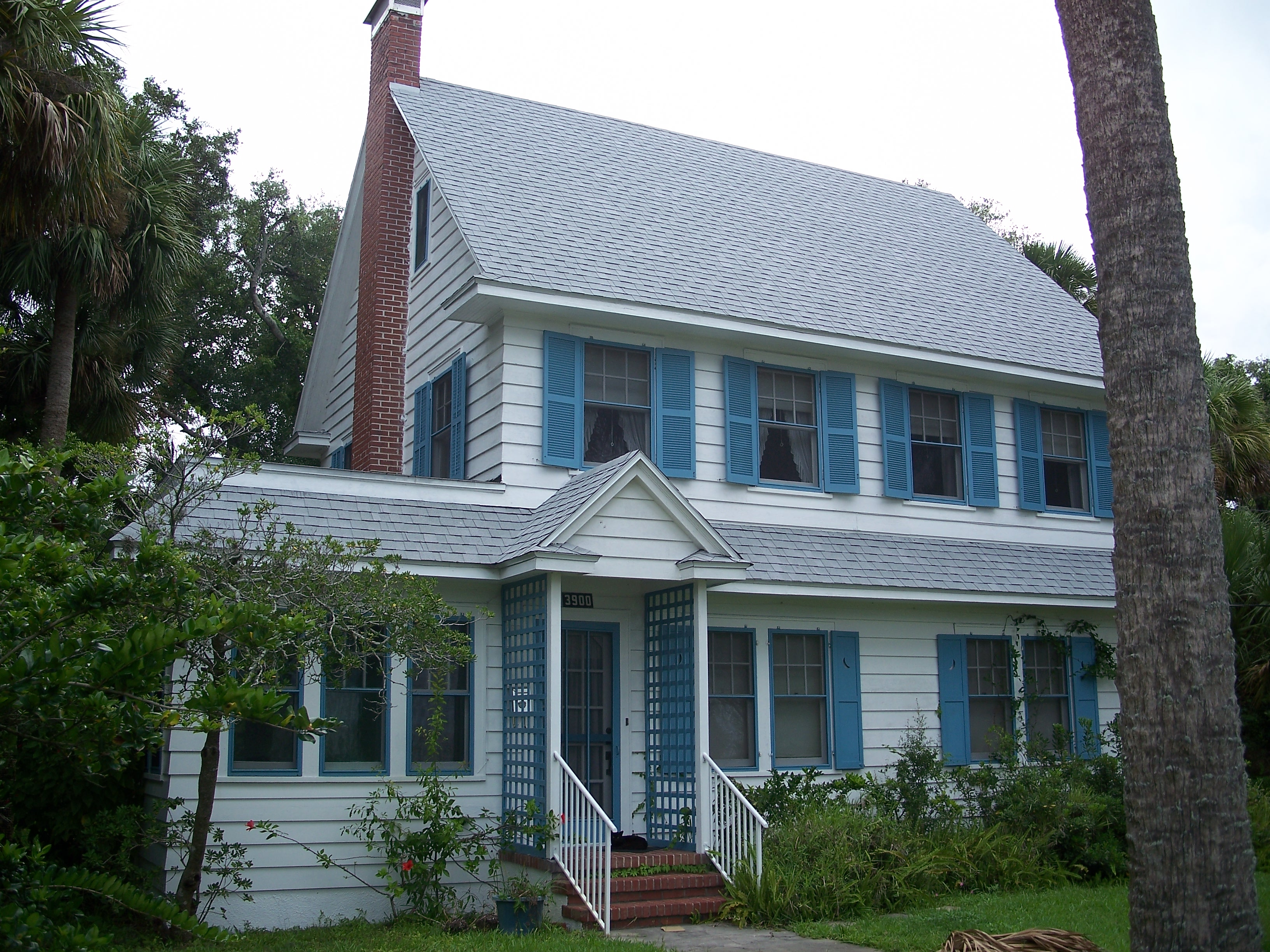
