= South Brooksville Avenue Historic District =

Historic district in Florida, United States

- U.S. National Register of Historic Places
- U.S. Historic district
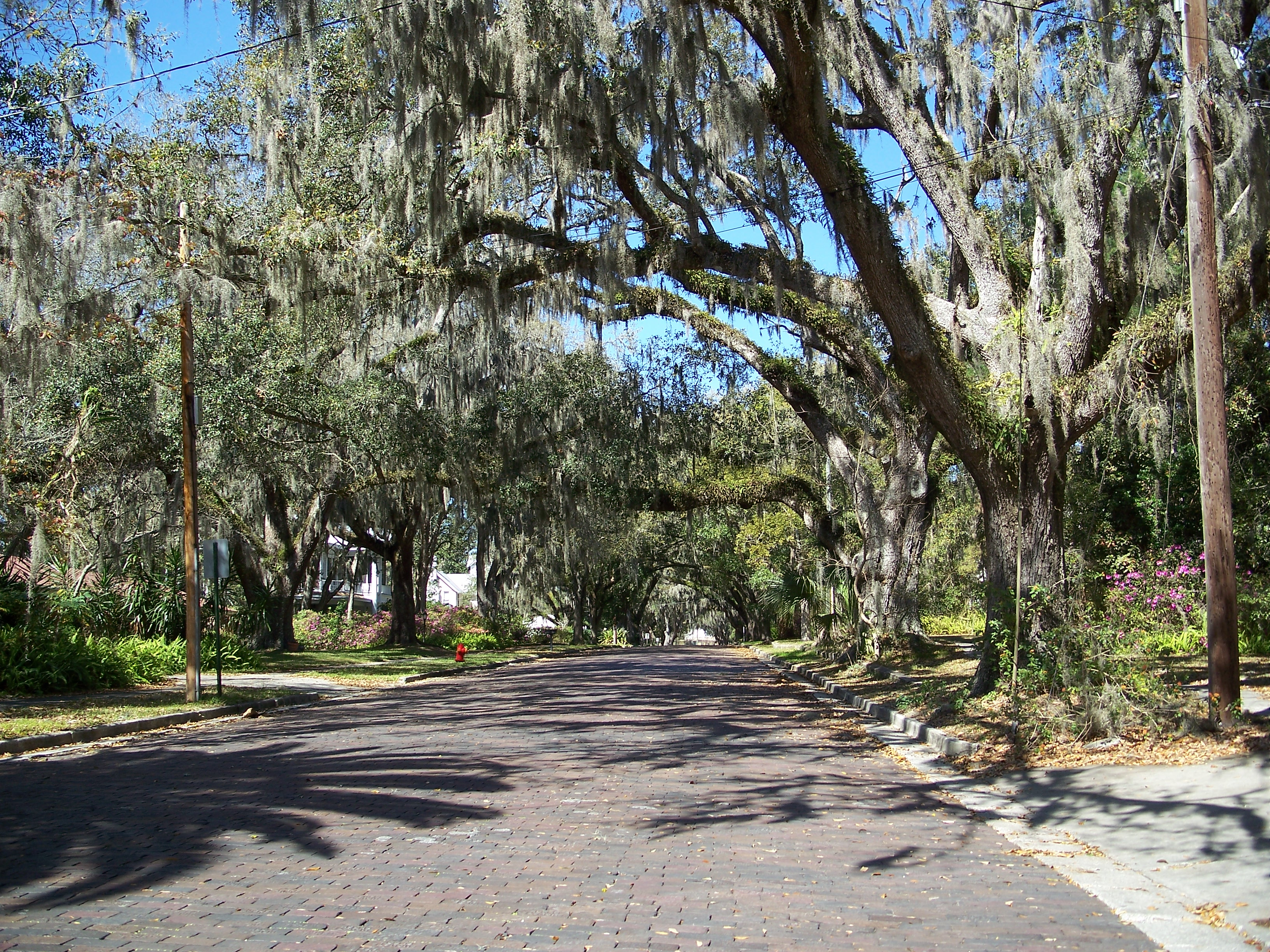
- Looking north into the district

- Location within Florida Location within the United States
- Location: Brooksville, Florida
- Coordinates: 29°55′21″N 82°42′48″W
- Area: 40 acres (160,000 m^{2})
- Built: 1901-1944
- Architectural style: Queen Anne, Classical Revival, Bungalow, Mission Style
- NRHP reference No.: 98001203
- Added to NRHP: September 25, 1998

The South Brooksville Avenue Historic District is a U.S. Historic District (designated as such on September 25, 1998) located in Brooksville, Florida. The district is on South Brooksville Avenue, from Liberty Street to Early Avenue. It contains 17 historic buildings.

Historic homes on South Brooksville Avenue include:

- Coogler House at 133 S Brooksville Avenue
- Frazee House at 302 S Brooksville Avenue
- Maillis House at 312 South Brooksville Avenue

== Gallery ==
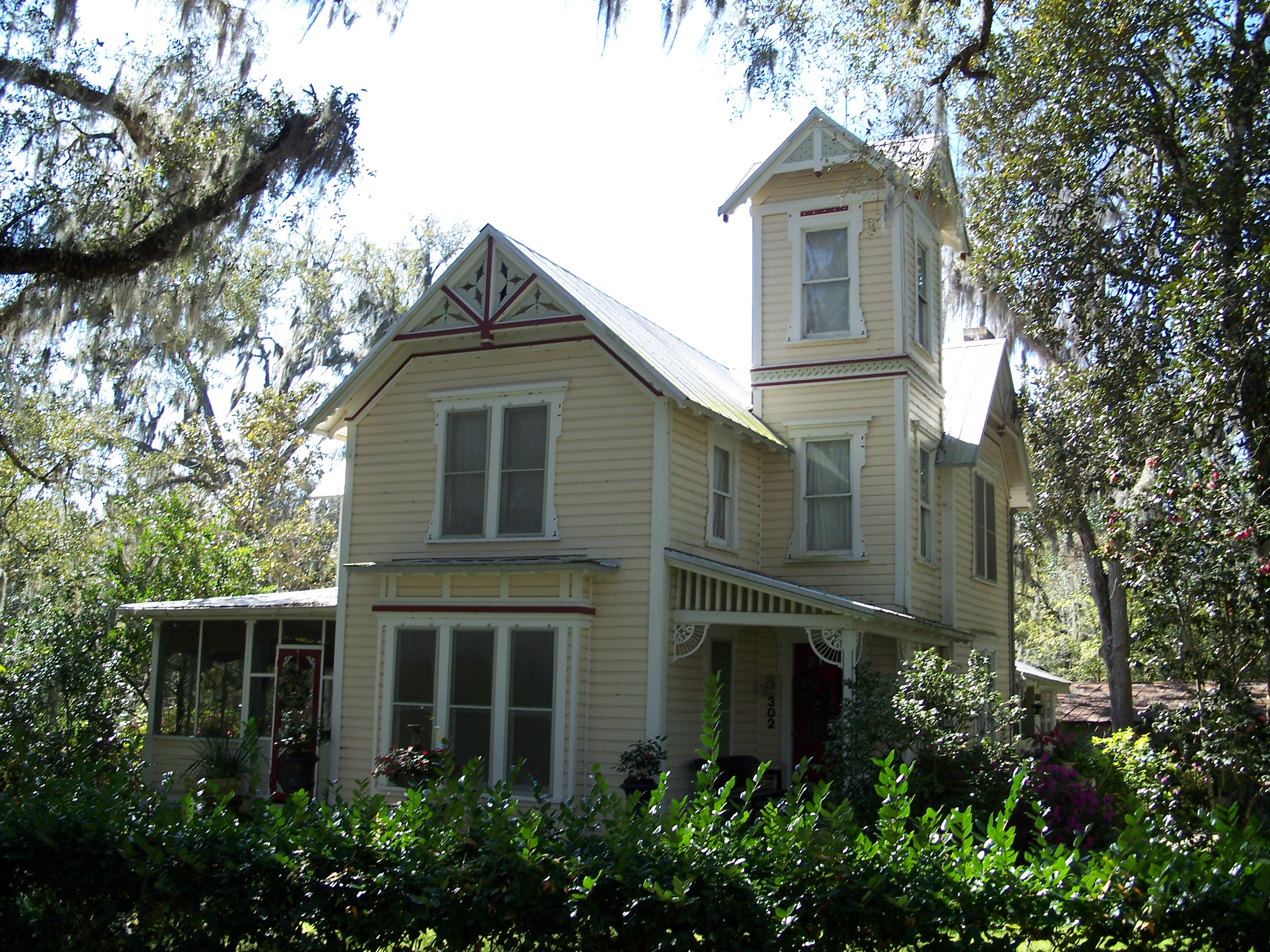
Frazee House.

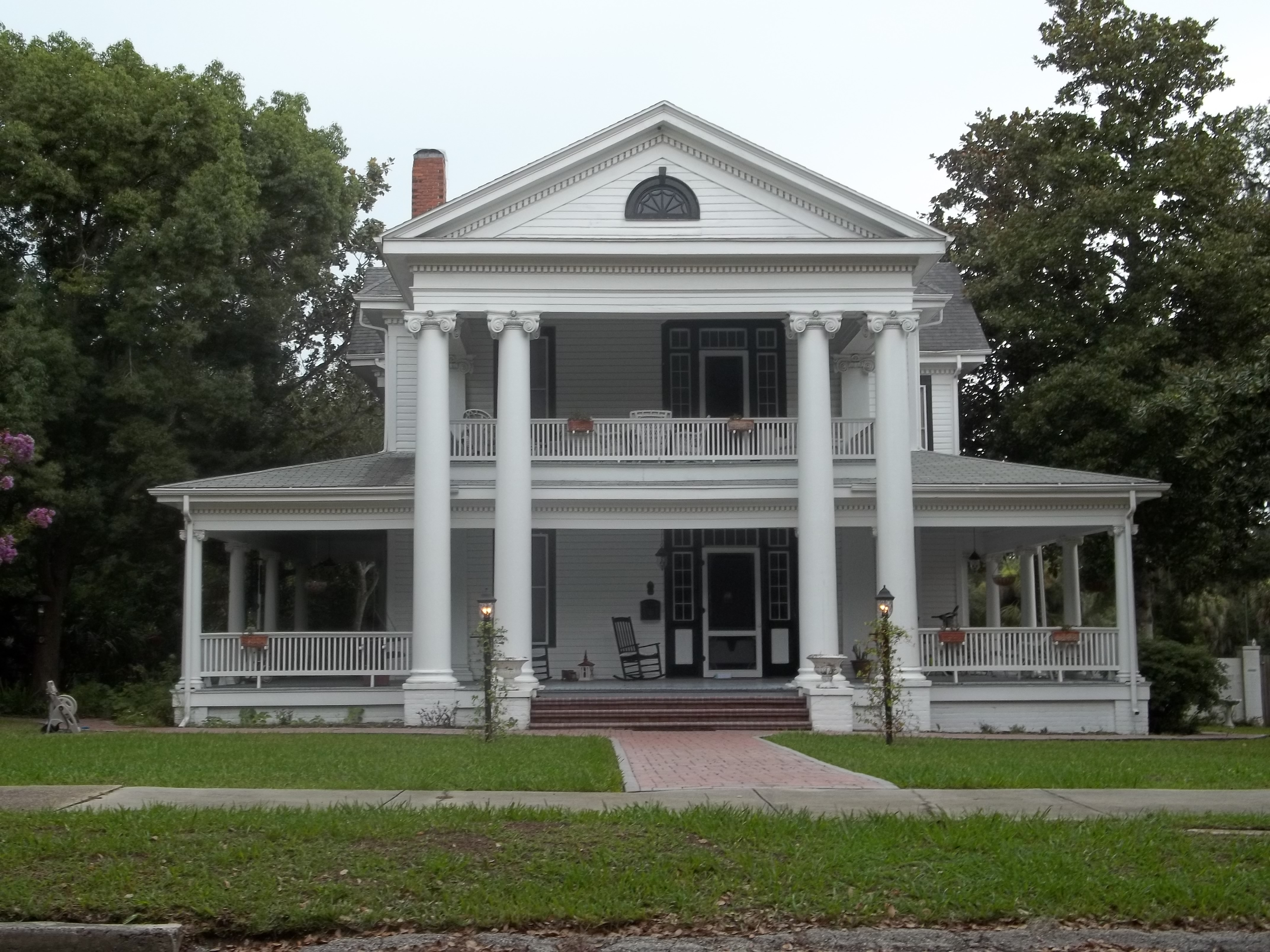
Coogler House.

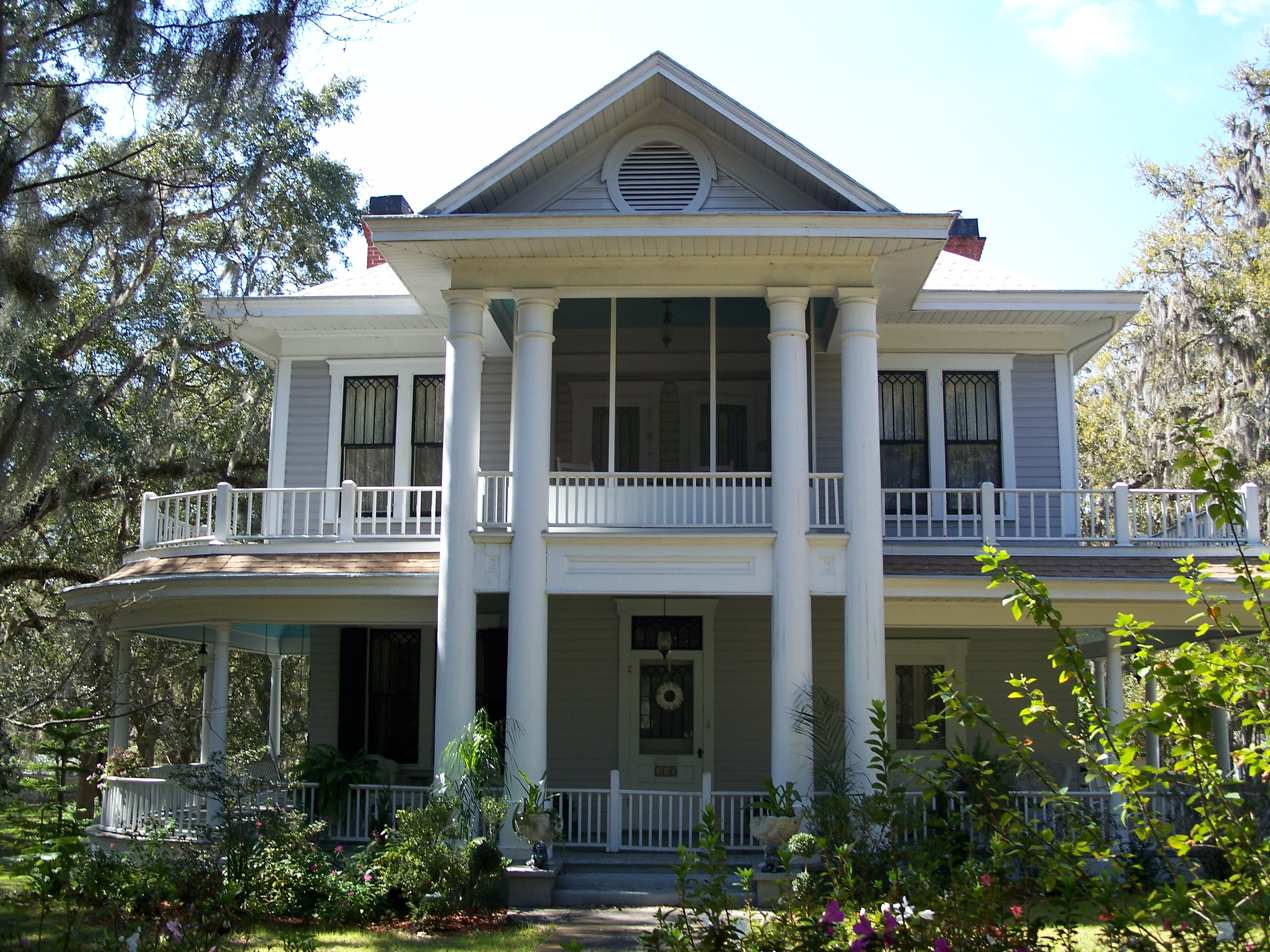
Maillis House at 312 South Brooksville Avenue.

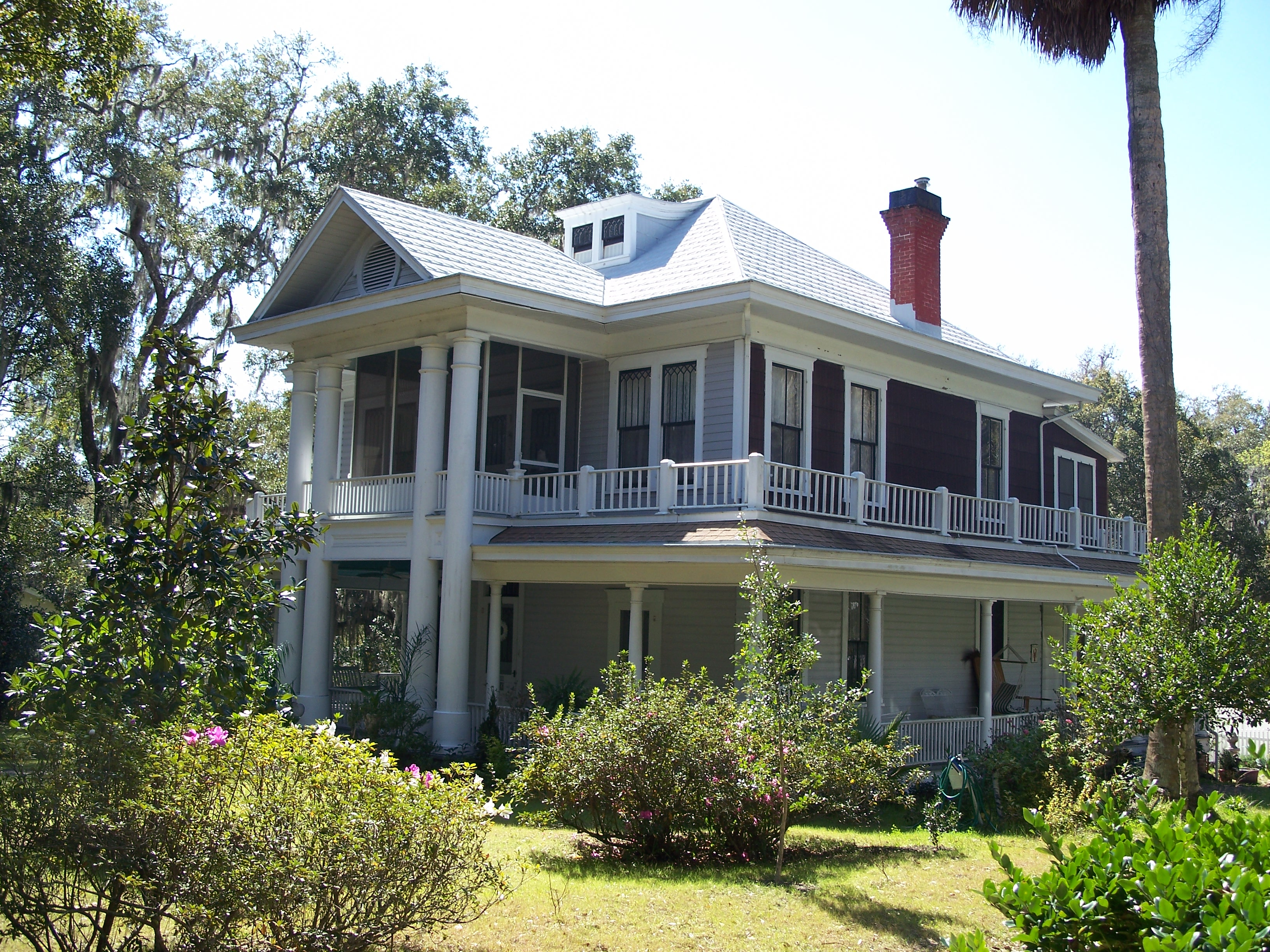
Maillis House side view
