= Downtown LaBelle Historic District =

Historic district in Florida, United States

- U.S. National Register of Historic Places
- U.S. Historic district
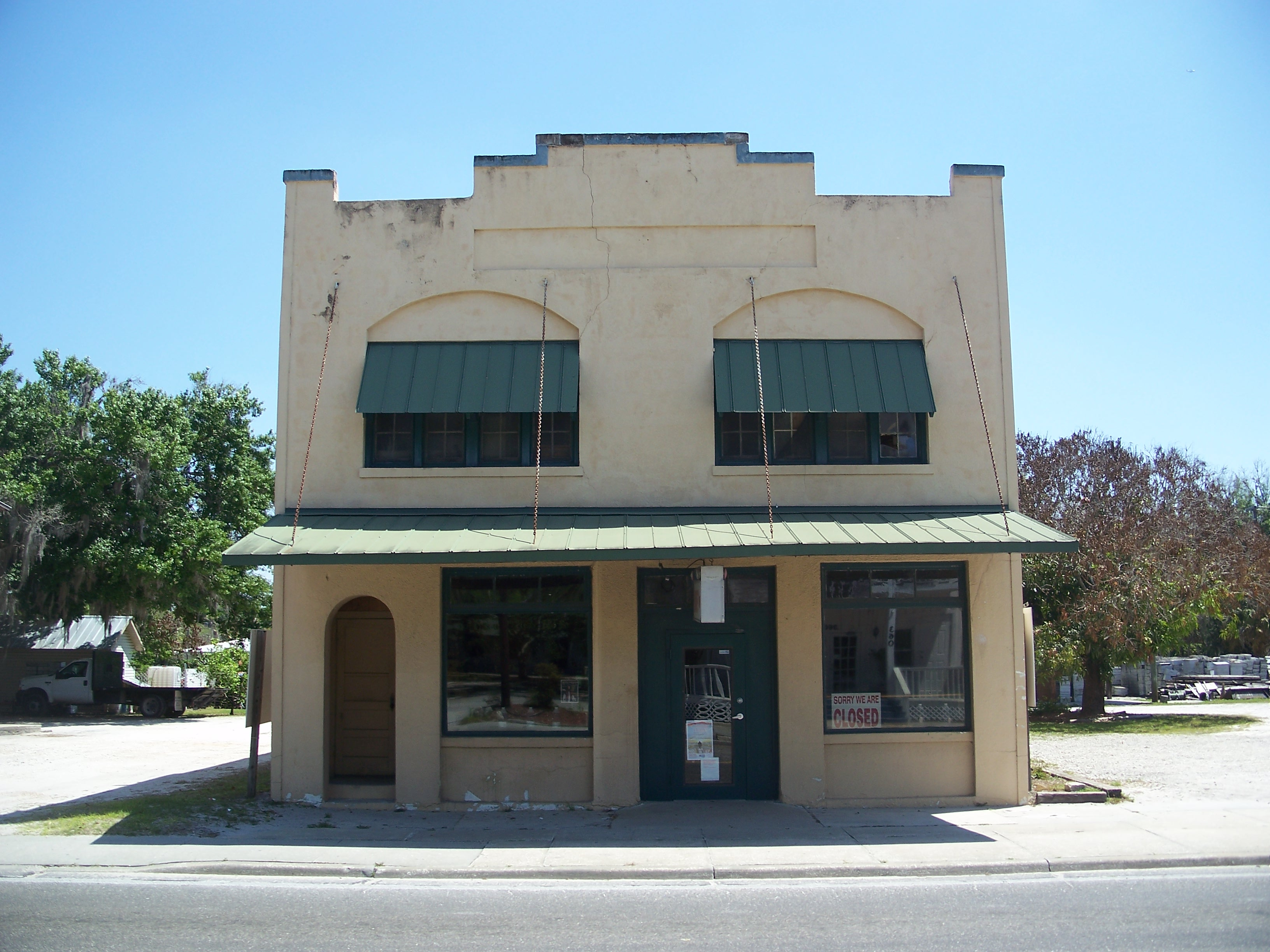

- Location within Florida Location within the United States
- Location: 300 Block of N. Bridge St., LaBelle, Florida
- Coordinates: 26°45′59″N 81°26′15″W
- Area: 3 acres (1.2 ha)
- NRHP reference No.: 99000371
- Added to NRHP: March 25, 1999

The Downtown LaBelle Historic District is a U.S. historic district (designated as such on March 25, 1999) located in LaBelle, Florida. The district is on the 300 Block of North Bridge Street. It contains 9 historic buildings.
