= Ann Stevens House =

Historic house in Florida, United States

- U.S. National Register of Historic Places
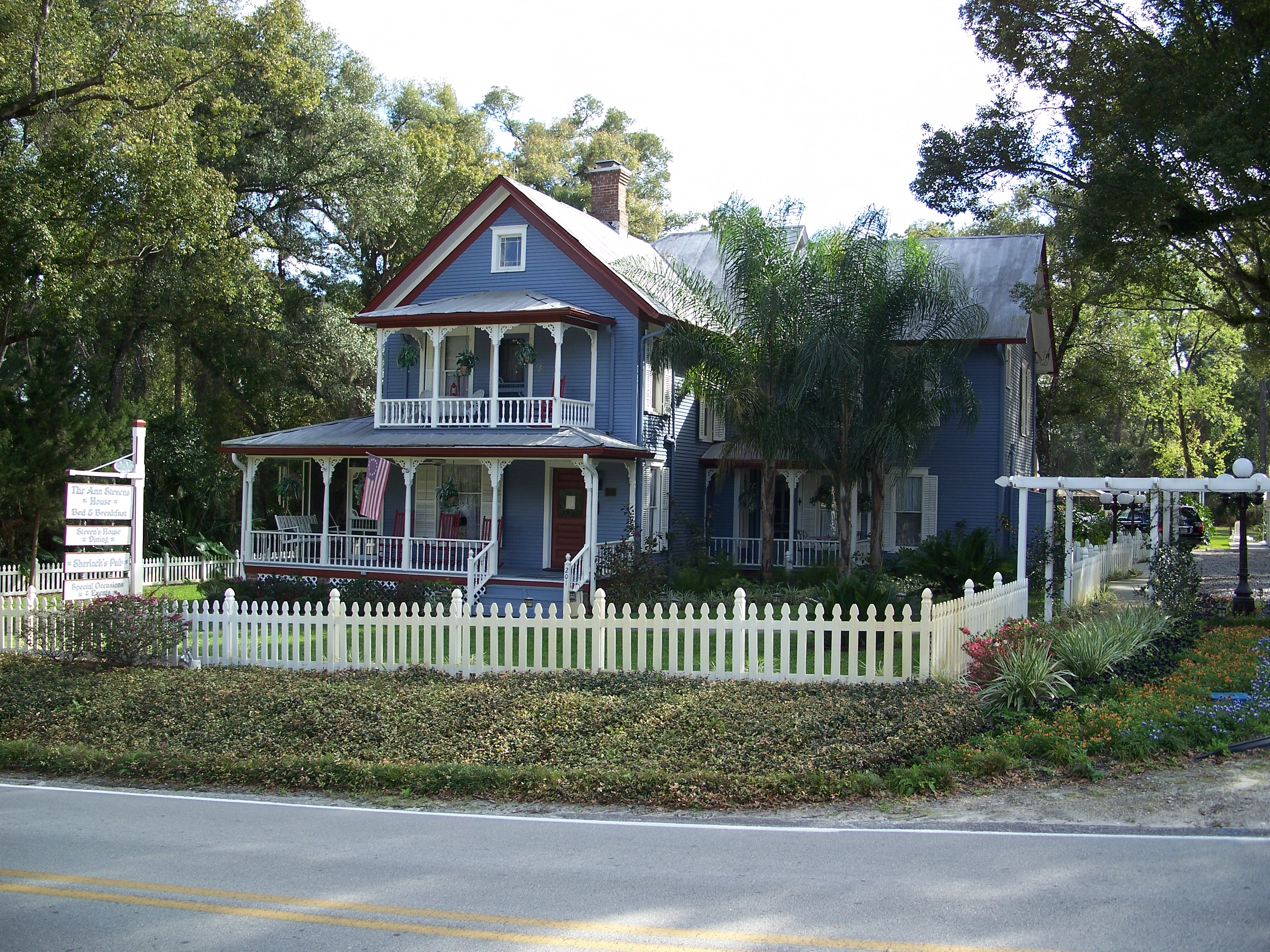

- Location within Volusia County
- Location: Lake Helen, Florida United States
- Coordinates: 28°58′11″N 81°14′00″W
- Built: 1895
- Architectural style: Frame Vernacular
- NRHP reference No.: 93000734
- Added to NRHP: August 18, 1993

The Ann Stevens House is a historic home in Lake Helen, Florida, United States. It is located at 201 East Kicklighter Road. On August 18, 1993, it was added to the U.S. National Register of Historic Places.

== Gallery ==
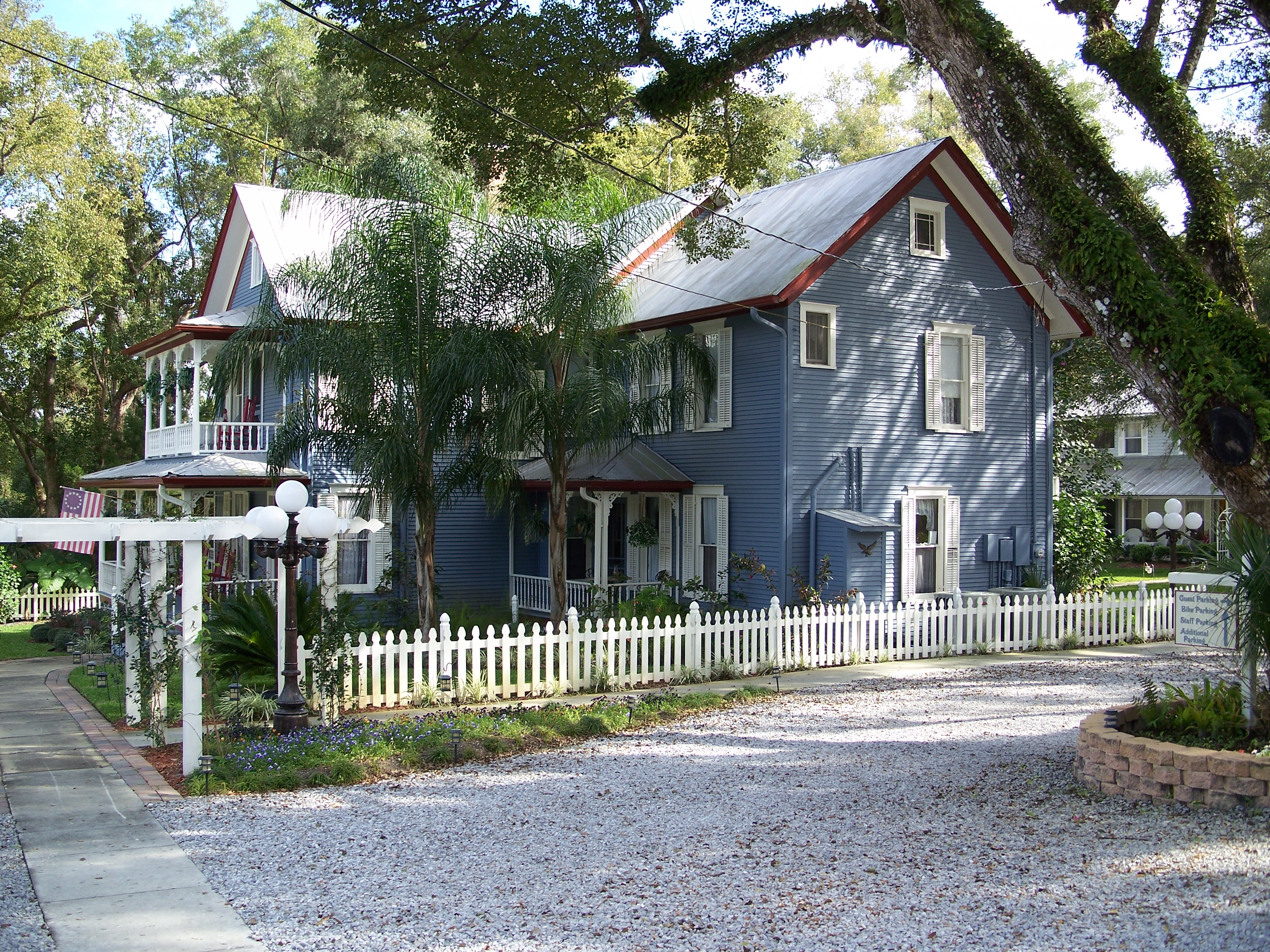
Side view
