= Persimmon Mound =

- U.S. National Register of Historic Places
- Location within Florida Location within the United States
- Location: Brevard County, Florida
- Nearest city: Rockledge
- Coordinates: 28°13′8.162″N 80°51′5.624″W
- MPS: Archeological Resources in the Upper St. Johns River Valley MPS
- NRHP reference No.: 94000357
- Added to NRHP: April 14, 1994

The Persimmon Mound is a historic site near Rockledge, Florida, located approximately 10 miles southwest of Rockledge on the east bank of a former channel of the St. Johns River. On 14 April 1994 it was added to the U.S. National Register of Historic Places.

It is located in the River Lakes Conservation Area, managed by the St. Johns River Water Management District.

== See also ==
- List of burial mounds in the United States
- National Register of Historic Places Multiple Property Submissions in Florida
