= Strawn Historic Sawmill District =

Historic district in Florida, United States

- U.S. National Register of Historic Places
- U.S. Historic district
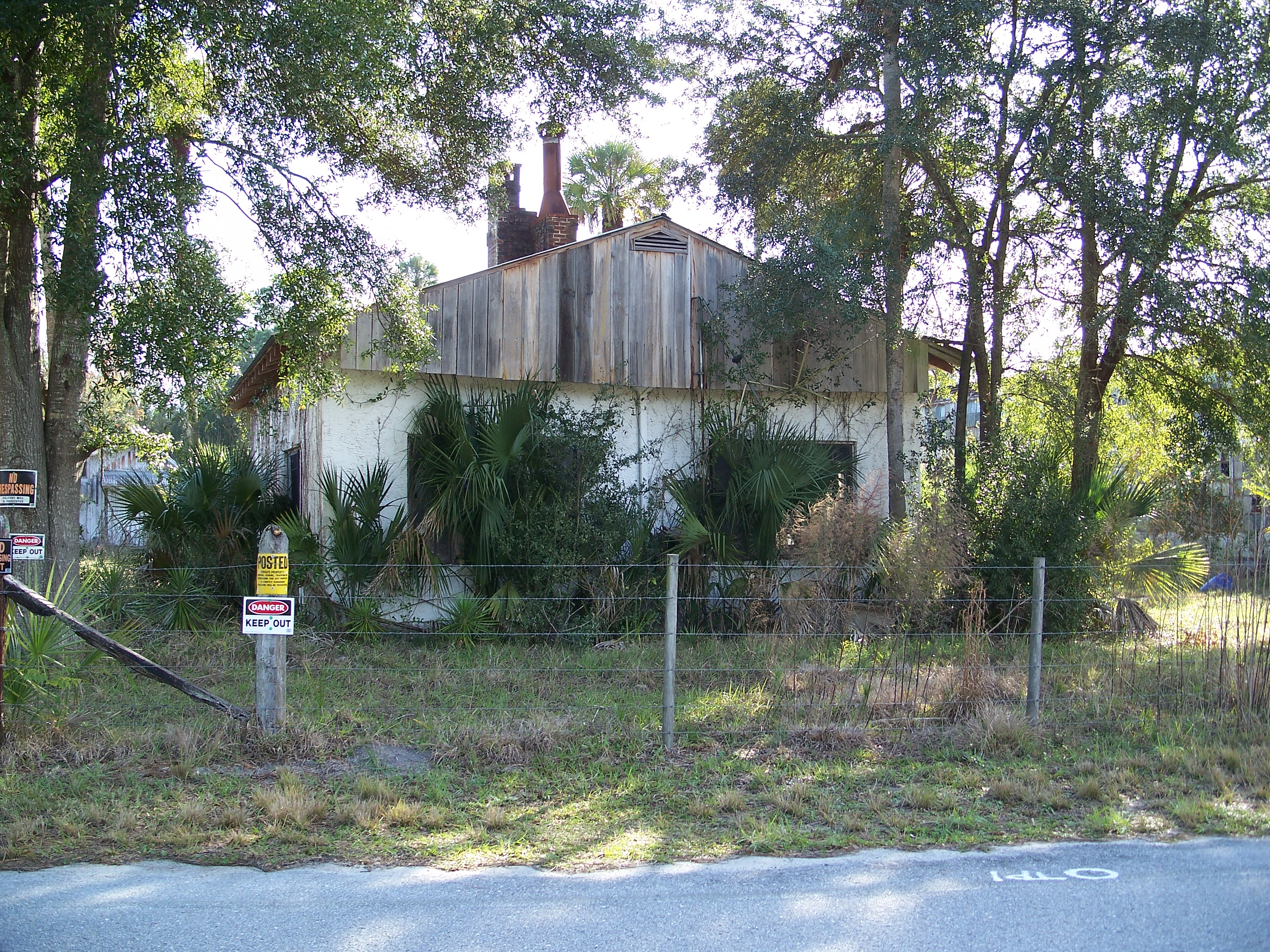
- Building in the District

- Location within Volusia County
- Location: DeLeon Springs, Florida, USA
- Coordinates: 29°8′18″N 81°21′38″W
- Area: 20 acres (0.081 km^{2})
- MPS: Citrus Industry Resources of Theodore Strawn, Inc., MPS
- NRHP reference No.: 93000930
- Added to NRHP: September 13, 1993

The Strawn Historic Sawmill District is a U.S. historic district (designated as such on September 13, 1993) located in DeLeon Springs, Florida. The district is at 5710 Lake Winona Road. It contains 3 historic buildings.
