= Sinclair Service Station (Spring Hill, Florida) =

- U.S. National Register of Historic Places
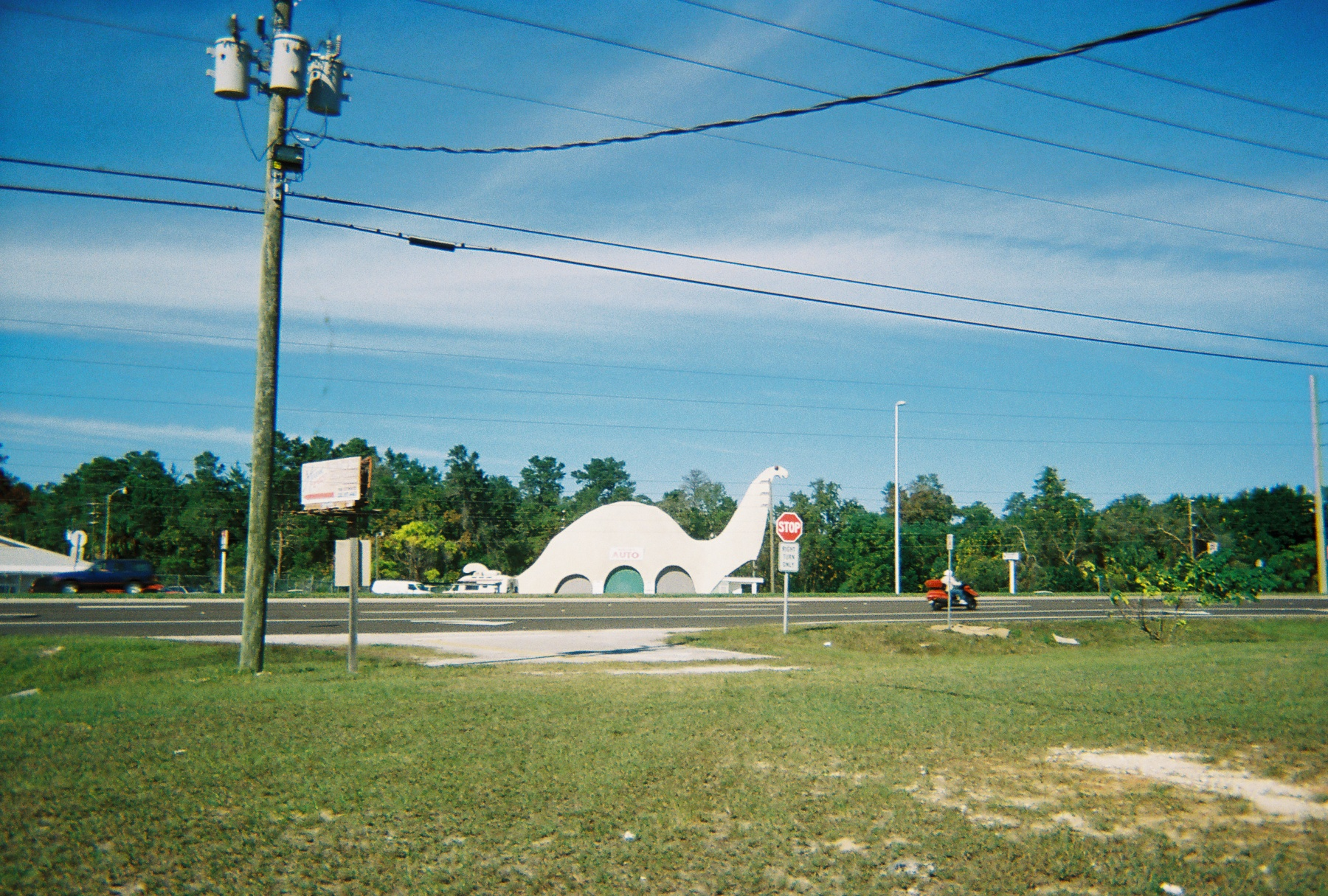
- Harold's Garage the former Sinclair station as seen from across US 19 in 2009.

- Location within Florida Location within the United States
- Location: Spring Hill, Florida
- Coordinates: 28°30′19″N 82°35′43″W
- NRHP reference No.: 100005385
- Added to NRHP: July 27, 2020

The Sinclair Service Station is a national historic site located at 5299 Commercial Way, Spring Hill, Florida in Hernando County.

It was added to the National Register of Historic Places on July 27, 2020.

== History ==
The Sinclair Service Station was built by the Sinclair Oil Corporation in 1964. The gas station's roof design was based on the company logo, which was a Brontosaurus-like dinosaur. It is 47 feet tall and 110 feet long.

In 1967, Harold Hurst bought the station, after which it became Harold's Auto Center. While in the area filming Larry the Cable Guy's show in 2014 at Weeki Wachee Springs (which was also added to the National Register in 2020), his crew saw the station. They decided to shoot a segment there.
