= Roberts Farm Historic and Archeological District =

Historic district in Florida, United States

- U.S. National Register of Historic Places
- U.S. Historic district
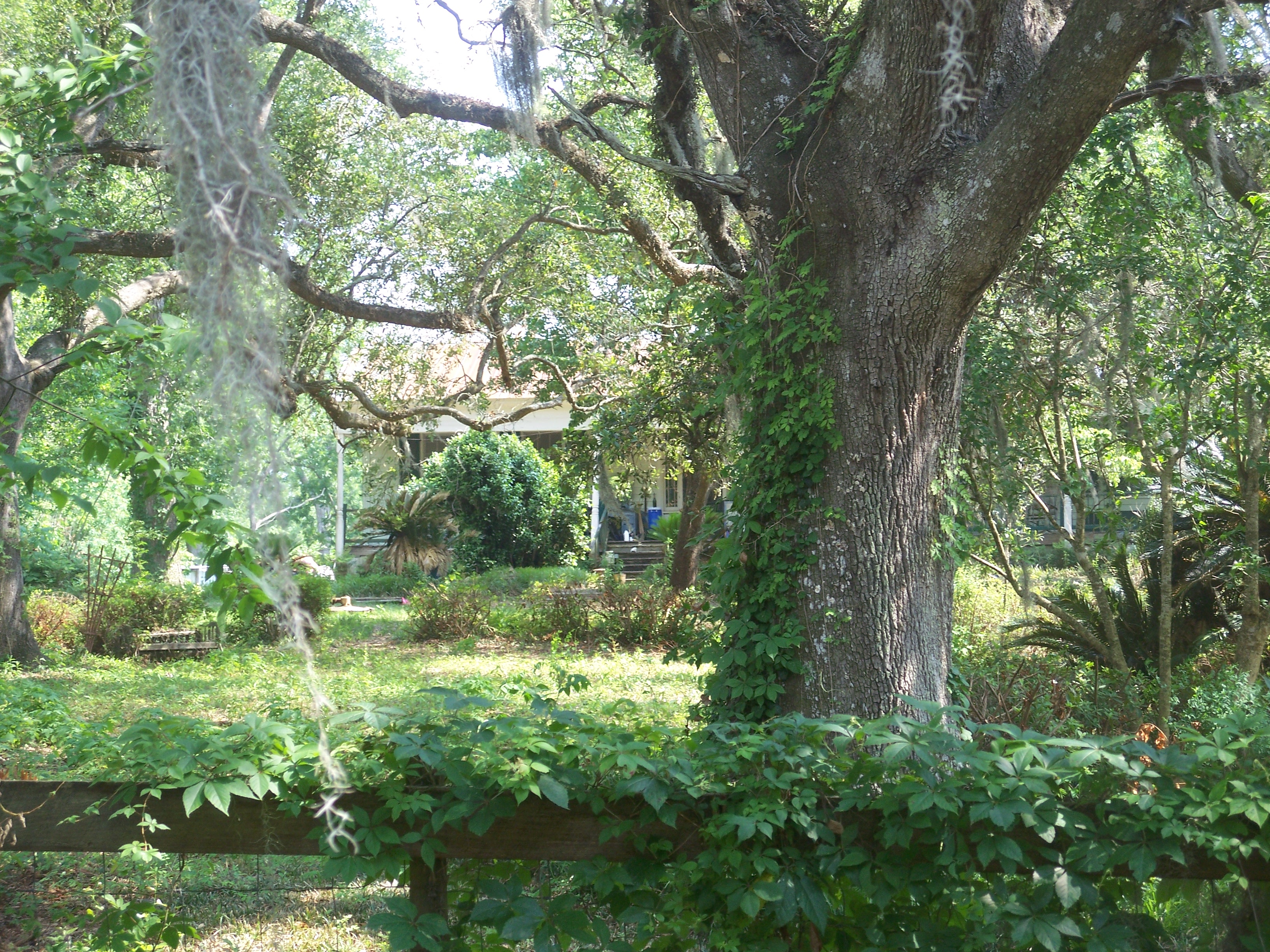

- Location within Florida Location within the United States
- Location: Tallahassee, Florida
- Coordinates: 30°32′0″N 84°9′27″W
- Area: 100 acres (0.40 km^{2})
- Architectural style: Greek Revival
- NRHP reference No.: 95001186
- Added to NRHP: November 2, 1995

The Roberts Farm Historic and Archeological District (also known as the Theus-Roberts Farm) is a U.S. historic district (designated as such on November 2, 1995) located in Tallahassee, Florida. The district is on Roberts Road, 1-mile (2 km) east of Centerville Road.

== History ==
The Roberts Farm was founded in 1803 by the Roberts family as a crop and dairy farm.

== Current Day ==
The farm is currently in the process of being re-conserved by two sisters, one of which has been living in the family house and the other is in the process of building a tiny house.

They have goats, horses, fowl, and farm dogs and have been renting off plots of land for gardens.
