= Archeological Resources of the Caloosahatchee Region MPS =

- U.S. National Register of Historic Places
- Location within Florida Location within the United States
- Location: Lee County, Florida
- Coordinates: 26.58°N 81.92°W
- MPS
- NRHP reference No.: 64500095

The following buildings were added to the National Register of Historic Places as part of the Archeological Resources of the Caloosahatchee Region Multiple Property Submission (or MPS).

Resource Name	Also known as	Address	City	County	Added
Galt Island Archeological District		Address Restricted	St. James City	Lee County	May 21, 1996
Josslyn Island Site		Address Restricted	Pineland	Lee County	December 14, 1978
Mound Key Site		Address Restricted	Fort Myers Beach	Lee County	August 12, 1970
Mark Pardo Shellworks Site		Address Restricted	Bokeelia	Lee County	May 21, 1996
Pineland Archeological District		Address Restricted	Pineland	Lee County	November 27, 1973
Useppa Island Site		Address Restricted	Bokeelia	Lee County	May 21, 1996
