= Clewiston Historic Schools =

Historic schools in Florida, United States

- U.S. National Register of Historic Places
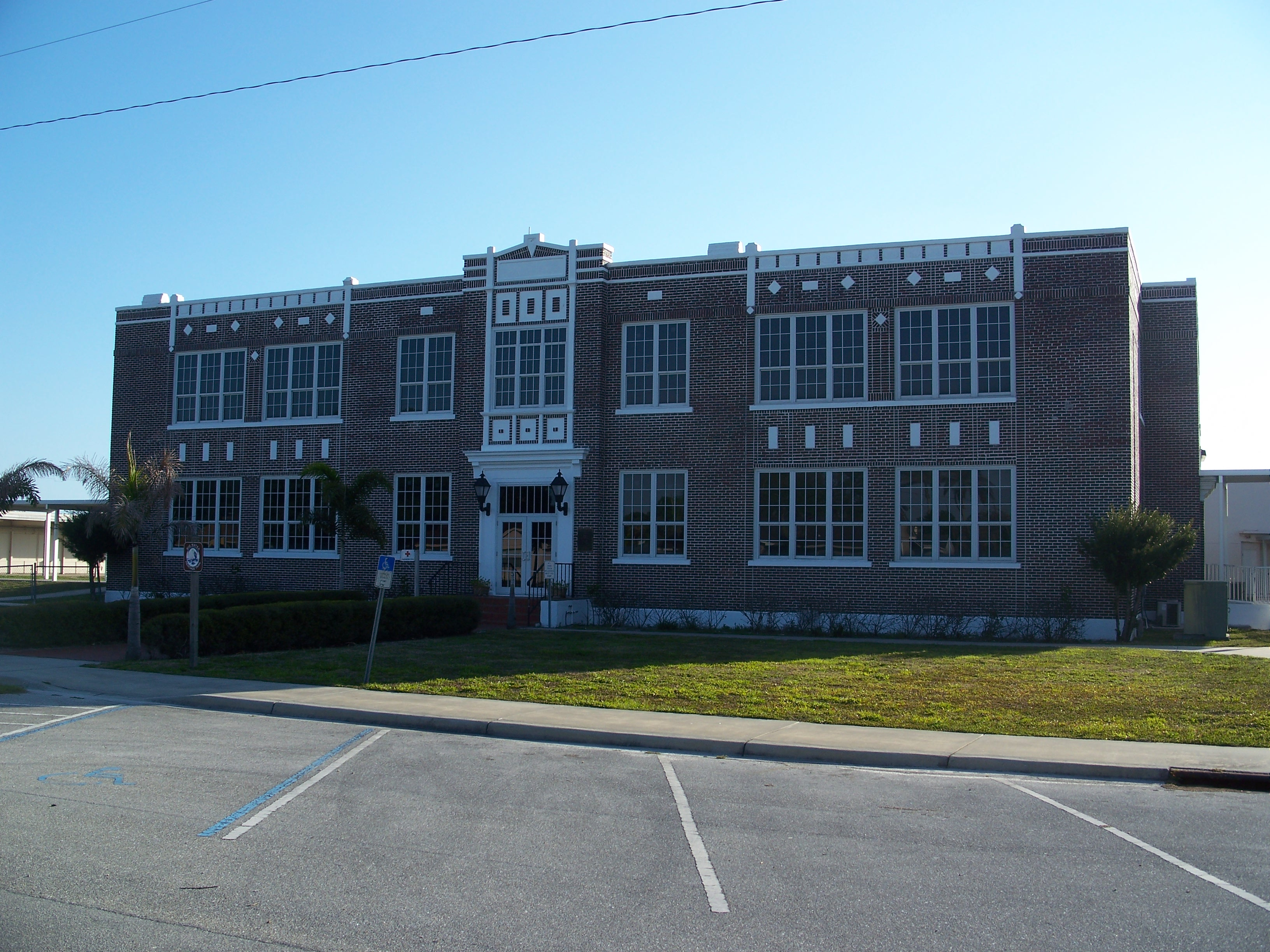

- Location within Florida Location within the United States
- Location: Clewiston, Florida
- Coordinates: 26°45′21″N 80°55′42″W
- NRHP reference No.: 97001172
- Added to NRHP: September 26, 1997

The Clewiston Historic Schools are two historic schools in Clewiston, Florida. They are located at 325 East Circle Drive and 475 East Osceola Avenue. On September 26, 1997, they were added to the U.S. National Register of Historic Places.
