= Scharnberg House =

Historic house in Florida, United States

- U.S. National Register of Historic Places
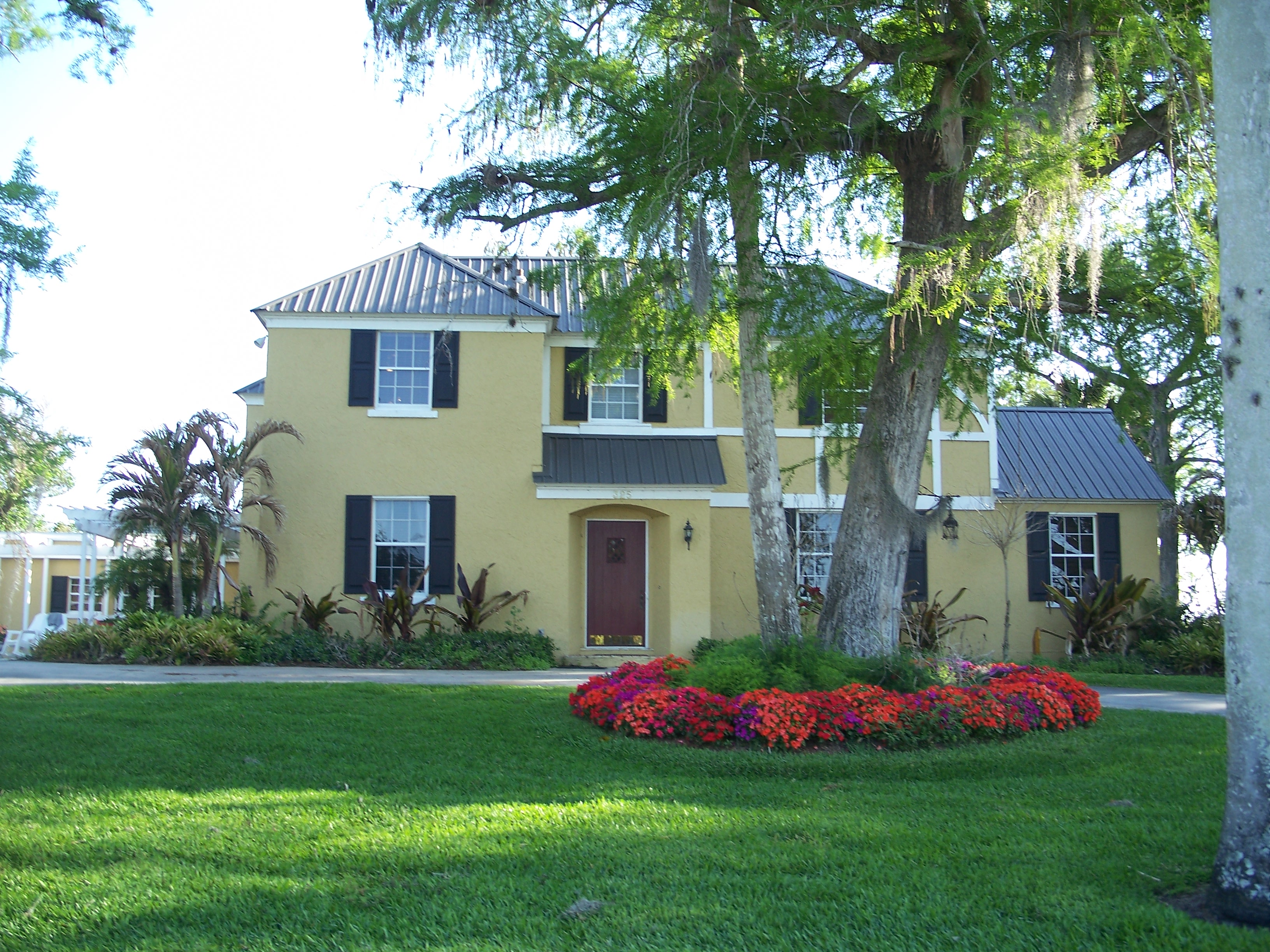

- Location within Florida Location within the United States
- Location: Clewiston, Florida
- Coordinates: 26°45′37″N 80°55′49″W
- NRHP reference No.: 99000472
- Added to NRHP: April 26, 1999

The Scharnberg House is a historic site in Clewiston, Florida. It is located at 325 East Del Monte Avenue. On April 26, 1999, it was added to the U.S. National Register of Historic Places. The building was designed by Clark J. Lawrence, a West Palm Beach architect, and was built in 1927. According to Florida's Division of Historical Resources factsheet:

"J.B. Scharnberg was a German born engineer and inventor who worked for the United States Sugar Corporation and held numerous patents for machinery innovations. Scharnberg occupied the house from 1931 to his death in 1940. At the time of his death Scharberg had developed the largest, most advanced sugar grinding mill in the world."
