= Lucienne Nielsen House =

Historic house in Florida, United States

- U.S. National Register of Historic Places
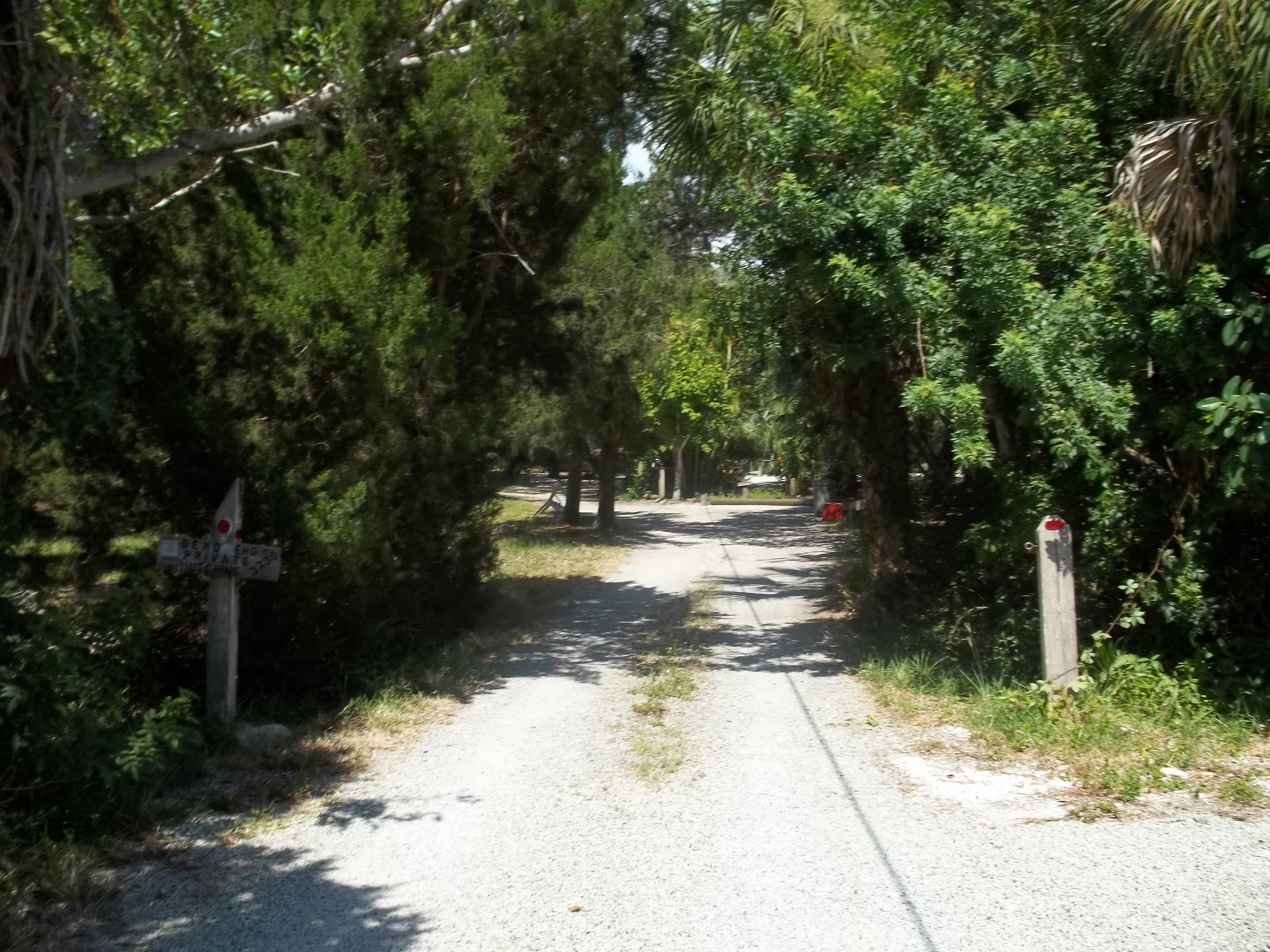

- Location within Florida Location within the United States
- Location: Nokomis, Florida
- Coordinates: 27°10′27″N 82°29′39″W
- NRHP reference No.: 07000163
- Added to NRHP: March 21, 2007

The Lucienne Nielsen House is a historic house in Nokomis, Florida, United States. It was designed by Ralph Twitchell for his wife and was built in 1956 in a Sarasota School of Architecture style featuring expansive views of its surroundings. It is located at 3730 Sandspur Lane. On March 21, 2007, it was added to the U.S. National Register of Historic Places.
