= Indian Fields =

- U.S. National Register of Historic Places
- Location within Florida Location within the United States
- Location: Brevard County, Florida
- Nearest city: Titusville
- Coordinates: 28°36′18″N 81°13′0″W
- MPS: Archeological Resources in the Upper St. Johns River Valley MPS
- NRHP reference No.: 94000358
- Added to NRHP: April 14, 1994

The Indian Fields are a collection of historic sites in Brevard County, Florida. They are located on the southeast bank of Ruth Lake, approximately eight miles west of Titusville. On April 14, 1994, they were added to the U.S. National Register of Historic Places.
