= Caldwell Home Place =

Historic house in Florida, United States

- U.S. National Register of Historic Places
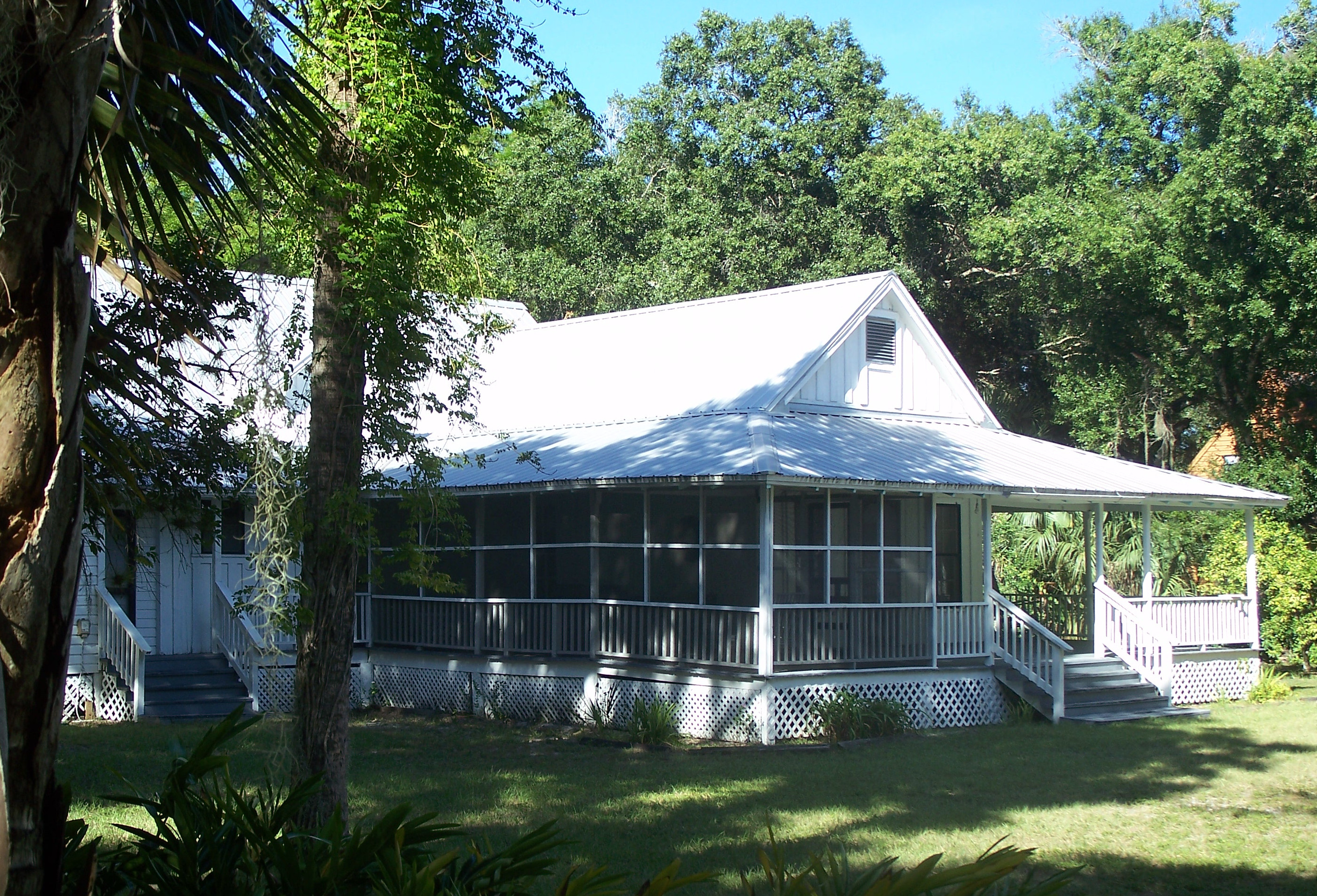

- Location within Florida Location within the United States
- Location: LaBelle, Florida
- Coordinates: 26°46′1″N 81°26′29″W
- Built: c. 1896
- Architectural style: Frame Vernacular
- NRHP reference No.: 03000009
- Added to NRHP: 13 February 2003

The Caldwell Home Place (also known as the Myer General Store or The Home Place) is a historic house located at 160 Curry Street in LaBelle, Florida.

== Description and history ==
As originally constructed around 1896, the building stood on the banks of the Caloosahatchee River to serve as a store with a mail drop and supply station for the then sparsely populated community.

It was added to the National Register of Historic Places on February 13, 2003.
