= Frank Saxon House =

Historic house in Florida, United States

- U.S. National Register of Historic Places
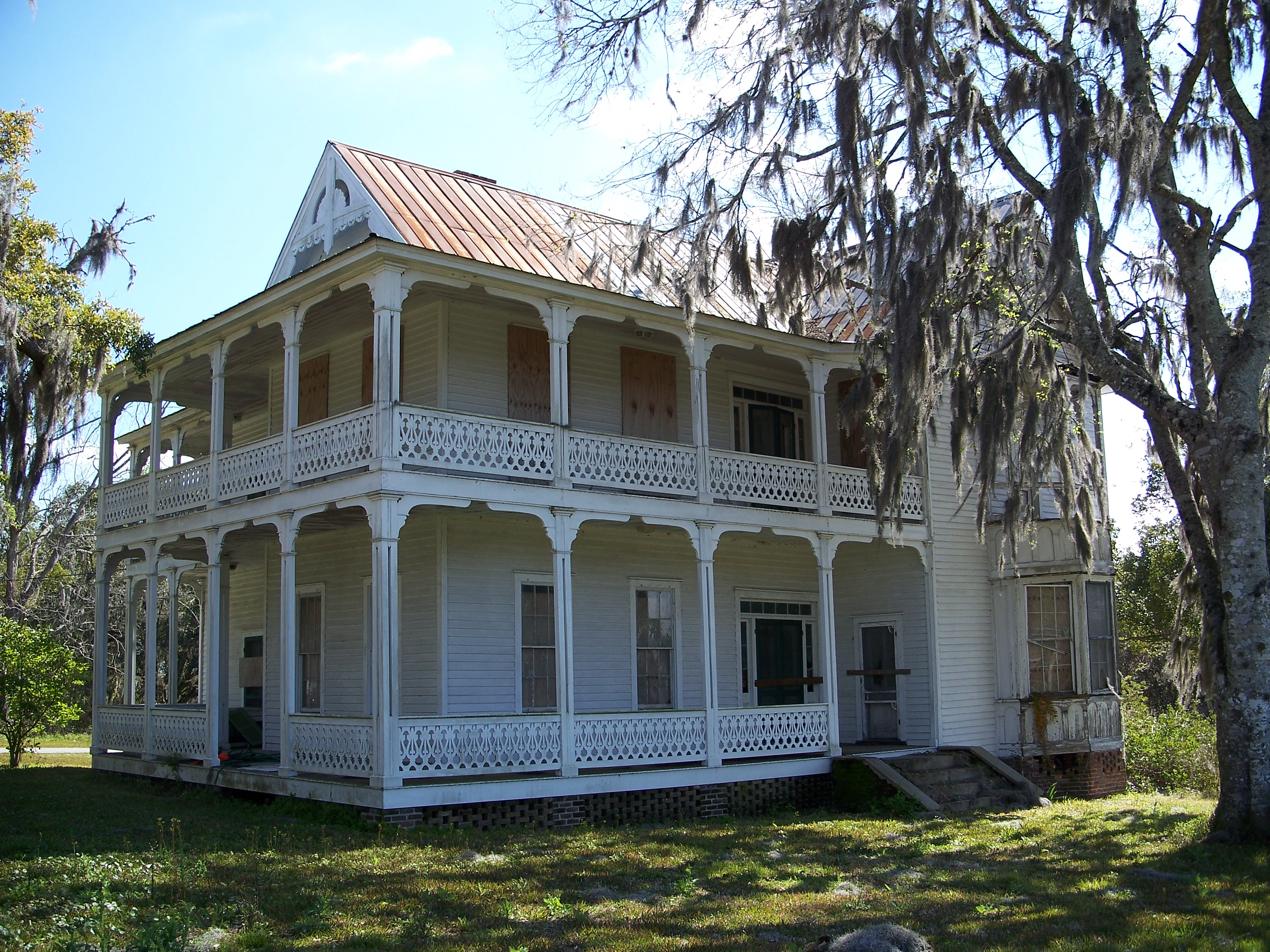

- Location within Florida Location within the United States
- Location: Brooksville, Florida
- Coordinates: 28°33′11″N 82°22′51″W
- Built: 1870s
- Architectural style: Frame Vernacular with Queen Anne Revival influence
- NRHP reference No.: 98001321
- Added to NRHP: November 5, 1998

The Frank Saxon House is a historic residence in Brooksville, Florida. The home was built by Frank Saxon in 1864 for his bride Tallulah Hope, daughter of William Hope, one of the earliest settlers in the county. Mr. Saxon was a Civil War soldier who was a member of the Hernando Wild Cats, a unit of the 3rd Regiment of the Confederate Army. After the war, Frank Saxon served as a member of the Florida Legislature representing Hernando County. The home sits on the top of a hill at 200 South Saxon Avenue. On November 5, 1998, it was added to the U.S. National Register of Historic Places.

The Frank Saxon House is one of the earliest examples of Frame Vernacular architecture with Queen Anne Revival influence in Hernando County. The exterior of the home has been renovated by the owners, but the interior is still in need of repair.
