= Spring Lake Community Center =

- U.S. National Register of Historic Places
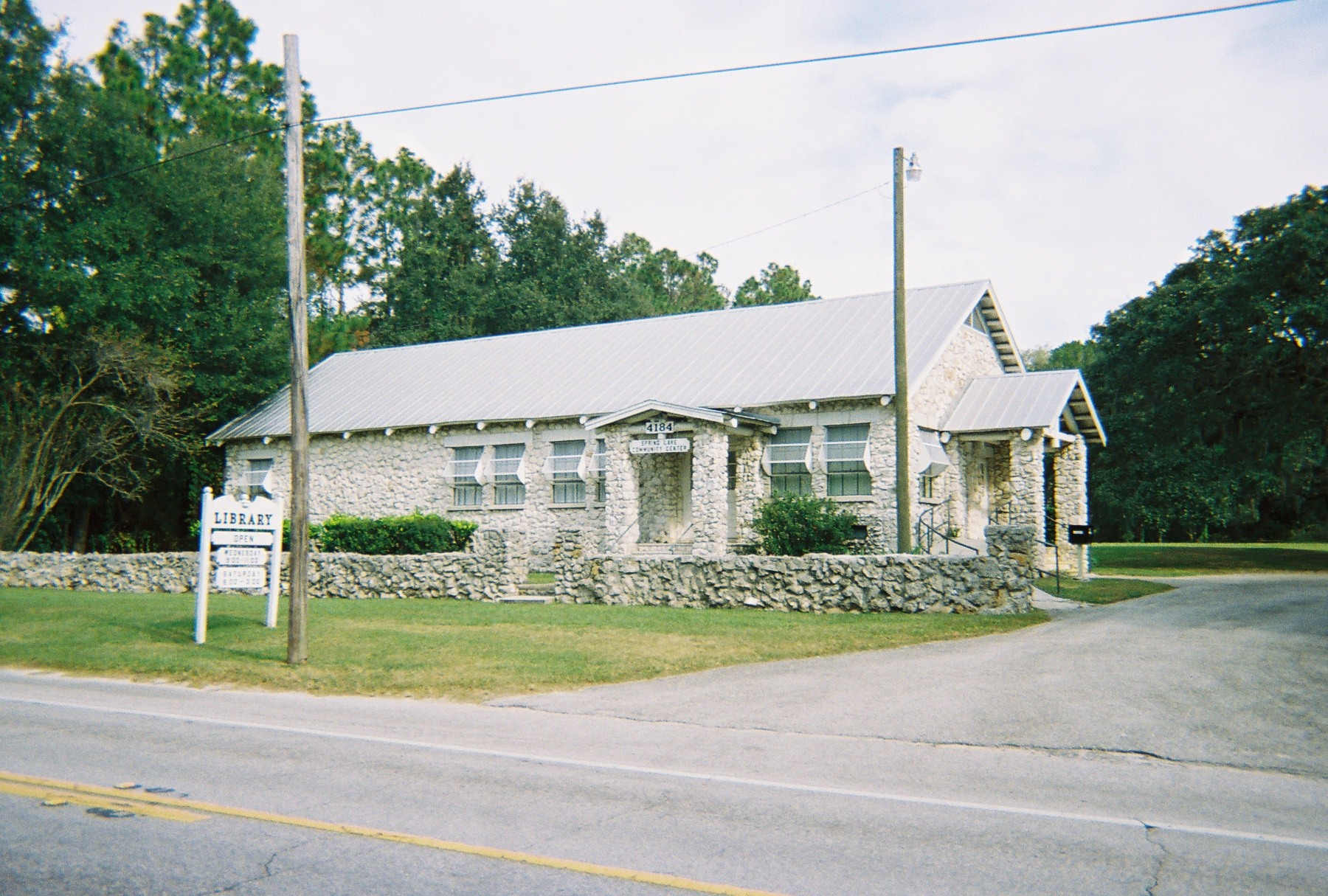

- Location within Florida Location within the United States
- Location: Spring Lake, Florida
- Coordinates: 28°29′33″N 82°18′10″W
- NRHP reference No.: 09000843
- Added to NRHP: October 20, 2009

Spring Lake Community Center is a national historic site located at 4184 Spring Lake Highway, Spring Lake, Florida in Hernando County.

It was added to the National Register of Historic Places on October 20, 2009.
