= Halifax River =

River in Florida, United States

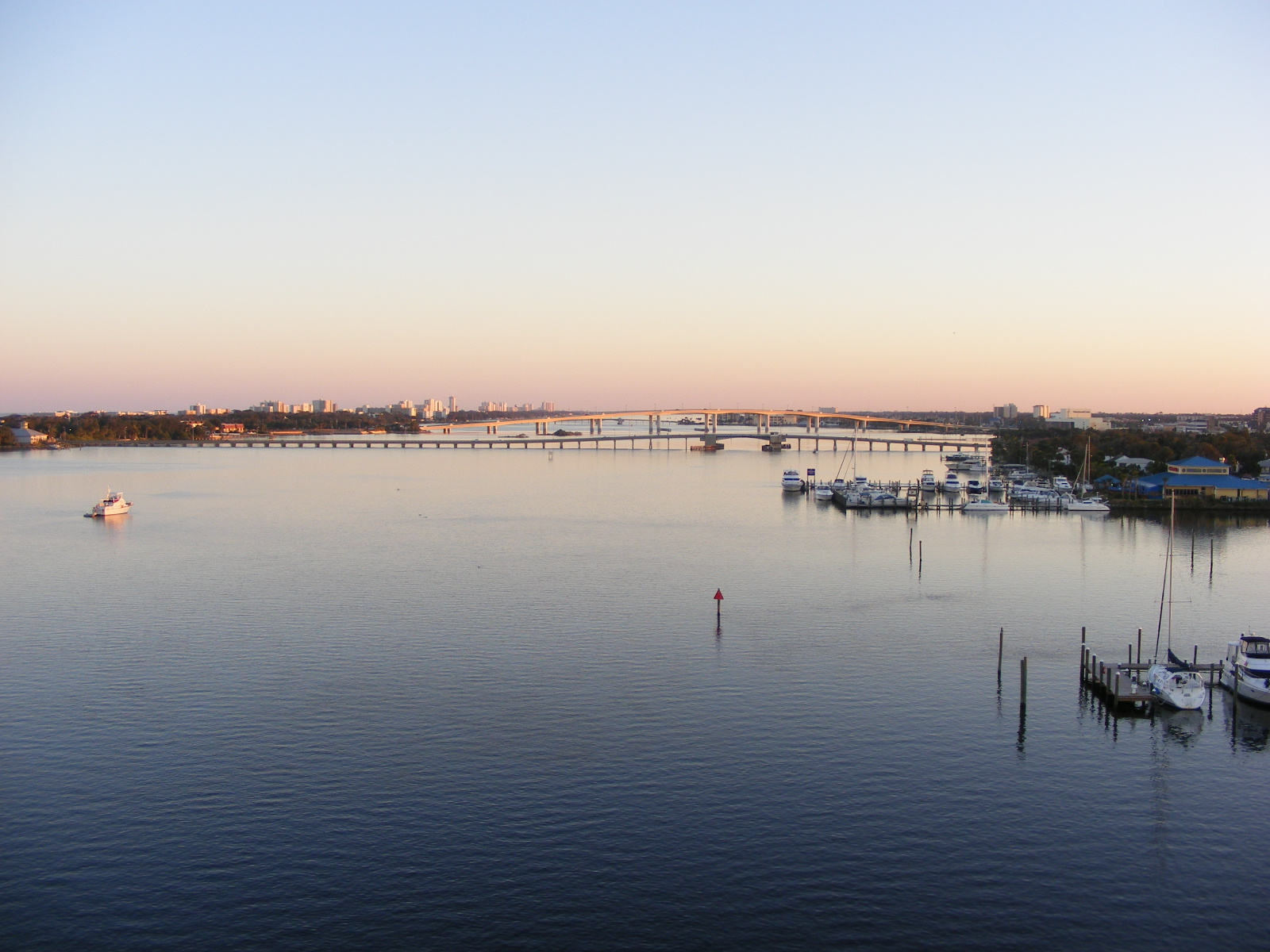
- A view of the Halifax River southbound from the Seabreeze Bridge, Daytona Beach, Volusia County, Florida. Three other bridges can be seen from this vista: Main Street Bridge (closest), Broadway Bridge, and Veterans Memorial Bridge. Two boat marinas can be seen to the right.

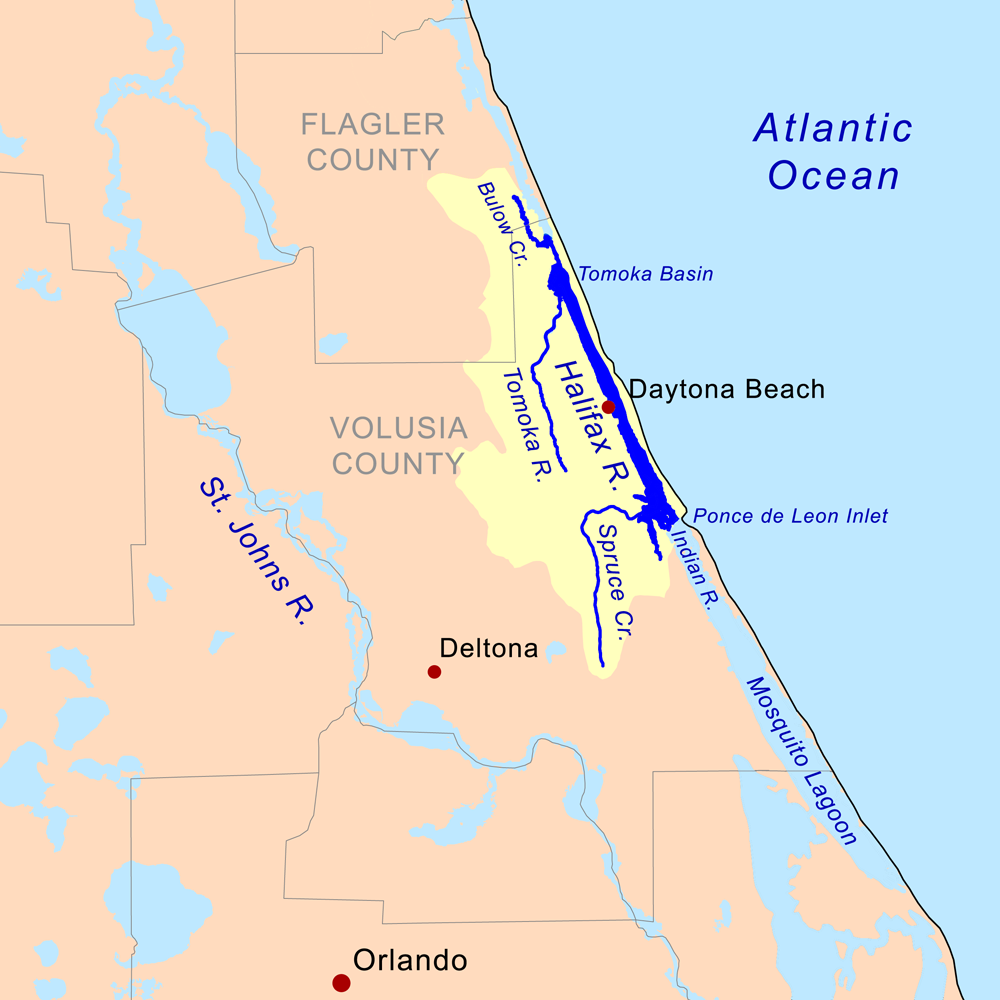
- Halifax River Drainage Basin
- Etymology: George Montagu-Dunk, 2nd Earl of Halifax

Location
- Country: United States
- State: Florida
- Cities: Ormond Beach, FL, Holly Hill, FL, Daytona Beach, FL, South Daytona, FL, Port Orange, FL

Physical characteristics
- Source: Tomoka Basin
  - location: Tomoka State Park, Volusia County, FL
  - coordinates: 29°21′40″N 81°05′30″W
  - elevation: 5 ft (1.5 m)
- Mouth: Atlantic Ocean
  - location: Ponce Inlet, Volusia County, FL
  - coordinates: 29°04′25″N 80°55′22″W
  - elevation: 0 ft (0 m)
- Length: 25 mi (40 km)
- Basin size: 1,009 sq mi (2,610 km^{2})
- Discharge
  - location: Ponce Inlet, FL

Basin features
- Tributaries
  - left: Halifax Creek
  - right: Tomoka River, Spruce Creek

The Halifax River is part of the Atlantic Intracoastal Waterway, located in northeast Volusia County, Florida. The waterway was originally known as the North Mosquito River, but was renamed after George Montagu-Dunk, 2nd Earl of Halifax (for whom Halifax, Nova Scotia, Canada is also named), during the British occupation of Florida (1763–1784).

== Geography ==
The Halifax River originates at Tomoka Bay, at the confluence of the Tomoka River, Bulow Creek, and Halifax Creek, adjoining Tomoka State Park. The Halifax River's drainage basin (or catchment) includes most of eastern Volusia County, which includes the flow from the Tomoka River and Halifax Creek. The total area covered is 1008.3 km². Water flows south for a distance of 25 miles (40 km). The Halifax River merges with Spruce Creek and the Mosquito Lagoon just before it connects to the Atlantic Ocean via the Ponce de Leon Inlet.

The Halifax River runs through the cities of Ormond Beach, and Daytona Beach. It also runs next to the Jackie Robinson Ballpark on City Island and the Ponce de Leon Inlet Lighthouse. The Halifax Harbor Marina is located on the waterway as well.

=== Cities along the river ===
The Halifax River runs through two cities, and past four cities and one town, and was used to define portions of these cities' borders. The middle of the riverbed at the time the borders were established was the line to define the borders between cities. The cities below have either historic significance or cultural lore connecting them to the Halifax River. They are ordered from the beginning of the river to its end.

- Ormond Beach, Florida - Named after James Ormond, an early settler who arrived in 1807 and took a Spanish land grant. The area was chosen in 1873 by the Corbin Lock Company of New Britain, Connecticut, as a winter haven for their employees. Most of the early settlers were also from Connecticut. The Town of Ormond-By-The-Halifax was incorporated on April 22, 1880.
- Holly Hill, Florida - Located entirely on the mainland north of Daytona Beach, the area was originally settled in 1876. Incorporated on July 1, 1901, the city was named by its founder, William Samuel Fleming Sr., because of its similarity to his Irish Hollywood home.
- Daytona Beach, Florida - Named after Mathias Day of Mansfield, Ohio, who bought land on the Halifax River in 1870, and developed the land into a settlement. Many of the early settlers were also from Ohio. The town of Daytona was incorporated in 1876. 50 years later, in 1926, the separate towns of Daytona, Daytona Beach, Kingston and Seabreeze merged into the present City of Daytona Beach.
- South Daytona, Florida - Originally known as Blake, located entirely on the mainland south of Daytona Beach, this community was settled circa 1886 and was granted a Post Office in 1887. Blake remained unincorporated until 1926, when the new consolidated Daytona Beach annexed it. The residents decided to fight annexation in the courts, until they were able to form their own city in 1938. The small community incorporated as the City of South Daytona, thus becoming another namesake of Mathias Day.
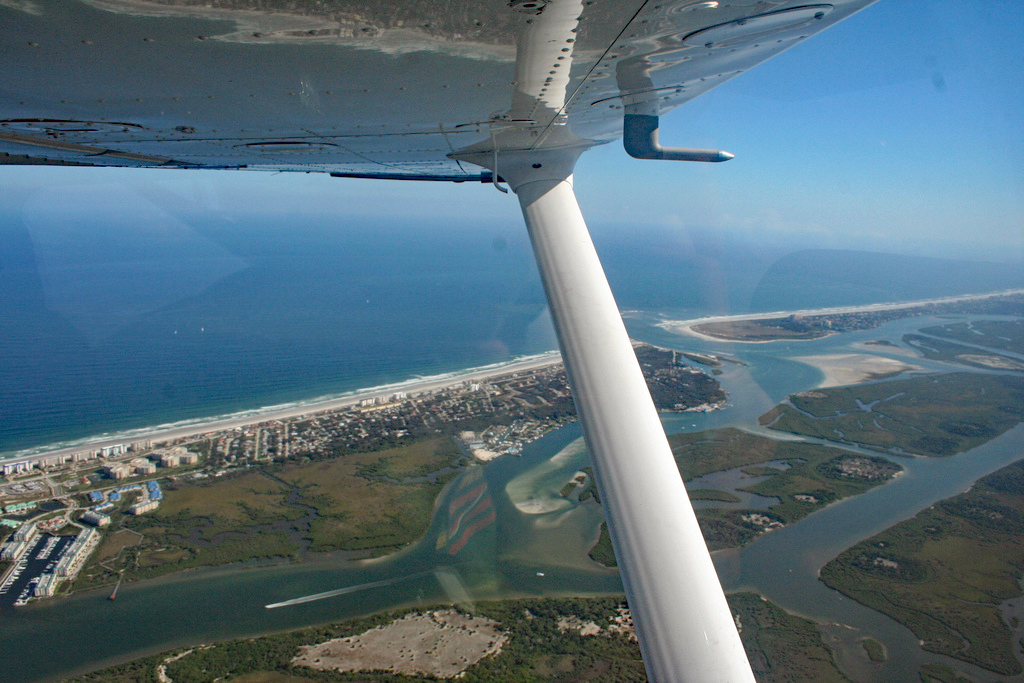
  Aerial view of the south part of Halifax River, at Ponce Inlet
- Daytona Beach Shores, Florida - This relatively new, small community is located entirely on the beach peninsula, south of Daytona Beach. The community was formed in 1960 by a group of moteliers who called themselves 2,000 Cottages. The City incorporated in 1967 as Daytona Beach Shores, becoming another namesake of Mathias Day. Commonly called "The Shores" by local residents to avoid confusion.
- Port Orange, Florida
- Ponce Inlet, Florida

=== Bridges ===
There are currently six bridges along the river, including one bascule bridge. They are ordered from north to south.

- Granada Bridge (SR 40) - The first bridge to cross the Halifax River opened here in 1887, connecting two parts of Ormond Beach, Florida, mainland to the beach peninsula. A later bridge, the Rockefeller Memorial Bridge, a bascule bridge, opened on March 2, 1954. This was replaced by the present high clearance bridge in 1983.
- Seabreeze Bridge (SR 430) - The first Seabreeze Bridge was built in 1902, connecting what was then known as Ocean Blvd. in Seabreeze (now Seabreeze Blvd) to Mason Ave. in Daytona on the mainland. The original bridge was funded and constructed by the Post family who settled the town of Seabreeze. In 1926, Seabreeze was incorporated into Daytona Beach, and the bridge was then sold to the bridge authority. In 1942, it was found to be in disrepair vehicular traffic was no longer permitted, only regulated pedestrian usage. It was determined that the water opening was the smallest on the Eastern seaboard as well, so plans came to replace it. A two-lane bascule bridge was opened in 1950 to replace the older bridge. A pair of high clearance bridges were built to replace the drawbridge in 1997. The westbound bridge connects with Seabreeze Blvd., and the eastbound span connects with Oakridge Blvd.
- Main Street Bridge (CR 4040) - The first bridge at this location was opened in 1888. The bridge connected Fairview Avenue from mainland Daytona to Seabreeze Avenue (named Main Street today) in old Daytona Beach (two separate cities at the time). In 1959, a bascule bridge was constructed as a replacement.
- Broadway Bridge (US 92) - The first span at this location was built in 1912. In 1947, the Broadway Bascule Bridge was built, connecting Volusia Avenue (now ISB) on the Mainland to Broadway Avenue on the beach peninsula. In 2001, a new high-span Broadway Bridge was dedicated to replace the old drawbridge. The new bridge is more famous for its flair than its purpose; Mosaics of manatees, dolphins and other wildlife native to Florida give the bridge some tourist appeal.
- Veterans Memorial Bridge (CR 4050) - The "South Bridge" from old Daytona near City Island to old Daytona Beach on the peninsula was built in 1899 with assistance from Henry M. Flagler. The bridge connected Orange Avenue from the Mainland to Silver Beach Avenue on the Peninsula. A replacement bascule bridge was constructed in 1954, and was renamed the Veterans Memorial Bridge in 1959. The bridge was closed in June, 2016 for destruction and replacement with a tall span bridge.
- Port Orange Causeway (SR A1A) - Commonly called the Port Orange Bridge or the Dunlawton Avenue Bridge, this bridge connects the mainland city of Port Orange, Florida with the beach peninsula. The first one at this location was built in 1906, made of sable palm pilings and pine bridge timbers; The bridge was washed away by a hurricane in 1932. A wooden toll bascule bridge was built here in 1951. The drawbridge was replaced in 1990 by a new high bridge which presently spans the river. The Florida State Legislature designated the new bridge as the Congressman William V. Chappell Jr. Memorial Bridge.

== History ==
=== Native Americans ===
The area of the Halifax River was first settled about 7,000 years ago, by Native American tribes who were the ancestors of tribes such as the Timucua Indians. The natives lived on fish and oysters, leaving shell mounds on both sides of the Halifax River. Most of the shell mounds were used by later settlers to build roads, but a few remain in the area, preserved as historical sites, such as Green Mound, Nocoroco, Ormond Mound, and Spruce Creek Mound Complex. The natives were likely part of the St. Johns culture.

=== European exploration ===
==== First Spanish occupation 1513-1763 ====
After Juan Ponce de León claimed Florida in April 1513, and Pedro Menéndez de Avilés established St. Augustine in 1565, the Spanish continued to explore the region. In 1569 Captain Antonio de Prado first explored the area around Ponce de Leon Inlet (which he named los Mosquitos, due to the large number of gnats that inhabited the area), and mentioned Nocoroco in his report to the King of Spain, noting that the village was located between two rivers (now known as Tomoka and Halifax). In 1605, Spanish explorer Alvaro Mexia visited and mapped the Halifax River area (named North Mosquito River on his map), noting the native villages of Nocoroco, Cacaroy, Cicale, and Caparaca in his report.

The Spanish brought in Franciscan friars and established Catholic Missions in Florida, in an attempt to convert the natives to Christianity. At their peak, there were 44 such Spanish missions in Florida, and some of them may have been in the Halifax River area. The Spanish also recruited the natives to grow food on primitive farms. However, epidemics of yellow fever in 1649, smallpox in 1650, and measles in 1659 decimated both the Indian and Spanish population in Florida. Several Indian revolts also decimated the population further. By the time Spain ceded Florida to the British in 1763, they had little progress to show for their efforts in the colony and Florida was left as a "hollow shell", practically devoid of population when the Spanish evacuated.

==== British occupation 1763-1783 ====
Spain ceded Florida to the British in 1763, in exchange for Cuba, at the end of the Seven Years' War/French and Indian War. Britain then divided the territory into East Florida and West Florida, and gave out many land grants to encourage settlers. During the survey of these land grants, the Halifax River received its name in honor of Lord Halifax, who was the British President of the Board of Trade. The British Council of East Florida made 576 grants on family right totaling more than 210,000 acres (850 km^{2}), and 114 grants, totaling 1,443,000 acres (5,840 km^{2}), by the approval of the King. After the American Revolution began, Florida became the destination for loyalists from the southern colonies, who were offered land free of taxes or levies for ten years. Colonists that settled in the Halifax River area named their colony Halifax City, which was located near present-day Allandale in Port Orange.

It was during the British occupation when Dr. Andrew Turnbull created the notorious New Smyrna colony, just to the south of the Halifax River, in 1768. The New Smyrna colonists complained about mistreatment during their indentured servitude, and the British Governor in St. Augustine eventually allowed them to leave.

==== Second Spanish occupation 1783-1821 ====
The Spanish joined with the French on the Colonial side, against the British during the American Revolution. After the British loss, they surrendered Florida to Spain in exchange for the Bahamas in the Treaty of Paris (1783). According to the terms of the treaty, the British were obligated to evacuate their colonial subjects; however, Spain allowed any colonists to stay, provided they agreed to swear allegiance to the Spanish Kingdom and convert to Catholicism.

During this occupation period, the Spanish made three large land grants in the Halifax River area, one of which went to James Ormond, a Scottish sea captain, namesake of Ormond Beach, Florida. Ormond transported Franciscan friars to Florida for the Spanish, who gave him the 2,000-acre (8.1 km^{2}) grant in 1807 as compensation. Two other Spanish land grants (roughly encompassing Daytona Beach and Port Orange) went to absentee landlords, and the areas remained undeveloped.

== Recreation ==
=== Boating ===
Boating is a popular activity, and there are several marinas and yacht clubs located throughout the Halifax River. The Halifax River Yacht Club was founded in 1896.

=== Fishing ===
Fishing is another popular activity in the Halifax River. Fishing is allowed from boats, the banks of the river, or from any of the bridges crossing the waterway. Some of the species that can be found include: trout, catfish, flounder, sheepshead, tarpon, snook, black drum, mangrove snapper and red drum.

=== Wildlife Viewing ===
The Halifax river supports a diverse community of waterfowl, wading birds, fish, and other wildlife. The river and several of its tributaries (Tomoka River, Strickland, Thomson and Dodson Creek) are designated as a Manatee Sanctuary. Other rare species that inhabit the river basin include the wood stork, bald eagle, and Atlantic salt marsh snake. Numerous other birds can be viewed in the general area of the Halifax River Basin.

The Halifax River Trail forms part of the East Coast Greenway, a system of trails connecting Maine to Florida.

== Navigation history ==
=== Intracoastal Waterway ===
Prior to 1913, navigation channels and canals in Florida were maintained chiefly by private enterprise. In 1882 the Florida East Coast Line Canal and Transportation Co. was organized to develop a waterway from Jacksonville to Biscayne Bay by connecting with canals the St Johns, Matanzas, and Halifax rivers, Mosquito Lagoon, Indian river, Lake Worth, Hillsboro river, New river, and Snake Creek; in 1908 this vast undertaking was completed.

The Rivers and Harbors Act of 1927, passed by Congress, authorized the Atlantic Intracoastal Waterway, using the route planned out by the Jacksonville District of the U.S. Army Corps Of Engineers. The Waterway was valuable during World War II, after German submarines sank numerous merchant ships off the East Coast. The Corps continues to maintain the navigation channel today, conducting dredgings as needed.

== Wildlife Gallery ==
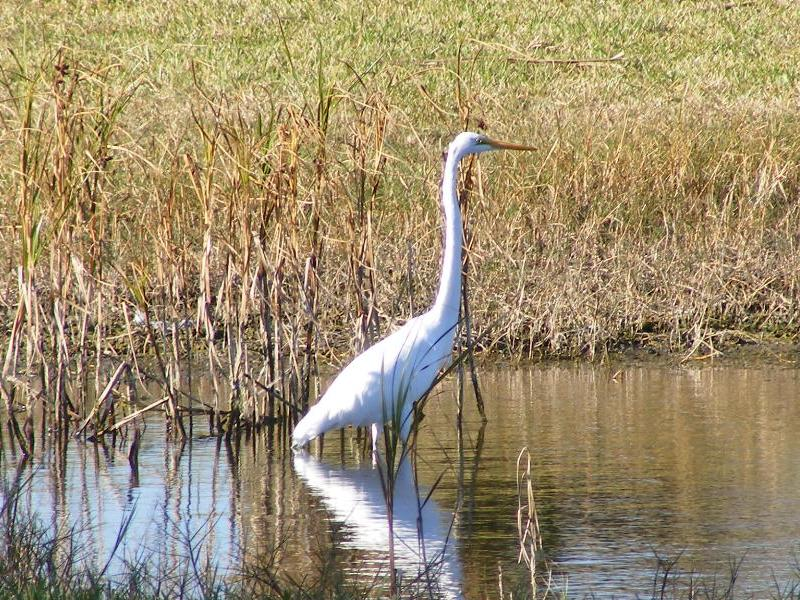
A Great Egret wades near the west bank of the Halifax River.

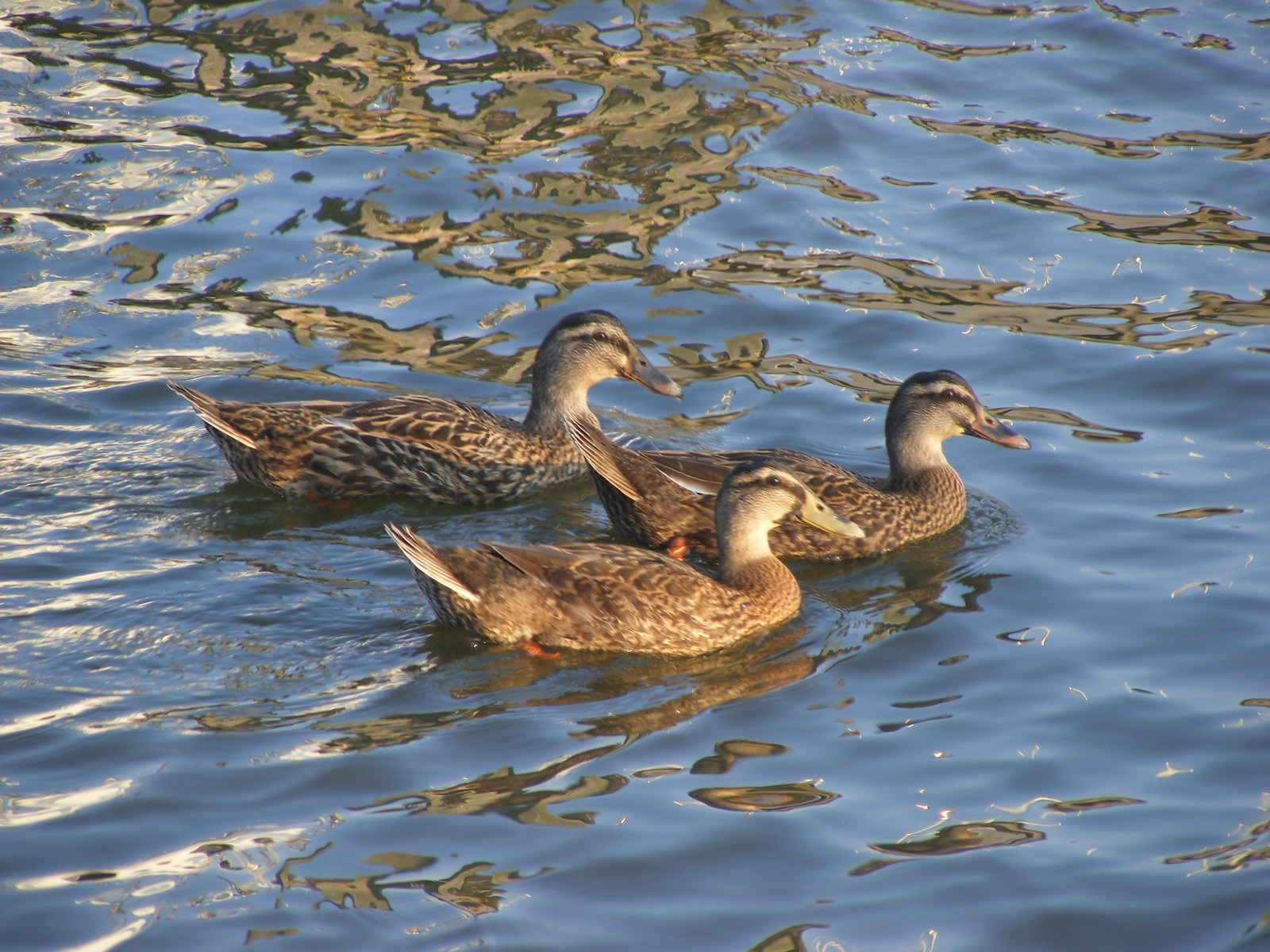
Mallard Ducks swim in the Halifax River near Daytona Beach.

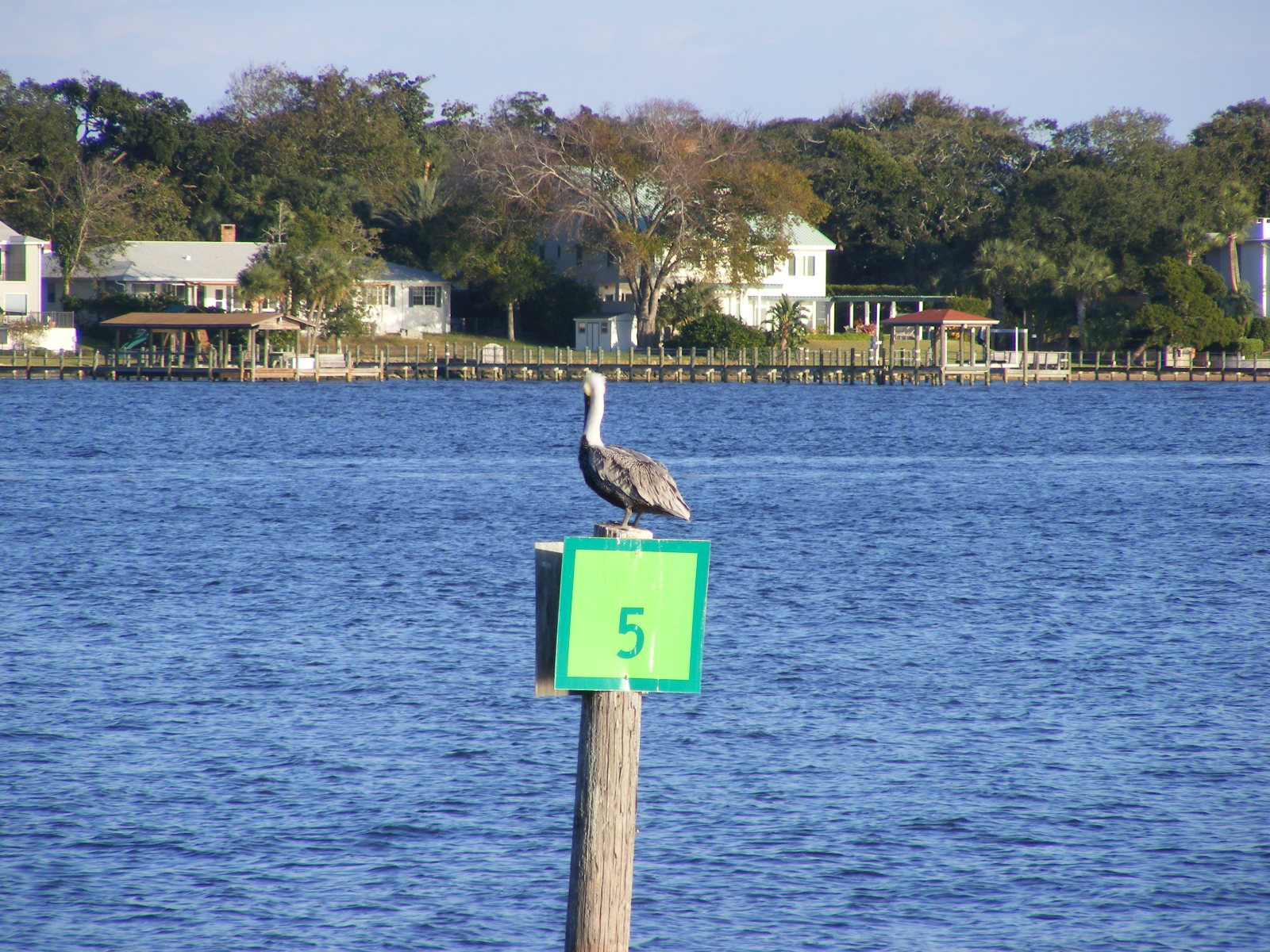
A Brown Pelican rests on a navigation marker near Ormond Beach.

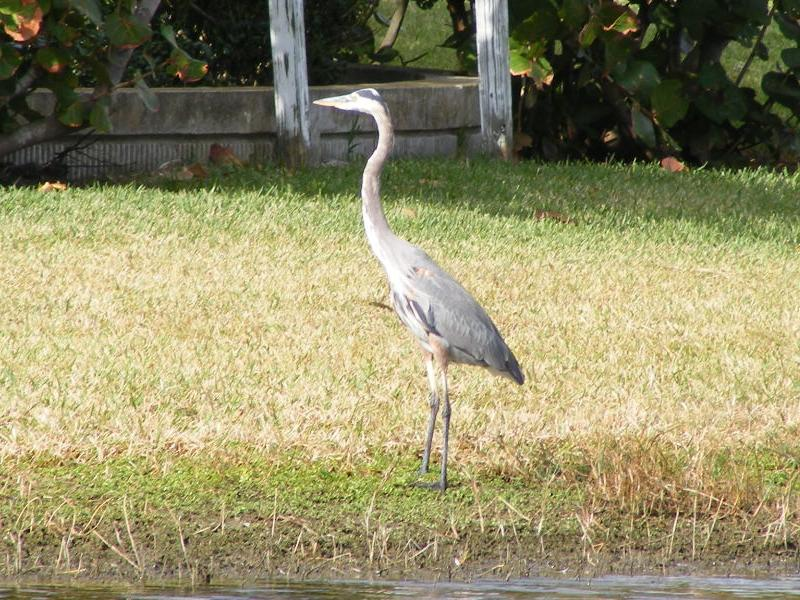
A Great Blue Heron near the west bank of the Halifax River.

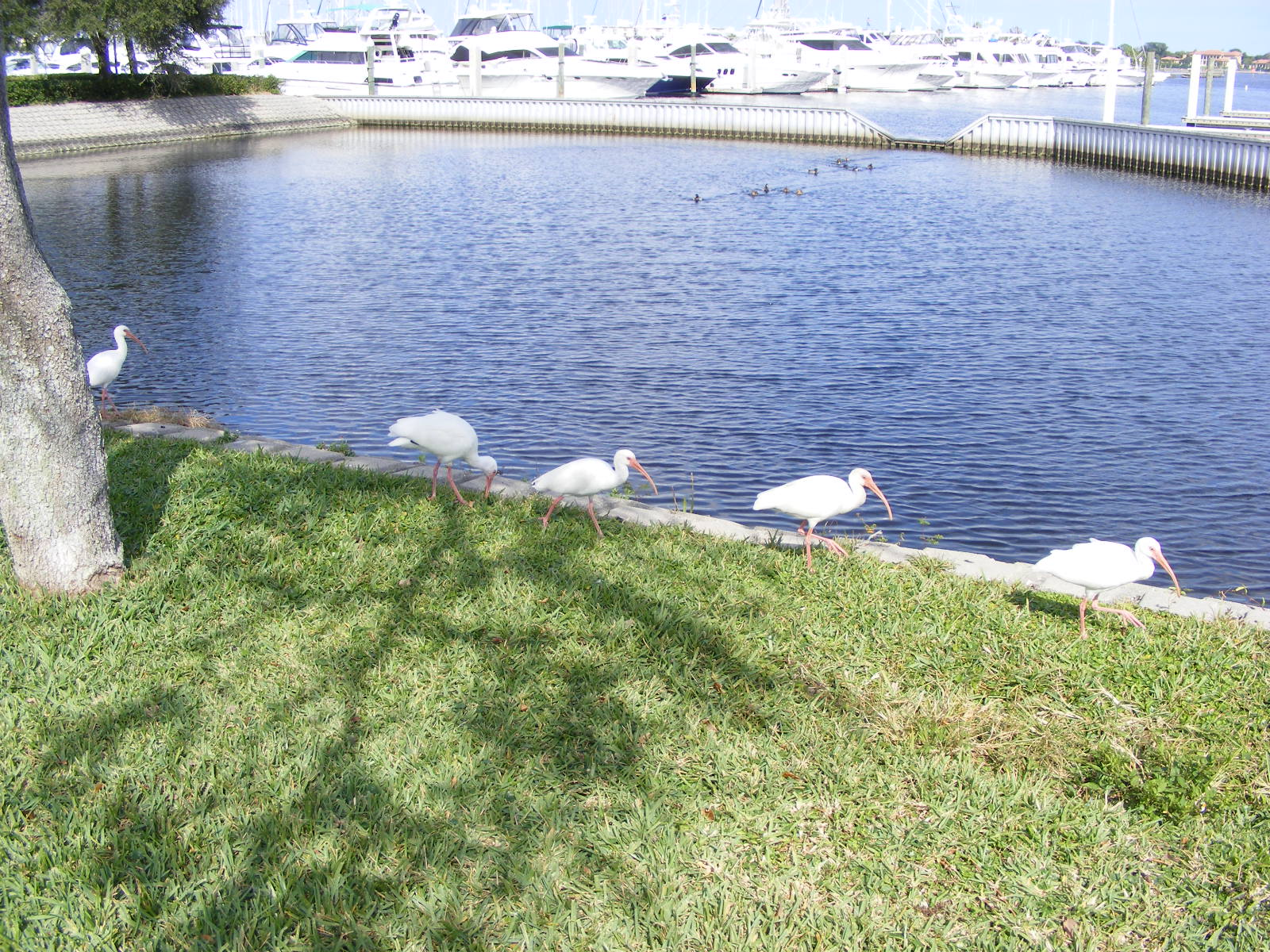
American White Ibis' hunt for food on the bank of the Halifax River.

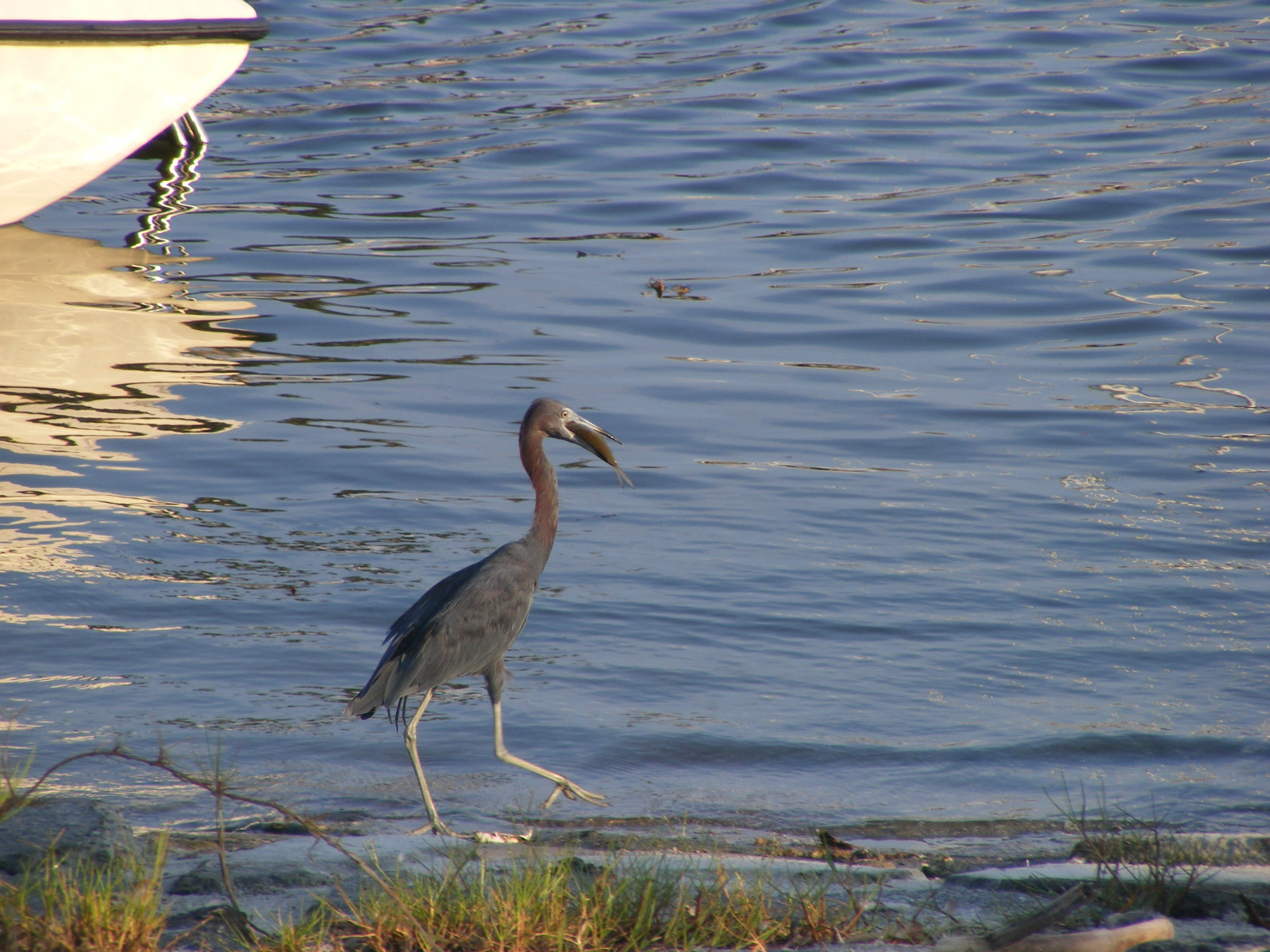
A hungry Little Blue Heron feasts on a fish in the Halifax River.

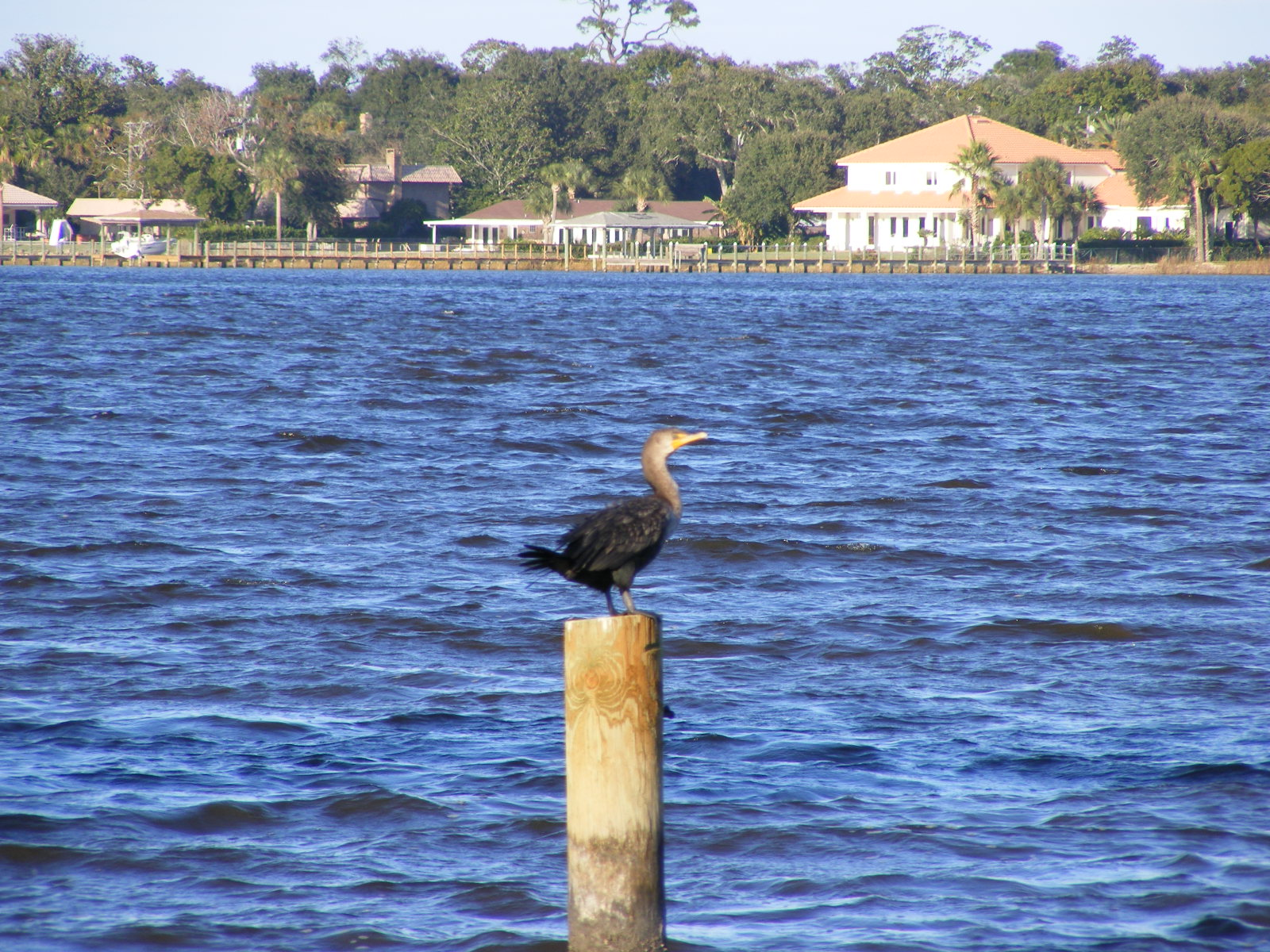
A Double Crested Cormorant rests on an abandoned piling.

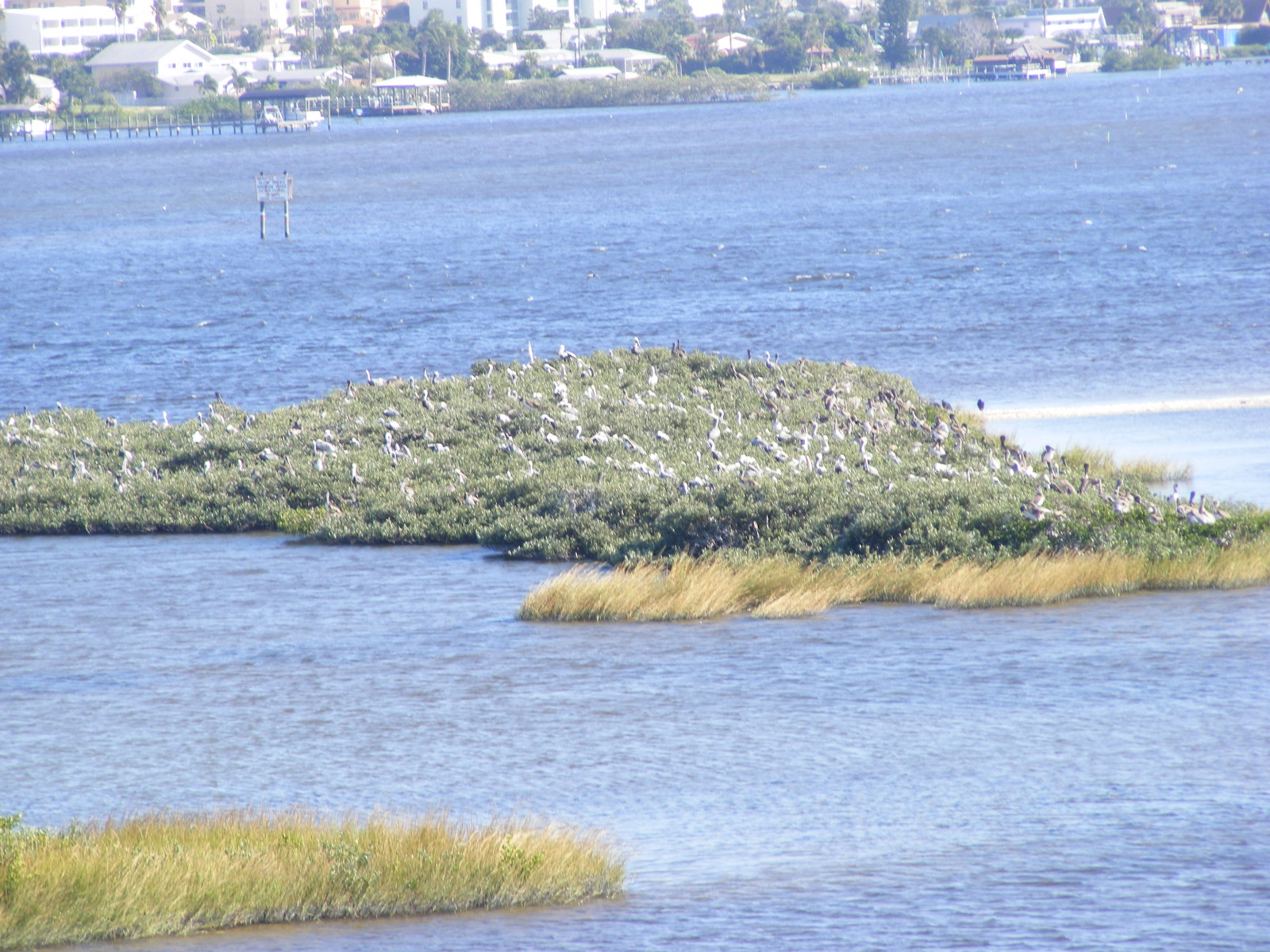
Birds gather at the Port Orange Wildlife Sanctuary.

== See also ==
- List of Florida rivers
- List of crossings of the Halifax River
