= John W. Griffin (archaeologist) =

- Born: November 8, 1919; Connersville, Indiana
- Died: September 3, 1993 (aged 73); St. Augustine, Florida
- Education: University of Florida
- Known for: Being an Archaeologist
- Spouse: Patricia Griffin

John Wallace Griffin (November 8, 1919, in Connersville, Indiana – September 3, 1993) was the State Archaeologist of Florida, the Director of the St. Augustine Historical Society, and a Regional Archaeologist for the National Park Service.

== Background ==
Griffin was born in Connersville, Indiana, and grew up with his family in Daytona Beach, Florida. He graduated from the University of Florida and later went to the University of Chicago. In 1946, he became the first archaeologist to be employed by the State of Florida. Five years later, he collaborated with Mark Boyd and Hale Smith to write Here They Once Stood, which is his best known work. From 1958 to 1971, Griffin was the Director of the St. Augustine Historical Society as well as the regional archaeologist for the National Park Service. He formed his own archaeological and historical consulting firm, Southeastern Frontiers Inc. in 1977. John Griffin died September 3, 1993, at the age of 73 from cancer.

== Education ==
Griffin attended Seabreeze High School in Daytona Beach, Florida. There, in his history class, his group was assigned a project on the French and Spanish conflict at the time of the first settlement in Florida. This topic would become a lifelong interest of Griffin's. He later went on to graduate from the University of Florida with an undergraduate degree in archaeology (at the time, no anthropology courses were offered at the school). Griffin spent a summer at the University of Denver, where he focused on southwestern archaeology and the direct historical approach. He arrived at the University of Chicago in 1939 to pursue his master's degree. His master's thesis, finished in 1946, was entitled "The Upper Mississippi Occupation at the Fisher Site, Will County, Illinois."

== First projects for Florida Park Services ==
After being hired as state archaeologist by the Florida Park Service, Griffin recruited his friend from the University of Chicago, Hale Smith, to assist him in conducting a statewide survey of prehistoric and historical sites. On a Spanish map of 1605 the point of land that is now Tomoka State Park was clearly drawn and the location of the Timucuan Village of Nocoroco had been labeled. Together they tried to identify what the Timucuan material culture was as of 1605 using the direct historic method. Next, there was the excavation of Goodnow Mound which occurred in 1946. The main purpose of this dig was to gather information on a “contact period burial mound” because burial mound construction was thought to have apparently largely ceased in the eastern United States by the time of contact.

The excavations conducted by Hale Smith on the Scott Miller site provided Griffin with the first “empirical information” about a Spanish mission site in Florida. A year later, Griffin worked on a test excavation at San Luis de Talimali, which was the seat of the deputy governor of the Province of Apalachee. In the summer of 1949, Griffin took a class entitled, "The Preservation and Interpretation of Historic Sites and Buildings" at American University. During this time, Congress instated the National Trust for Historic Preservation, which greatly motivated him to start planning a new system to understand the history of the state. Griffin also surveyed sites including the Bulow Sugar Mill, the Addison Blockhouse, the McHardy House and Mill, and Amelia Island.

== Work sites for National Park Services ==
From 1958 to 1971, during his employment with the National Park Service, Griffin worked on many well-known historical sites such as: "the fence line at Appomattox, a ground-level study at Manassas, an outbuilding at Yorktown, the boyhood cabin site of Booker T. Washington, and the Cubo defense line at Castillo de San Marcos in St. Augustine". He also discovered Osceola's skeleton at Ft. Moultrie, South Carolina. But his largest field work projects were: Russell Cave, Alabama, Everglades National Park, and the "Big Dig" at Ocmulgee National Monument.

== Legacy ==
Griffin is “best known for having made important contributions to the foundations and development of historical archaeology”. In 1958, the American Anthropological Association held a symposium to look at the role of archaeology in historical research. Griffin's paper, “End Products of Historic Sites Archaeology”, made the argument that “archaeology was merely a body of methods and techniques for the recovery of information, and that the archaeologist often served as a technician in projects designed by persons from other disciplines”. This “open-minded and broadly anthropological perspective on the past shaped the nature of archaeological research in Florida”. What he established in Florida when he was hired as the first professional archaeologist is still seen today in Florida archaeology. Also, there is The John W. Griffin Student Grant, which provides financial assistance to graduate students conducting research in Florida. This grant is offered annually by the Florida Archaeological Council.

== Honors and awards ==
In May 1992, Griffin received an honorary degree from the University of Florida “for sustained achievements of lasting significance and value”. In 1993 he received a posthumous Award of Merit from the Society for Historical Archaeology.

== Major works ==
In 1951, he wrote Here They Once Stood with Mark Boyd and Hale Smith. The book is about the end of the Apalachee Missions in the early 18th Century and also includes their research. The Archaeology of Everglades National Park: A Synthesis was published by the State of Florida in 1989. Right before his death in 1993, Griffin was approached with the idea of compiling his works and putting them in a book. It is made up of sixteen papers and the first chapter is an essay on how he became a historical archaeologist. Fifty Years of Southern Archaeology: Selected Works of John W. Griffin was published in 1996, three years after his death. Patricia Griffin, wife of John, was the editor. John Griffin also wrote over 125 articles.

== Family ==
John Griffin was married to Patricia Griffin for more than 50 years. They also worked together on many occasions. She was editor on his book, Fifty Years of Southeastern Archaeology: Selected Works of John W. Griffin. He had three daughters, Leta, Lona and Elizabeth; two sons, Douglas and Bruce; and ten grandchildren.

== Selected publications ==
The Antillean Problem in Florida Archaeology. Florida Historical Quarterly 22:86-91 (1943)

History and Archeology in Florida. Florida Historical Quarterly 23:184-90 (1945)

Here They Once Stood: The Tragic End of the Apalachee Missions (1951)

The Archaeology of Everglades National Park: A Synthesis (1989)

Fifty Years of Southeastern Archaeology: Selected Works of John W. Griffin (1996)
