= City Island =

City Island may refer to:

== Places ==
- City Island (Daytona Beach), Florida
- City Island, Bronx, New York
- City Island (Pennsylvania)
- City Island Bridge, connects City Island and Bronx, New York
- City Island Harbor, Bronx, New York
- Île de la Cité, island in Paris whose name translates to "City Island"
- London City Island, United Kingdom
- Chaplain Schmitt Island, often called City Island

== Other ==
- City Island (film), 2009 film by Raymond De Felitta set on City Island, New York
- City Island, an American animated short series on PBS Kids
