= Addison Blockhouse Historic State Park =

State park in Florida, United States

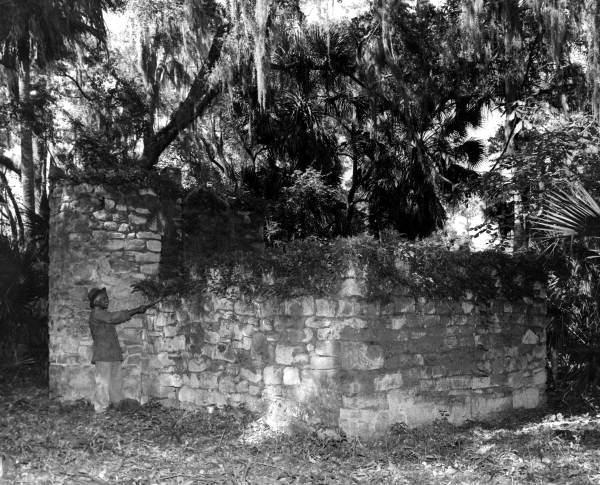
- Elderly man at Addison Blockhouse Historic State Park

- Location within Florida Location within the United States
- Interactive map of Addison Blockhouse Historic State Park
- Location: Volusia County, Florida, United States
- Nearest city: Ormond Beach, Florida
- Coordinates: 29°19′50″N 81°05′40″W
- Established: 1945
- Governing body: Florida Department of Environmental Protection

Addison Blockhouse Historic State Park is a state park located in Volusia County, Florida. It features the Addison Blockhouse, a small coquina rock ruin that was on a 19th-century plantation and served as a kitchen as well as a fort.

To preserve its cultural heritage, the site is not open to the public. The park is accessible by boat going across the Tomoka River.

== History ==
The Addison Blockhouse was built on a 19th-century plantation called Carrickfergus, established by John Moultrie. The blockhouse was originally an outside kitchen for Moultrie's overseer. Later the plantation was owned by John Addison, and then Duncan McRae. Addison named the plantation after his birthplace, Carrickfergus in Ireland. The plantation grew cotton and sugar from 1816 to 1836. During the Second Seminole War, the plantation was attacked on March 10, 1836. Two soldiers were killed and scalped at the site. The blockhouse was fortified by the Carolina Regiment of Volunteers to defend against the Seminoles, and became known as "Camp M'Rae". The plantation struggled financially and was later abandoned. The blockhouse was restored in the early 20th century, and has since been owned and maintained by Tomoka State Park.

== Description ==
The Addison Blockhouse is now a roofless ruin. It is about 11.5 ft (3.5 m) by 15 ft (4.6 m) in size. It contains a circular tower in one corner, 6 ft (1.8 m) in diameter and 11 ft (3.4 m) in height, as well as a large fireplace. It has six foot walls with an embankment and moat.

There is also an adjacent foundation and walls of a sugar mill from 1832 during the time McRae owned the plantation.

== See also ==
- List of Florida state parks
