= Spruce Creek Mound Complex =

Archaeological site in Florida, United States

- U.S. National Register of Historic Places
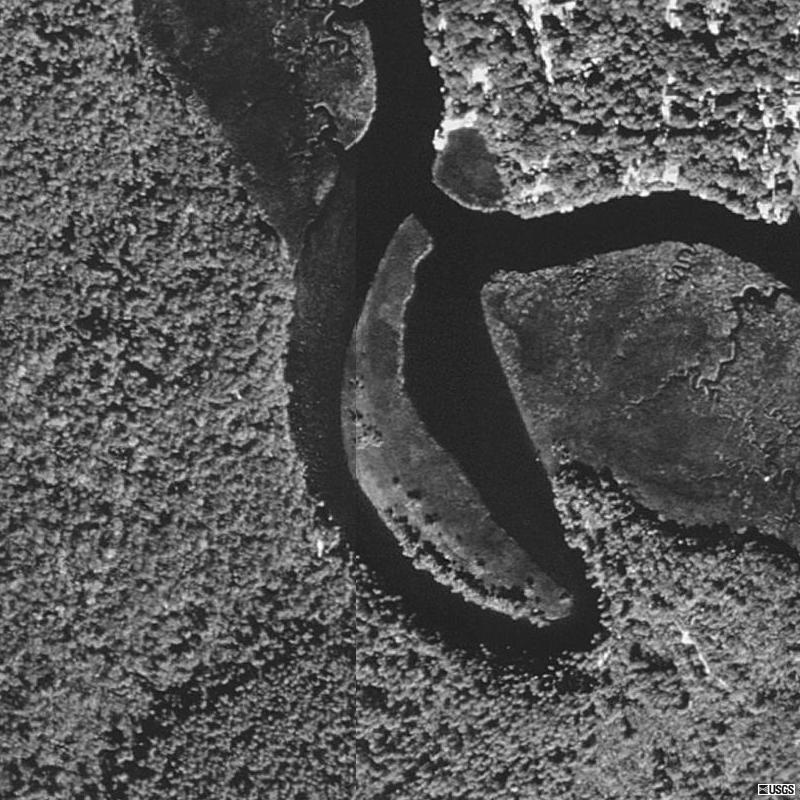
- Aerial view

- Location within Volusia County
- Location: Port Orange, Florida
- Coordinates: 29°4′23″N 80°59′51″W
- NRHP reference No.: 90001761
- Added to NRHP: December 3, 1990

The Spruce Creek Mound Complex is a prehistoric and early historic archeological site in Port Orange, Florida. The mound complex, major earthworks built out of earth and shell middens, was constructed by ancient indigenous peoples. It is located near Port Orange, on the southwest bank of Spruce Creek. On December 3, 1990, it was added to the U.S. National Register of Historic Places.

The Spruce Creek Mound, located on a bluff above the creek, was still tall enough during early colonial years to be used by travelers as a point of navigation. It was used as a ceremonial center and burial mound, and was believed to have been built from 500 to 1000 AD. The mound was added to over centuries, with layers of burials built upon each other.

At the time of European encounter, the site was used by Timucuan natives. They had harvested and eaten so much local shellfish, which comprised the bulk of their diet, that they left large shell middens. The site also has historic European artifacts from the early colonial period (1550-1700 AD). This suggests it was one of the villages visited by Spanish explorers, traders and/or colonists.
