= City Island (Daytona Beach) =

Island in the Halifax River in Florida, US

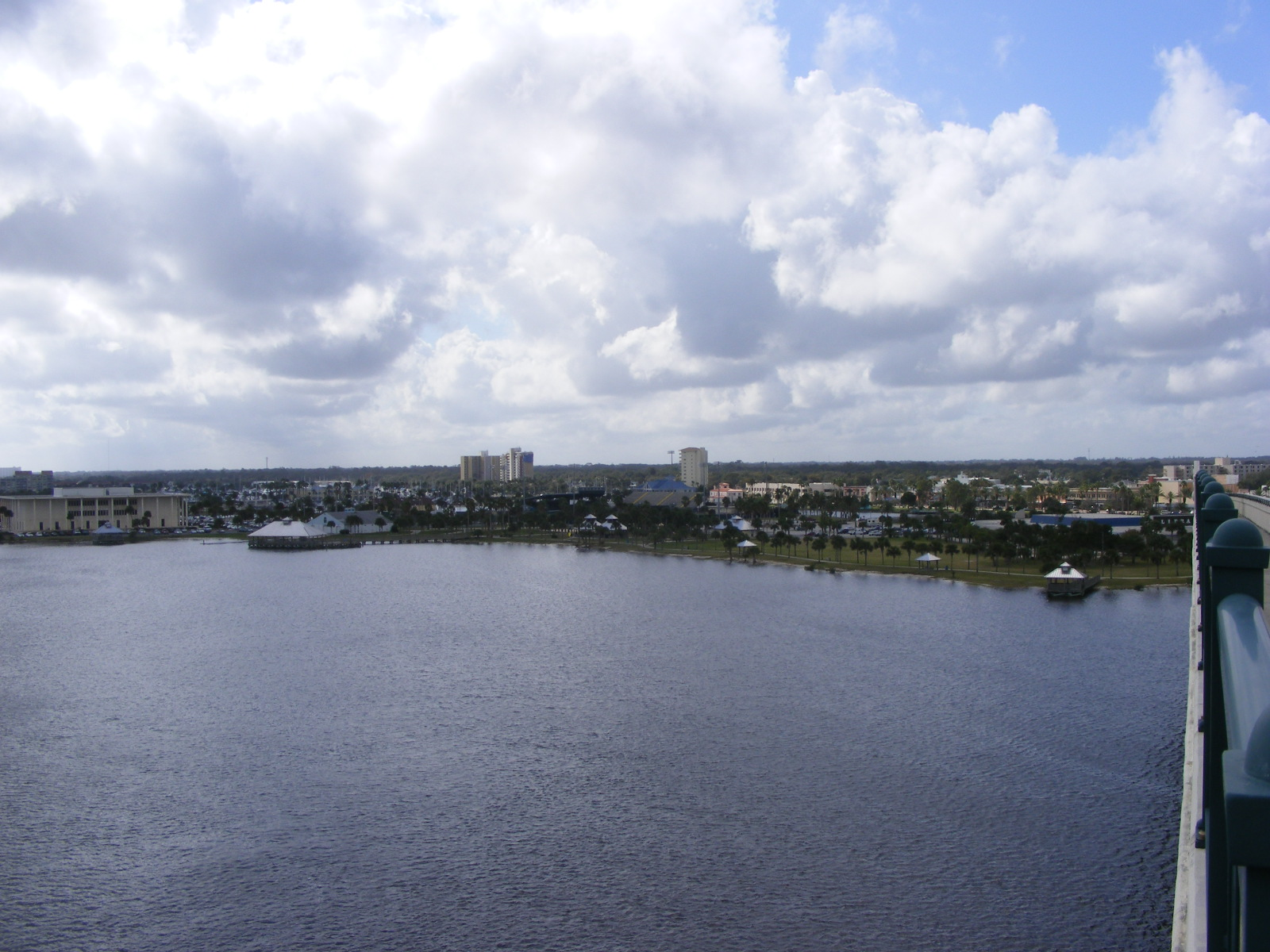

- Location within Volusia County

Geography
- Location: Halifax River
- Coordinates: 29.21058°N 81.01537°W

Administration
- United States
- State: Florida
- County: Volusia County
- City: Daytona Beach, Florida

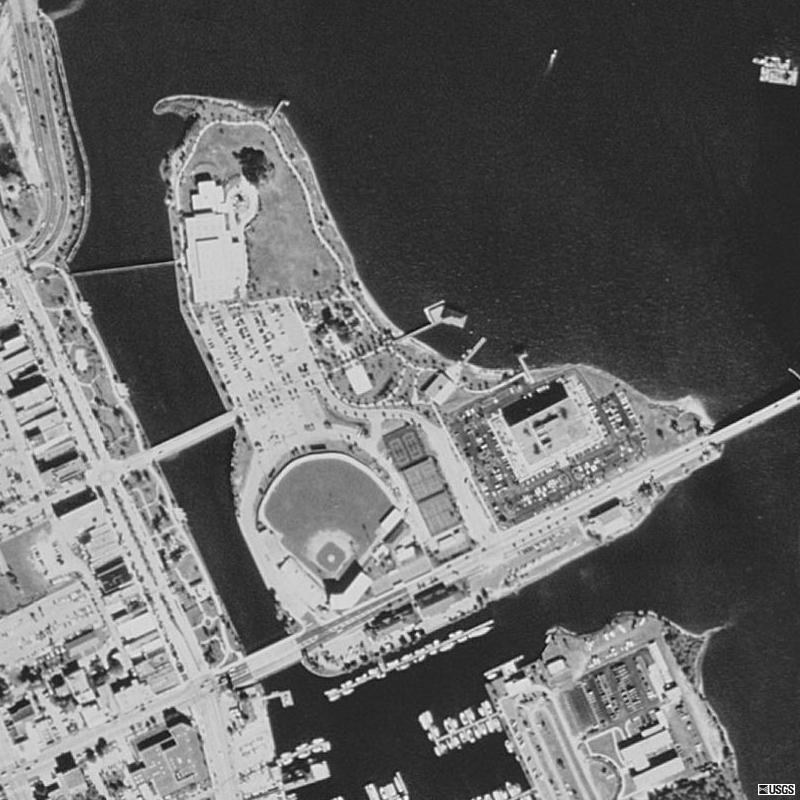
Aerial view of Daytona Beach City Island

City Island, Daytona Beach, Florida, United States, is an island in the Halifax River (a section of the Intracoastal Waterway) between mainland Florida and the barrier islands/outer banks. Buildings on the island include the Daytona Tortugas' Jackie Robinson Ballpark, the city's courthouse, and the main branch of the Volusia County Library.

== Geology ==
The bedrock of City Island is part of the Anastasia Formation of interbedded sands and coquinoid limestones (known as Coquina), created during the late Pleistocene Epoch. On top of the bedrock are layers of river sediments, built up and deposited by the Halifax River. Channel dredgings in the last 100 years were also deposited on City Island.

== Indigenous wildlife ==
City Island is an urbanized area, resembling any small Florida city. The animal life on the island are typical of such an environment: squirrels, rabbits, abundant green and brown anole lizards, occasional raccoons and skunk, as well as a large population of doves and pigeons.

The real diversity of wildlife on and around City Island are birds, especially aquatic species. There are many varieties of duck; mallards, clue-winged teal, and cormorants. American white ibis are common, as are brown pelicans, snowy egrets, great blue herons, great white egrets, and several types of gull. An occasional bald eagle or red-shouldered hawk can be seen overhead.

== Wildlife gallery ==
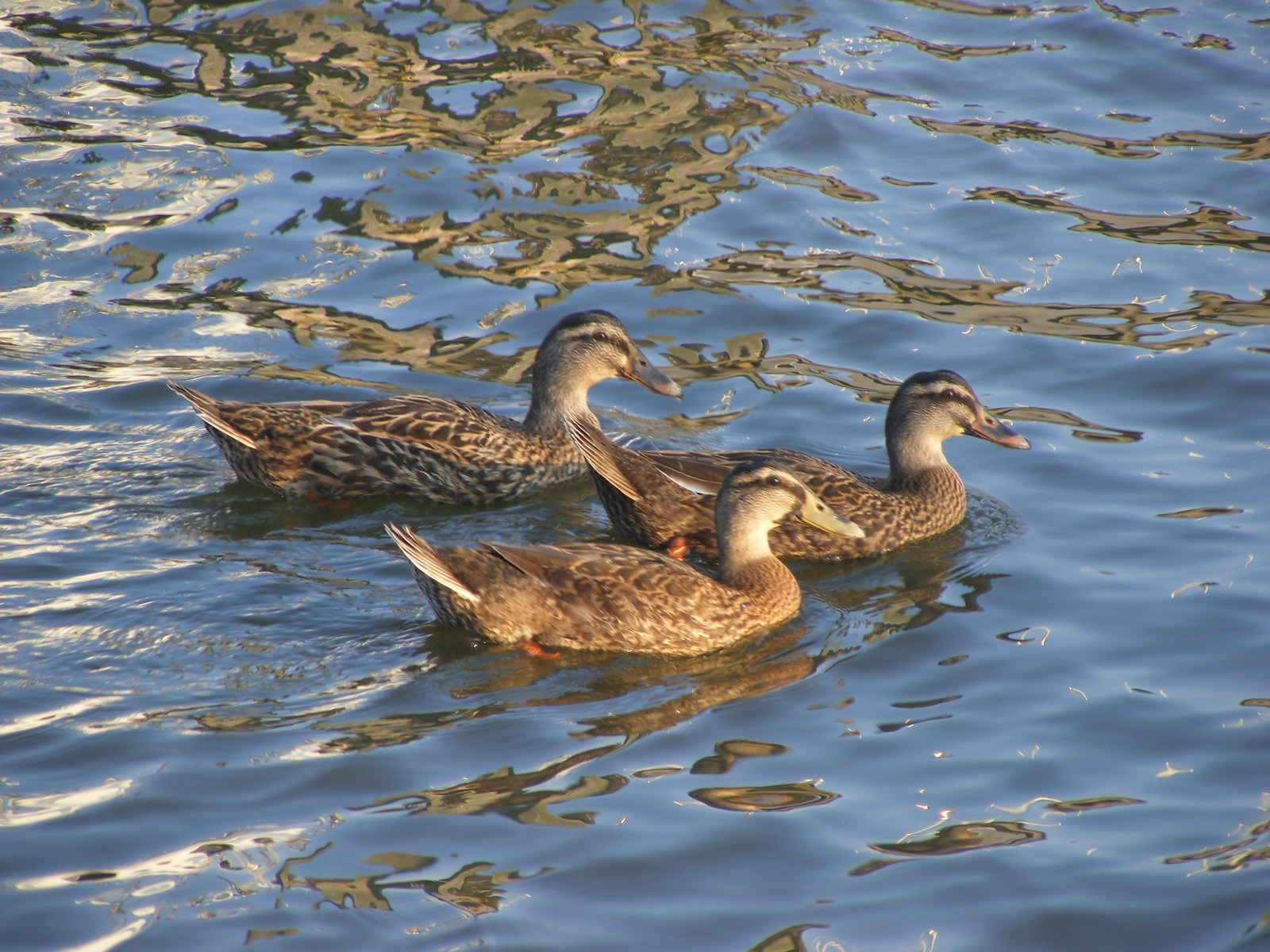
Mallard ducks swim in the Halifax River near City Island.

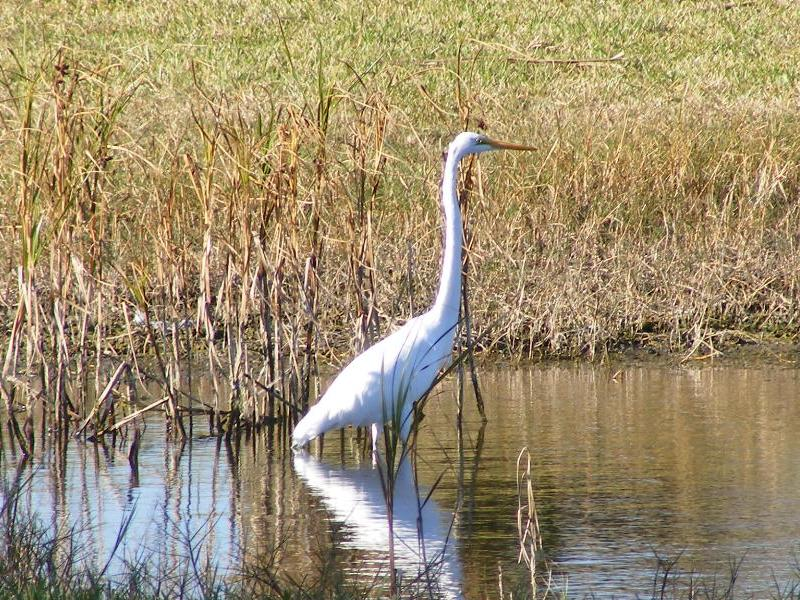
A great egret wades near City Island in the Halifax River.

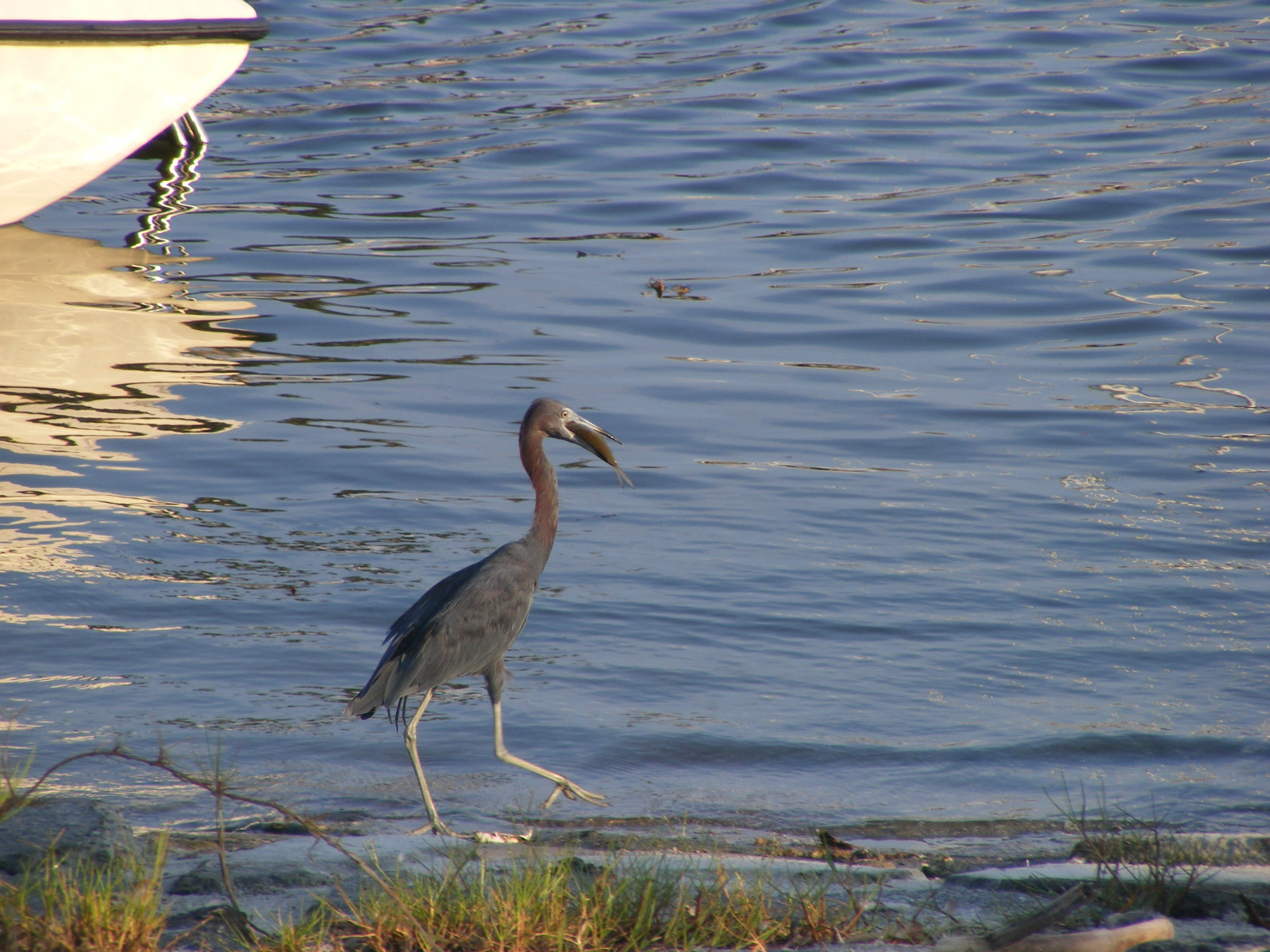
A hungry little blue heron feasts on a fish in the Halifax River.

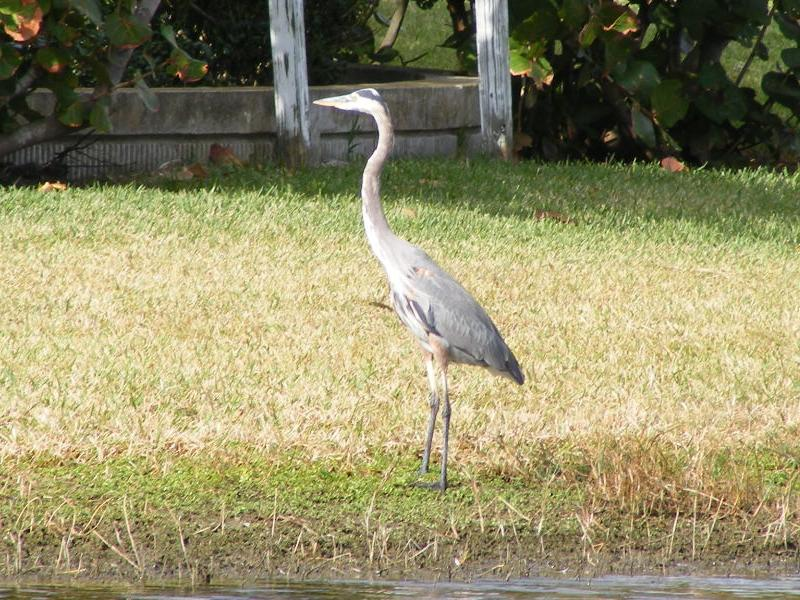
A great blue heron near City Island in the Halifax River.

== See also ==
- Halifax River
- Daytona Beach
