= Tomoka River =

River in Florida, United States of America

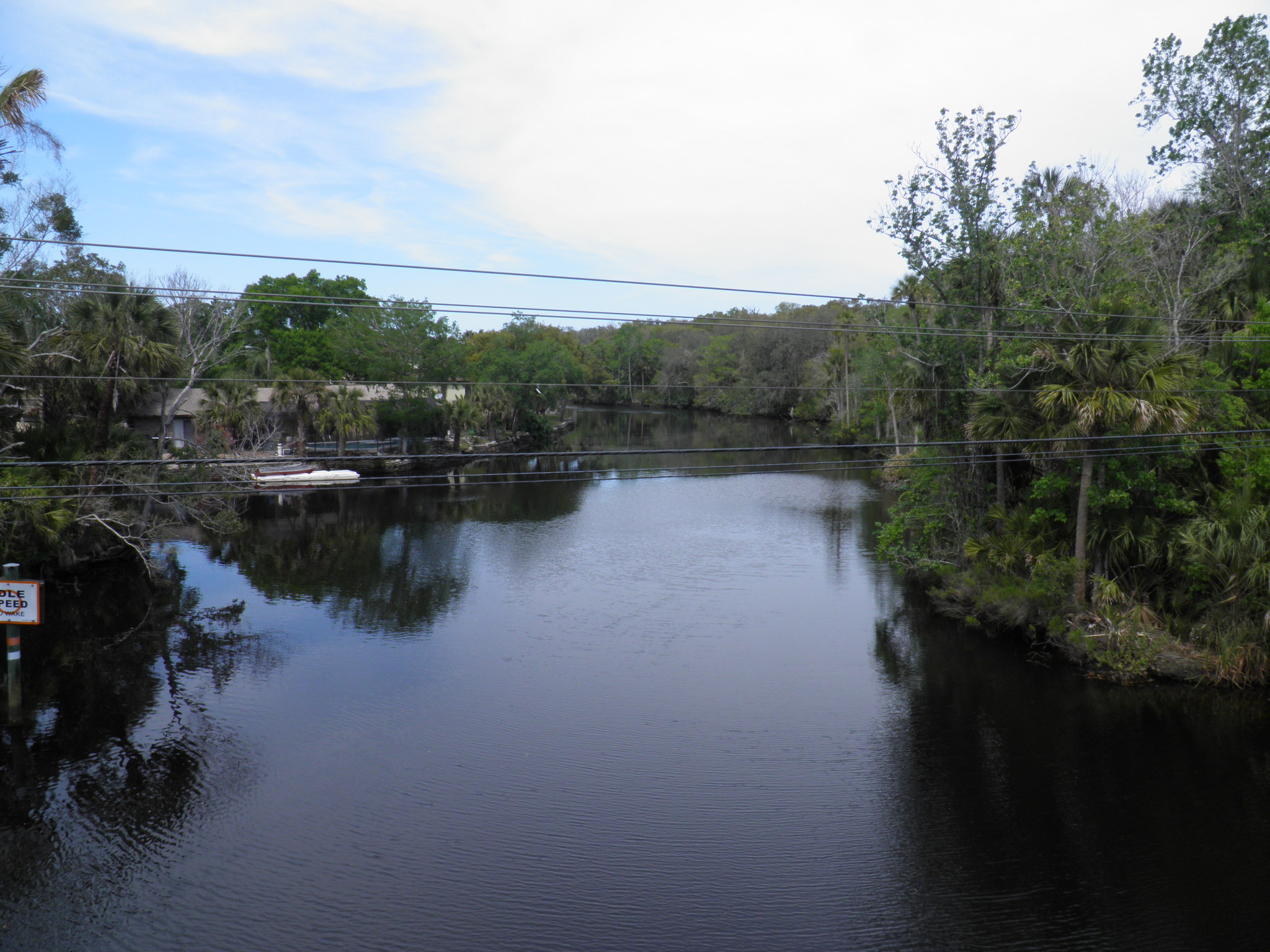
- Tomoka River in Ormond Beach

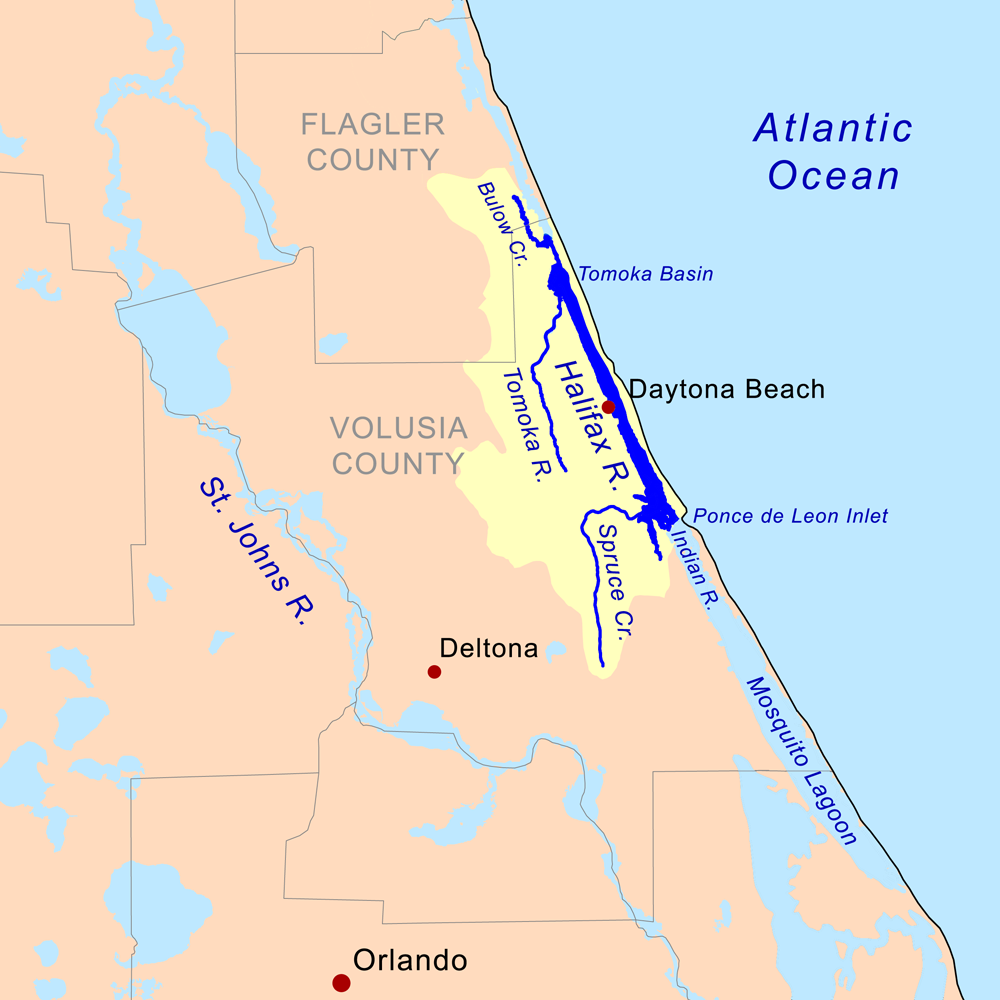
- Halifax River watershed

Location
- Country: United States
- State: Florida
- Counties: Volusia
- District: SJRWMD

Physical characteristics
- Source: Tomoka Farms
  - location: Daytona Beach, Florida
  - coordinates: 29°08′12″N 81°04′47″W
- Mouth: Halifax River
  - location: Ormond Beach, Florida
  - coordinates: 29°21′38″N 81°05′28″W
- Length: 20 mi (32 km)
- Basin size: 110 sq mi (280 km^{2})

Basin features
- Tributaries
  - left: Little Tomoka River

The Tomoka River is a north-flowing river in Volusia County, Florida, United States. It drains an area of about 110 square miles (280 km^{2}) and has a length of 19.6 miles (31.5 km).

== Geography ==
The Tomoka rises in the forests of Volusia County between Port Orange and Daytona Beach at an elevation of 23 feet (7.0 m). The river then flows north-northeast, passing through the cities of Daytona Beach and Ormond Beach until it empties into the Halifax River. Near its mouth the river passes through the Tomoka Marsh Aquatic Preserve and Tomoka State Park. It also runs next to the Ormond Beach Municipal Airport and Addison Blockhouse Historic State Park.

=== Manatee sanctuary ===
The river and several of its tributaries (Strickland, Thompson and Dodson Creek) are designated as a manatee sanctuary. Other threatened species that inhabit the river basin include the wood stork and Atlantic salt marsh snake. The bald eagle can also be found in and around the river basin.

=== Paddling trail ===
There is a 13 miles (21 km) long designated paddling trail from the Riverbend Nature Park to the Tomoka State Park. This trail is unusual as it actually leads 4 miles (6.4 km) upstream from the put-in point, until the river becomes too narrow to continue, then turns around to continue 8 miles (13 km) to the end. The Florida Department of Environmental Protection recommends this paddling trail for beginners.

== List of crossings ==
Crossing	Carries	Image	Location	Coordinates
Headwaters				29°08′12″N 81°04′47″W
	private road		Daytona Beach	29°08′23″N 81°04′50″W
	private road		Daytona Beach	29°08′48″N 81°05′09″W
790103/790104	Interstate 4		Daytona Beach	29°09′02″N 81°05′14″W
790021/790097	US 92; International Speedway Boulevard		Daytona Beach	29°09′51″N 81°05′26″W
	power line maintenance road		Holly Hill	29°11′43″N 81°05′57″W
11th Street Bridge; 794038	CR 4019; LPGA Boulevard		Holly Hill	29°13′02″N 81°06′35″W
790027/790163	SR 40; Granada Boulevard		Ormond Beach	29°15′17″N 81°07′25″W
Confluence with Little Tomoka River			Ormond Beach	29°15′27″N 81°07′24″W
790077/790078	Interstate 95		Ormond Beach	29°15′46″N 81°07′05″W
Island			Ormond Beach	29°16′58″N 81°06′06″W
rail bridge	FEC		Ormond Beach	29°18′16″N 81°05′45″W
790185/790186	US 1 Yonge Street		Ormond Beach	29°18′19″N 81°05′39″W
794016	Old Dixie Highway		Ormond Beach	29°20′32″N 81°05′11″W
Mouth				29°21′38″N 81°05′28″W

== See also ==
- Daytona Beach, Florida
- Ormond Beach, Florida
- Tomoka State Park
