= Nocoroco =

Archaeological site in Florida, United States

- U.S. National Register of Historic Places
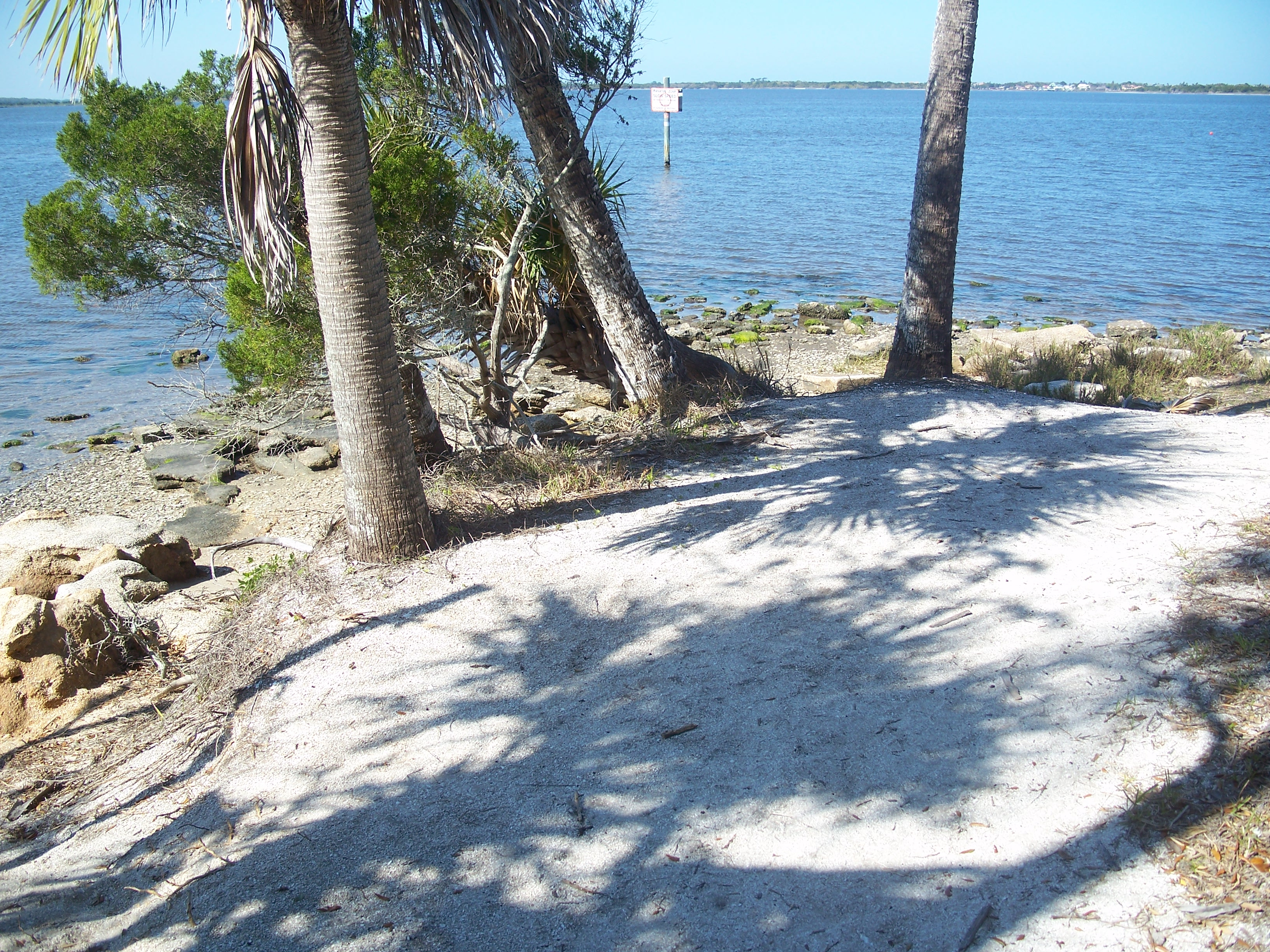

- Location within Volusia County
- Nearest city: Ormond Beach, Florida
- Coordinates: 29°21′7″N 81°5′14″W
- NRHP reference No.: 73000605
- Added to NRHP: May 7, 1973

Nocoroco is the site of a Timucuan village located on the Tomoka River, in Tomoka State Park. The park is located two or three miles north of Ormond Beach, Florida on North Beach Street.

== History ==
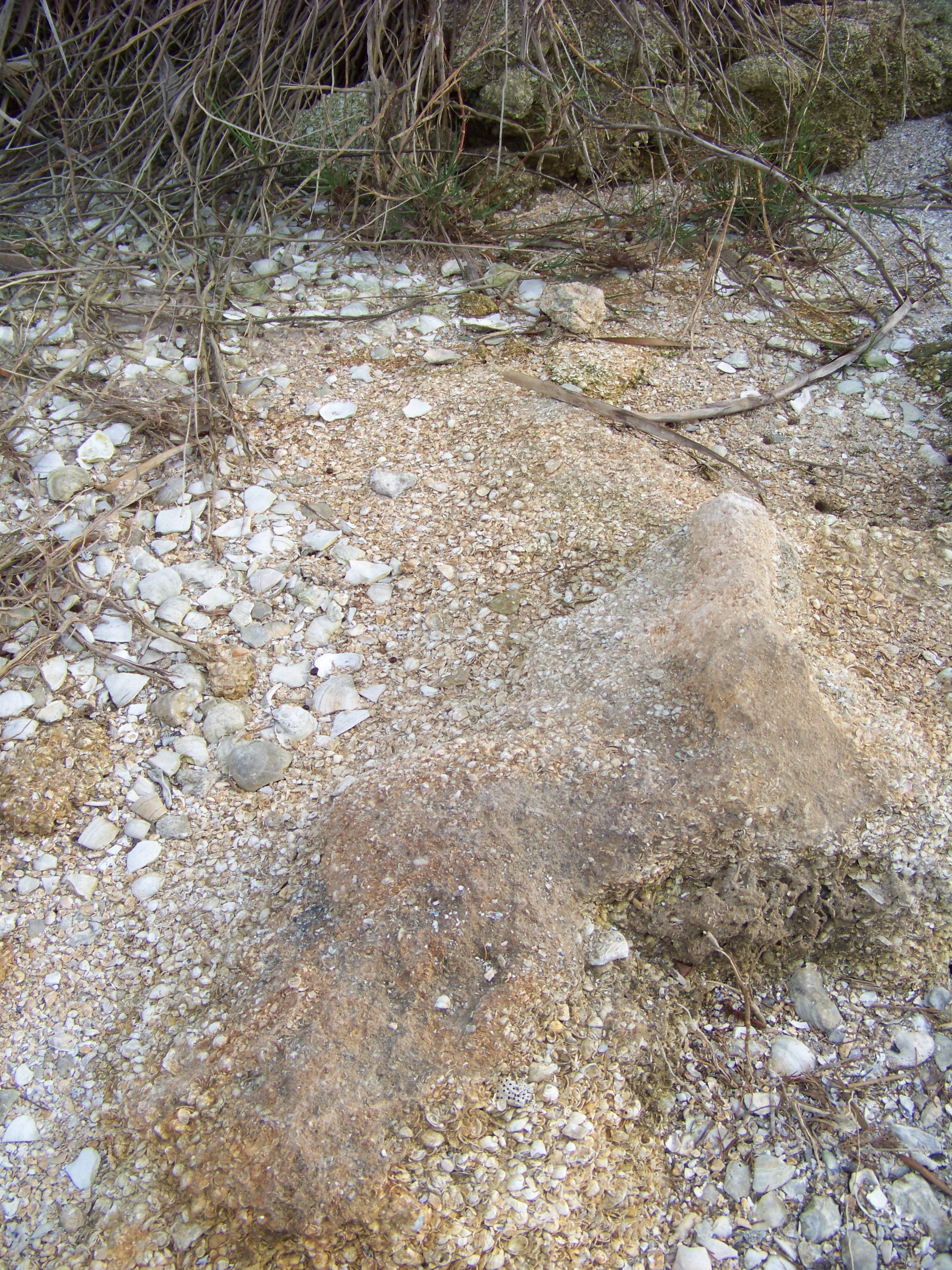
small shell midden at Nocoroco

Approximately seven thousand years ago, during the Archaic Period, Indigenous people found plentiful fish and shellfish at this site in the shelter of a barrier island to the east. The site was inhabited approximately twelve hundred years ago by the Timucuans, whose descendants were discovered there by Europeans. Alvaro Mexia visited Nocoroco in 1605, just as European acculturation had begun. Mexia's expedition explored down the east coast of Florida at the behest of the Spanish governor. This late St. Johns period site represents one of the last Timucuan strongholds in northeastern Florida. The only traces of these native peoples are the shell middens, which help modern archaeologists document their lives.

The British occupation began in 1763 when Great Britain received Florida from Spain in a trade. The site of the village of Nocoroco was part of a British land-grant called Mt. Oswald, held by Richard Oswald. His plantation grew indigo and rice. After its return to the Spanish in 1783, the area was likely cultivated until many plantations were destroyed near the beginning of the Second Seminole War in 1835.

== Site archeology ==
The midden at Nocoroco is mainly composed largely of a black earth accumulation, with pockets of shell and a few larger shell accumulations. The midden differs from most common middens in the region, which are mostly shell. Shell types include Crassostrea virginica, Mercenaria mercenaria, Tagelus plebeius, Arca sp., Donax variabilis, Geukensia demissa, Sinistrofulgur perversum, and Hexaplex fulvescens. Animal bones were not preserved well and typically were quite fragmentary. Among mammals, the most prevalent source of food seems to have been deer, but other types of bones, such as fish, turtle and alligator remains, were all present.

== NRHP listing ==
On May 7, 1973, it was added to the U.S. National Register of Historic Places as a site significant for its information potential in the area of aboriginal history.

== Present day ==
Today the site of the village of Nocoroco is marked by a large fountain sculpture, called the "Tomokie Fountain", created by Frederick Dana Marsh. The fountain is Marsh's artistic interpretation of the legend of Tomokie, whose arrogance in drinking from a sacred spring was paid for with his life and those of all his band. According to information at the site, references to the legend date back more than one hundred years.
