= Ormond Mound =

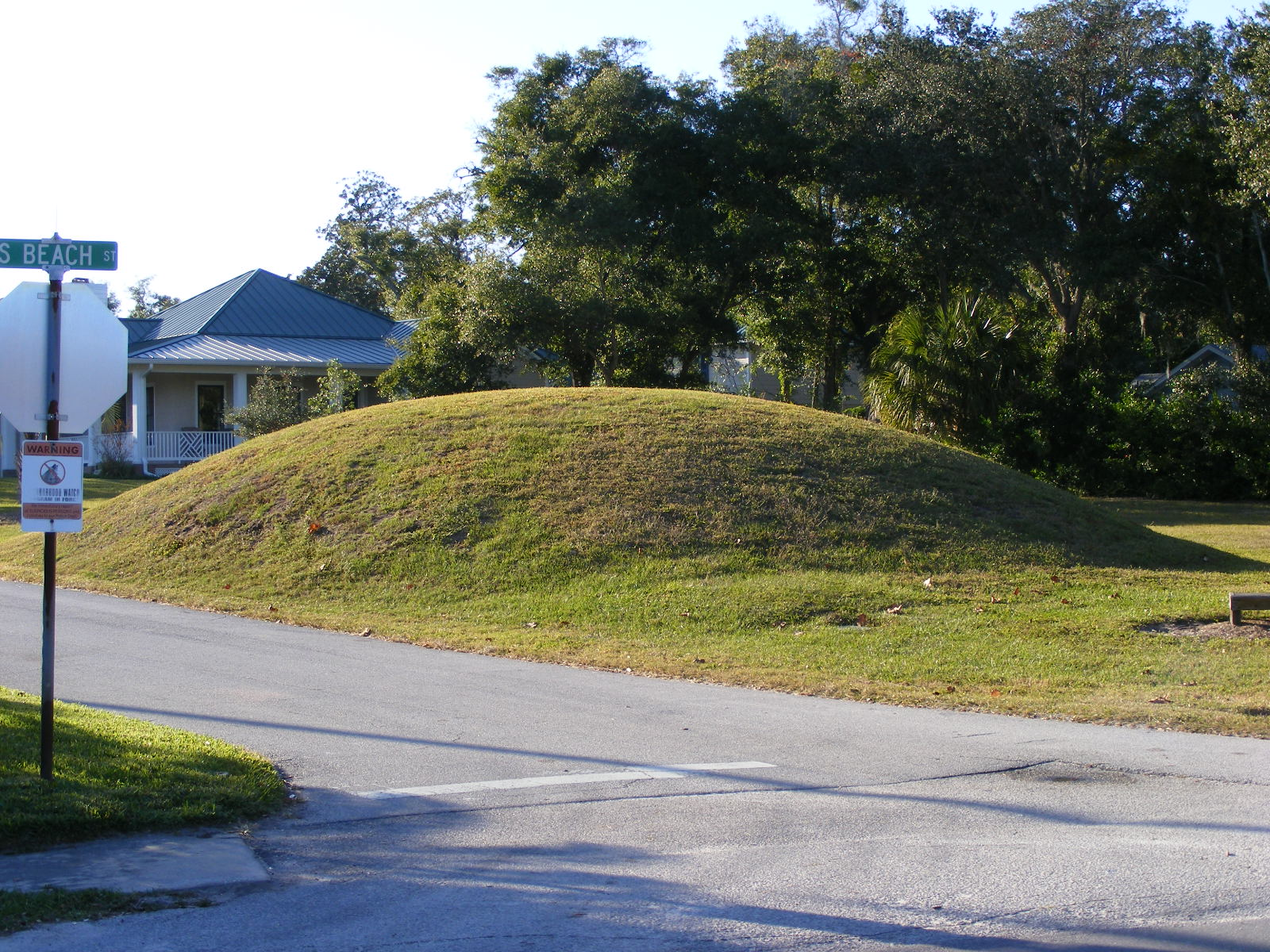

- Location within Volusia County
- 29°16′48.5″N 81°3′12.4″W
- Location: Indian Mound Park, Volusia County, Florida
- Nearest city: Ormond Beach, Florida

Site notes
- Governing body: City of Ormond Beach

Ormond Mound is a Pre-Columbian burial mound of the St. Johns culture, in Ormond Beach, Volusia County, Florida, US.

== Overview ==
The Ormond Mound (a burial mound that can be classified as an earthwork or conical mound and is defined as a heap of earth placed over prehistoric tombs or remains) has been preserved as an intact burial mound in eastern Florida. The site was turned into a city park in 1982 due to the efforts of the community. In 1982, the owner of the property that the mound was constructed on wanted the mound removed. Controversy surfaced in the community as the property owner attempted to level the land in order to build a house. As a result of public outrage, the community’s and Volusia Anthropological Society's demand for the site to be classified as a historical monument, the Ormond Mound and surrounding area was purchased by the city. Government officials hired archaeologists in an effort to validate who built the site and for what purpose. The archaeologists concluded that the mound was constructed by Timucuan Indians, also identified as the St. Johns people. The Timucuan were inhabitants of the area before European settlers.

== History ==
It has been estimated that over 100 individual burials are in Ormond Mound, based on salvage excavations that were conducted in 1982. As more bodies were deposited into the area and were covered with sand and other minerals, the earthwork took its "distinctive mounded appearance". Most of these remains were laid to rest during the late St. Johns period, after A.D. 800. The remains were oftentimes buried with their most prized possessions. Apart from human bones, items found after the site was analyzed included utensils, Indian beads, Spanish trading beads, and pottery sherds.

A charnel house, a structure used to store bodies prior to burial, was located near the Ormond Mound. These structures were separate from the village and were used by the St. Johns people to prepare the corpses of mostly high-ranking and important people for the afterlife. The dead were laid out on wooden racks and allowed to decompose. A charnel house attendant, usually a high priest or a bonepicker, would carefully remove the flesh from the bones as they decomposed. The job of a bonepicker was known throughout the community as one of the most prestigious jobs to have.

After the bodies dried away, the charnel house priest would end up with individual sets of cleaned bones.. Each set of bones was bundled up and buried in mounds during special ceremonies. This method accounts for the many skeletons found in burial mounds.

== Gallery ==
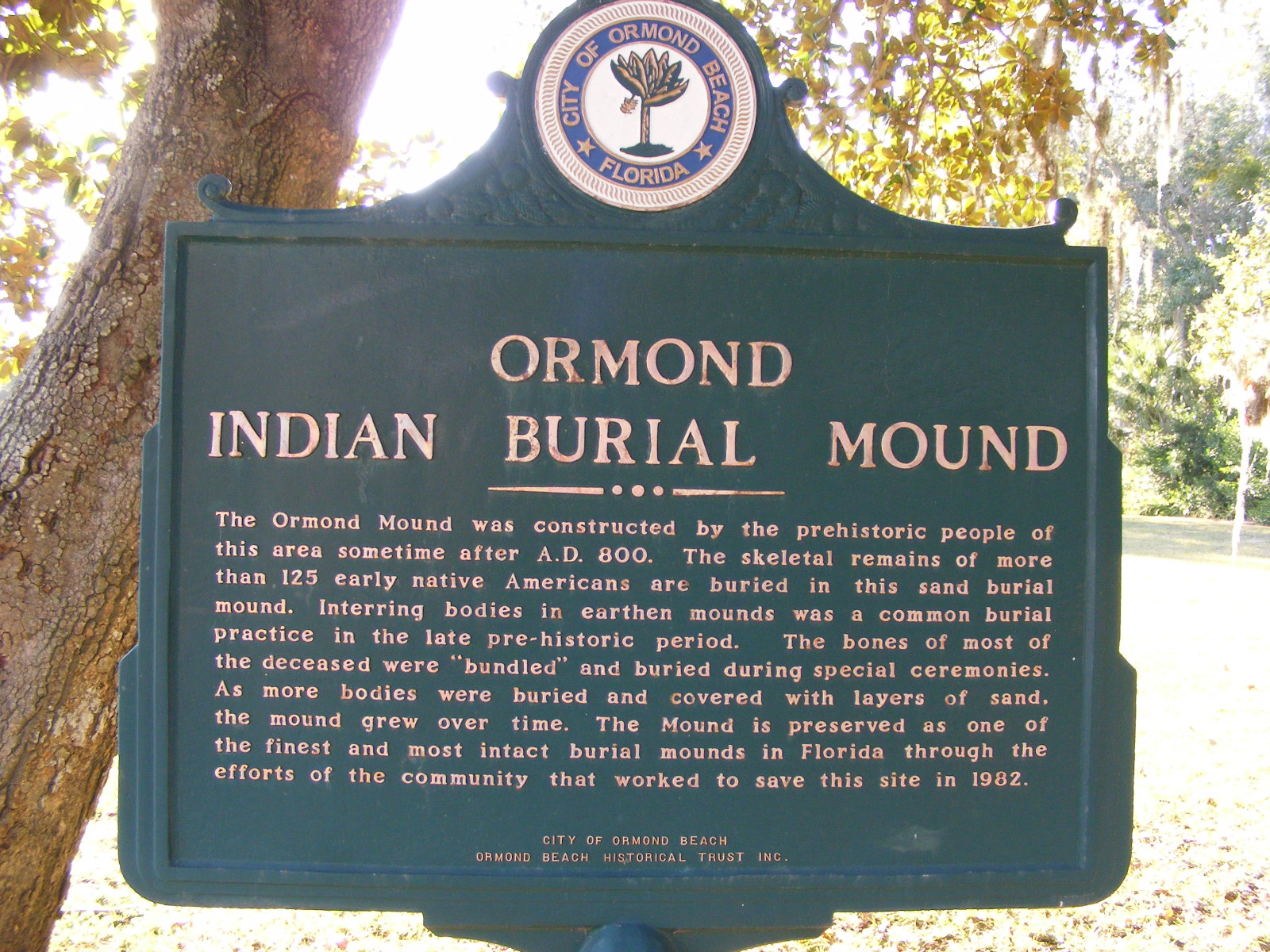

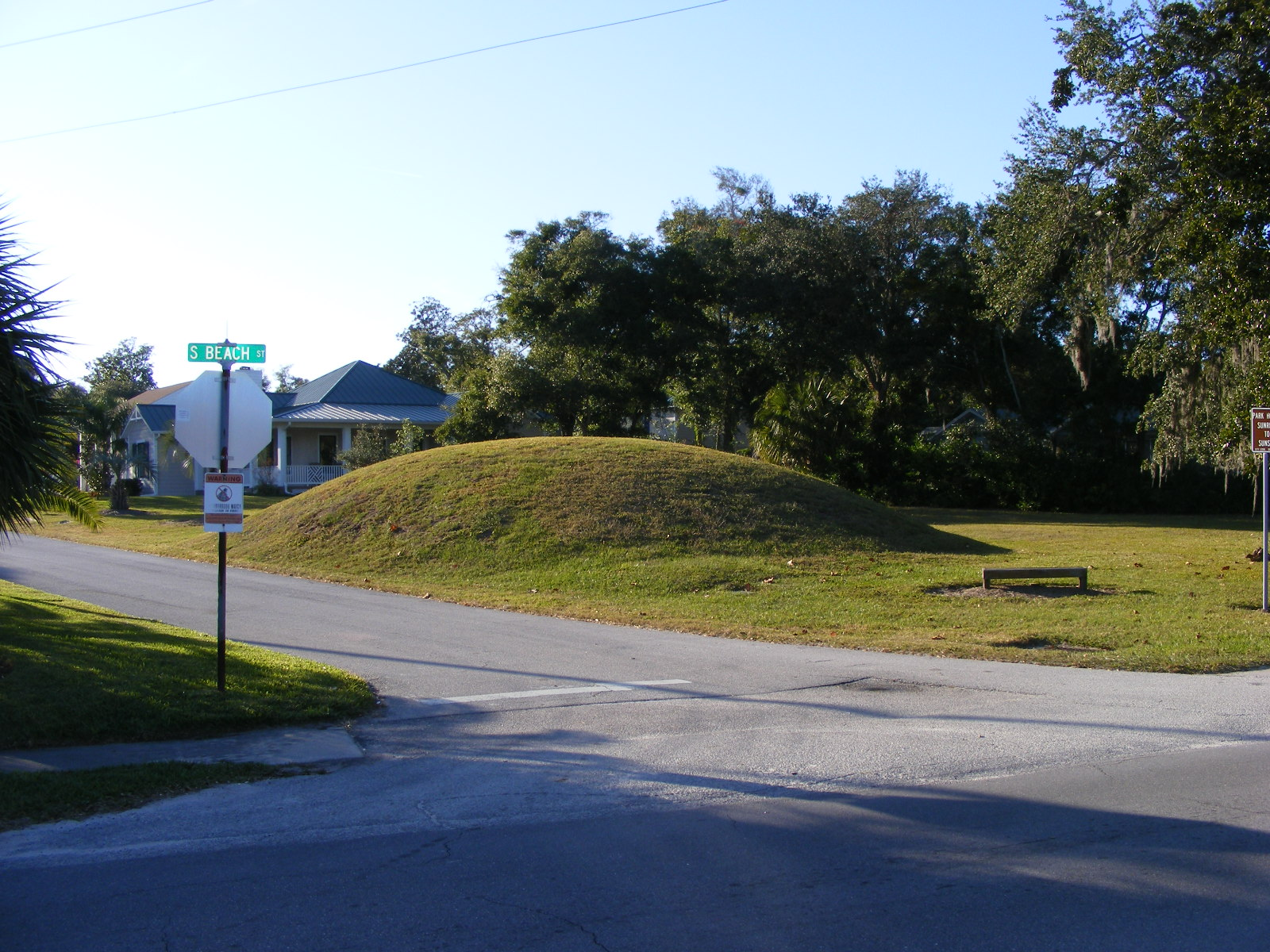

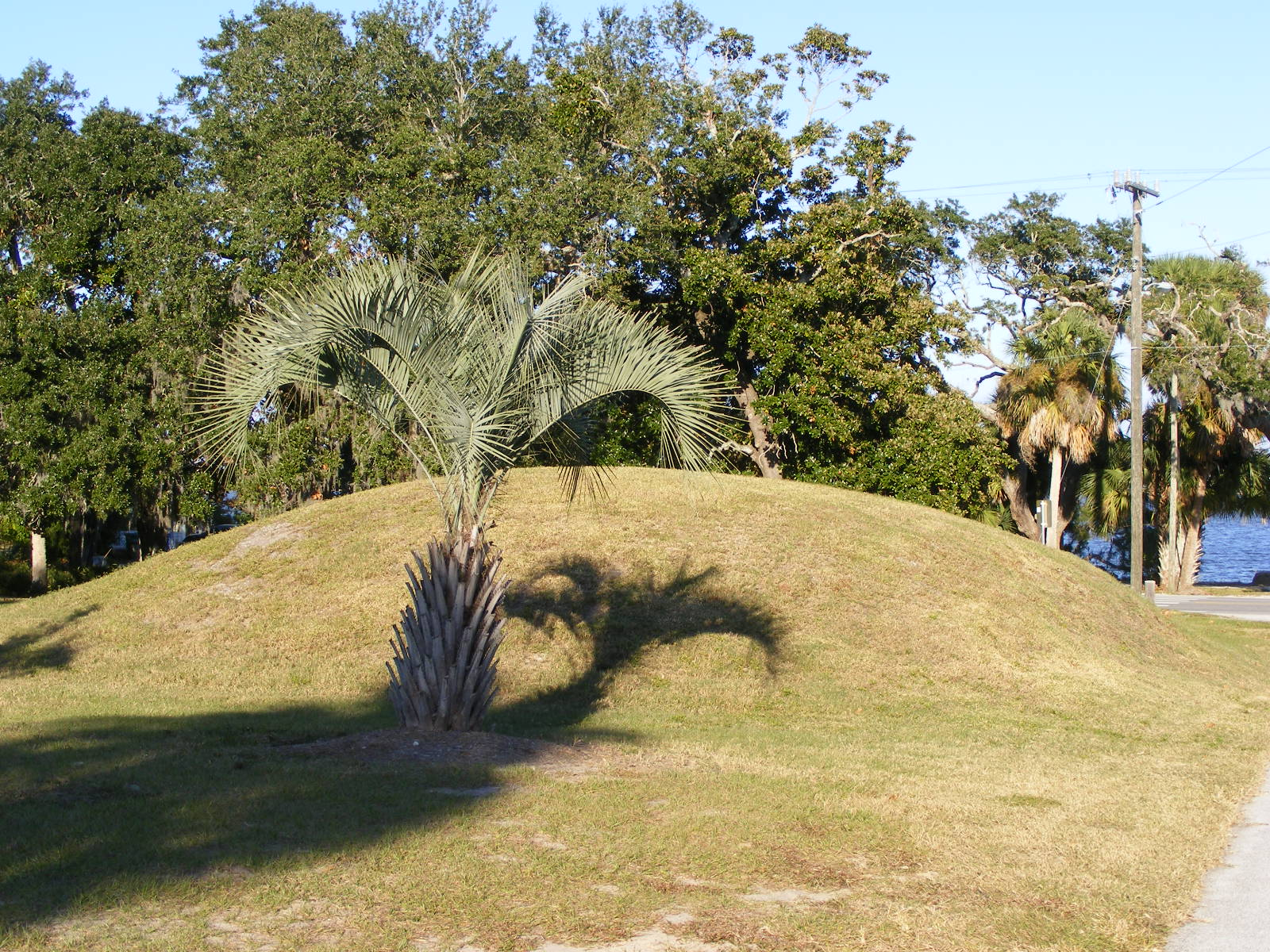

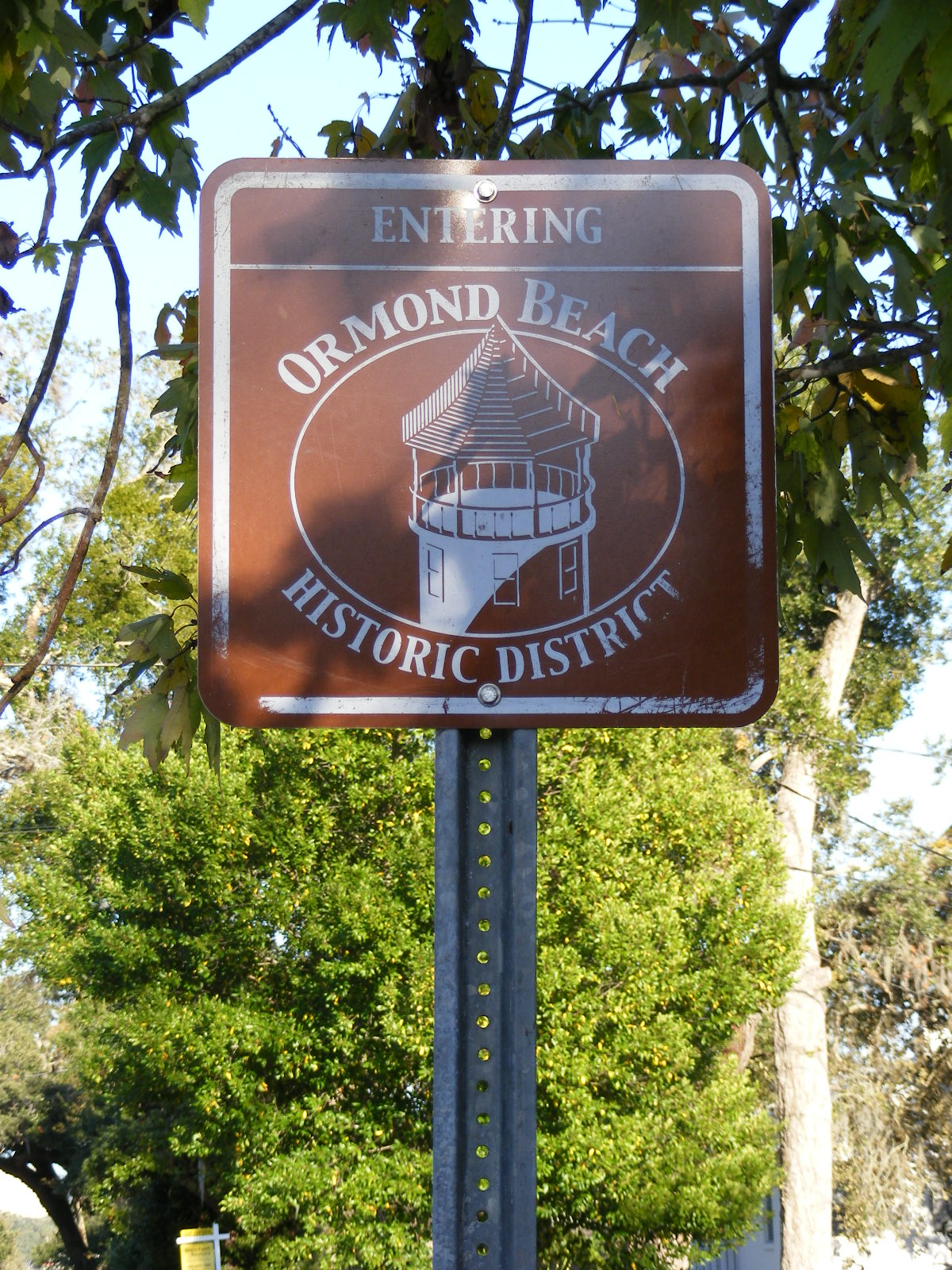

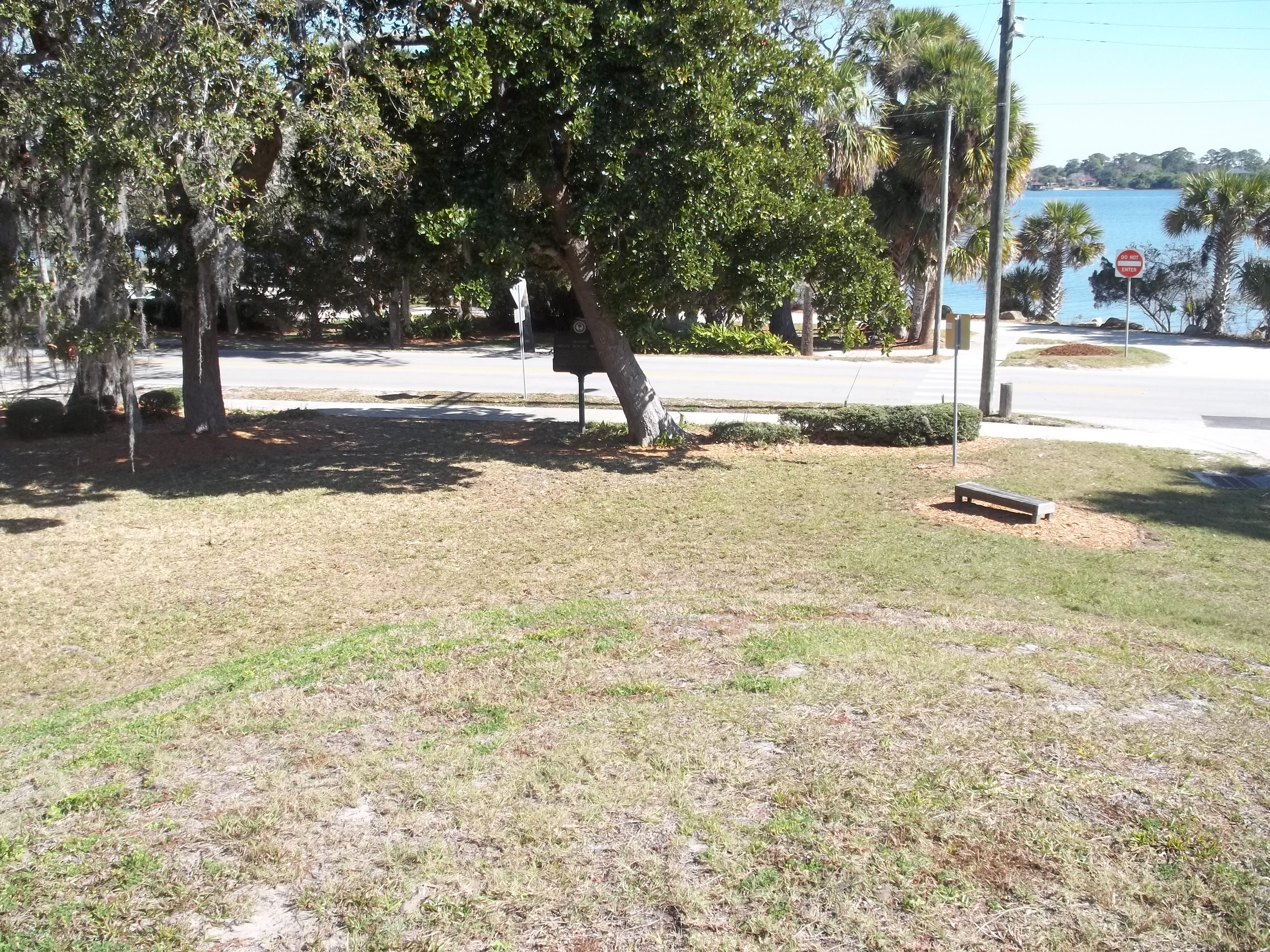
