= Tomoka State Park =

State park in Florida, United States

- IUCN category IV (habitat/species management area)
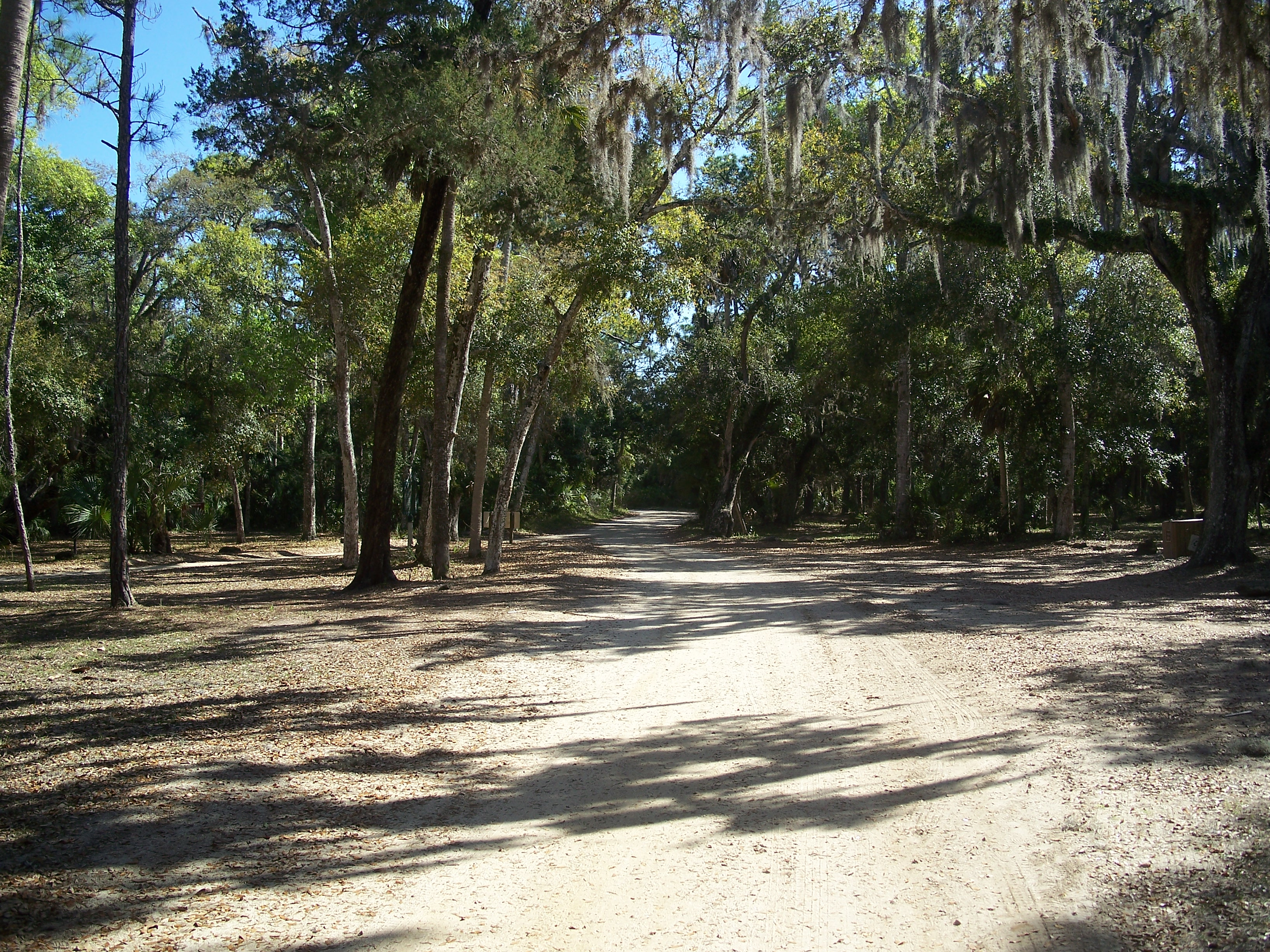
- Road through the park

- Location within Florida Location within the United States
- Interactive map of Tomoka State Park
- Location: Volusia County, Florida, United States
- Nearest city: Ormond Beach, Florida
- Coordinates: 29°19′55″N 81°04′52″W
- Area: 1,800 acres (7.3 km^{2})
- Established: 1945
- Governing body: Florida Department of Environmental Protection

Tomoka State Park is an 2,000-acre (8.1 km^{2}) Florida State Park located along the Tomoka River, three miles (5 km) north of Ormond Beach on North Beach Street.

== Fauna ==
Among the wildlife of the park are West Indian manatees, alligators, white-tailed deer, gopher tortoises, bobcats, and 160 species of birds. Seasonal birds of prey include the bald eagle, peregrine falcon, and northern harrier. The park's wading birds include egrets, herons, wood stork and American white ibis.

== Historic status ==
Within the park is the site of the Timucuan village of Nocoroco, located on the Tomoka River. Researchers suggest that the land containing the Tomoka Mound Complex just south of the Nocoroco village site was occupied as early as 5000 B.C. It was also the location of a plantation owned by Richard Oswald, a wealthy Scottish merchant, who owned the plantation throughout the British rule of Florida. It became a state park in 1945. On May 7, 1973, it was added to the U.S. National Register of Historic Places.

== Recreational activities ==
Activities include canoeing, boating, and fishing, as well as hiking, camping, picnicking, and wildlife viewing.

Other amenities include a one-half mile nature trail, a paved 1 mile multiuse trail, a boat ramp, five picnic areas, ample areas for fishing, and one hundred campsites.

== Hours ==
Florida state parks are open between 8 a.m. and Midnight every day of the year (including holidays).

== Gallery ==
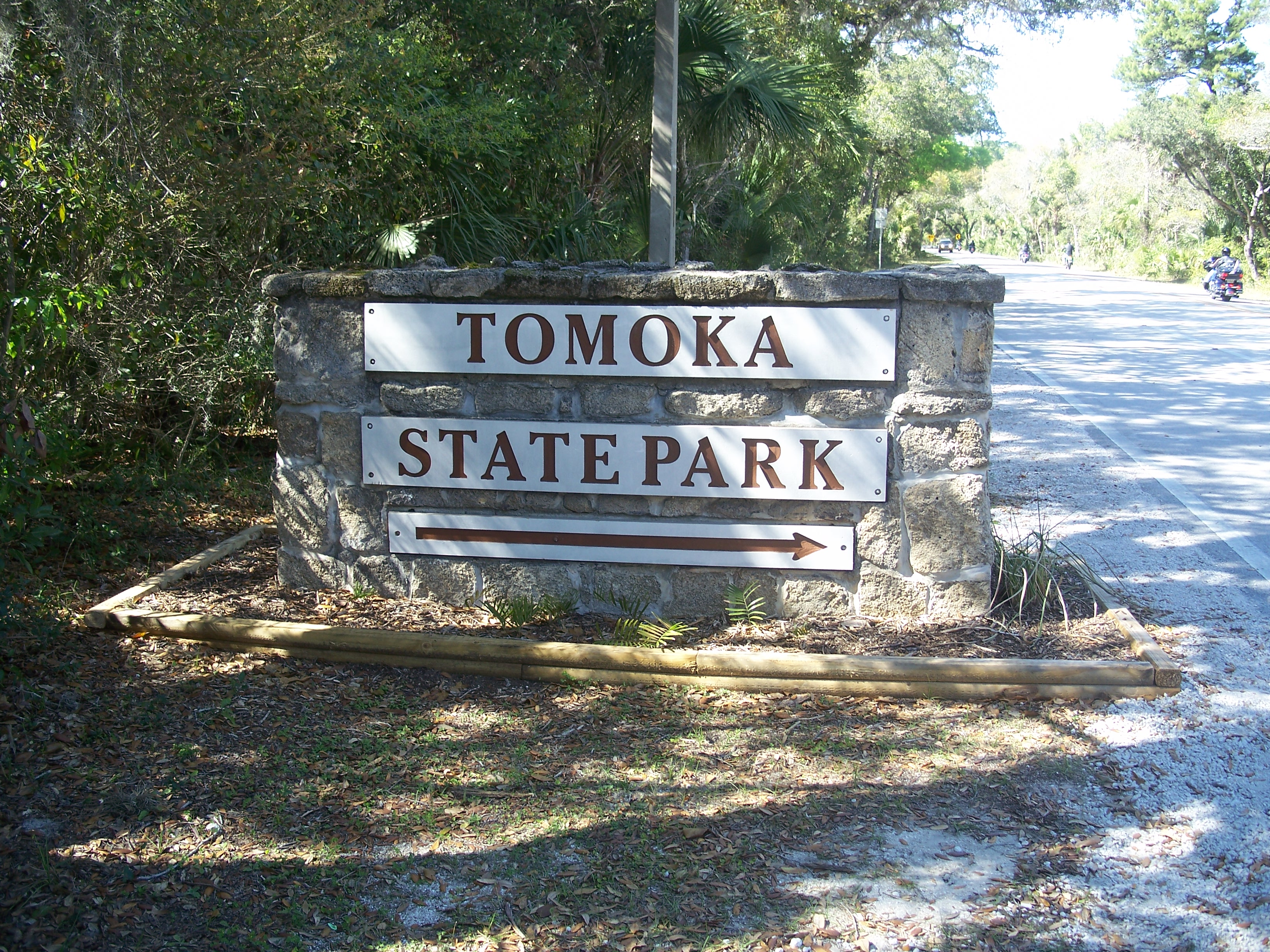
Sign

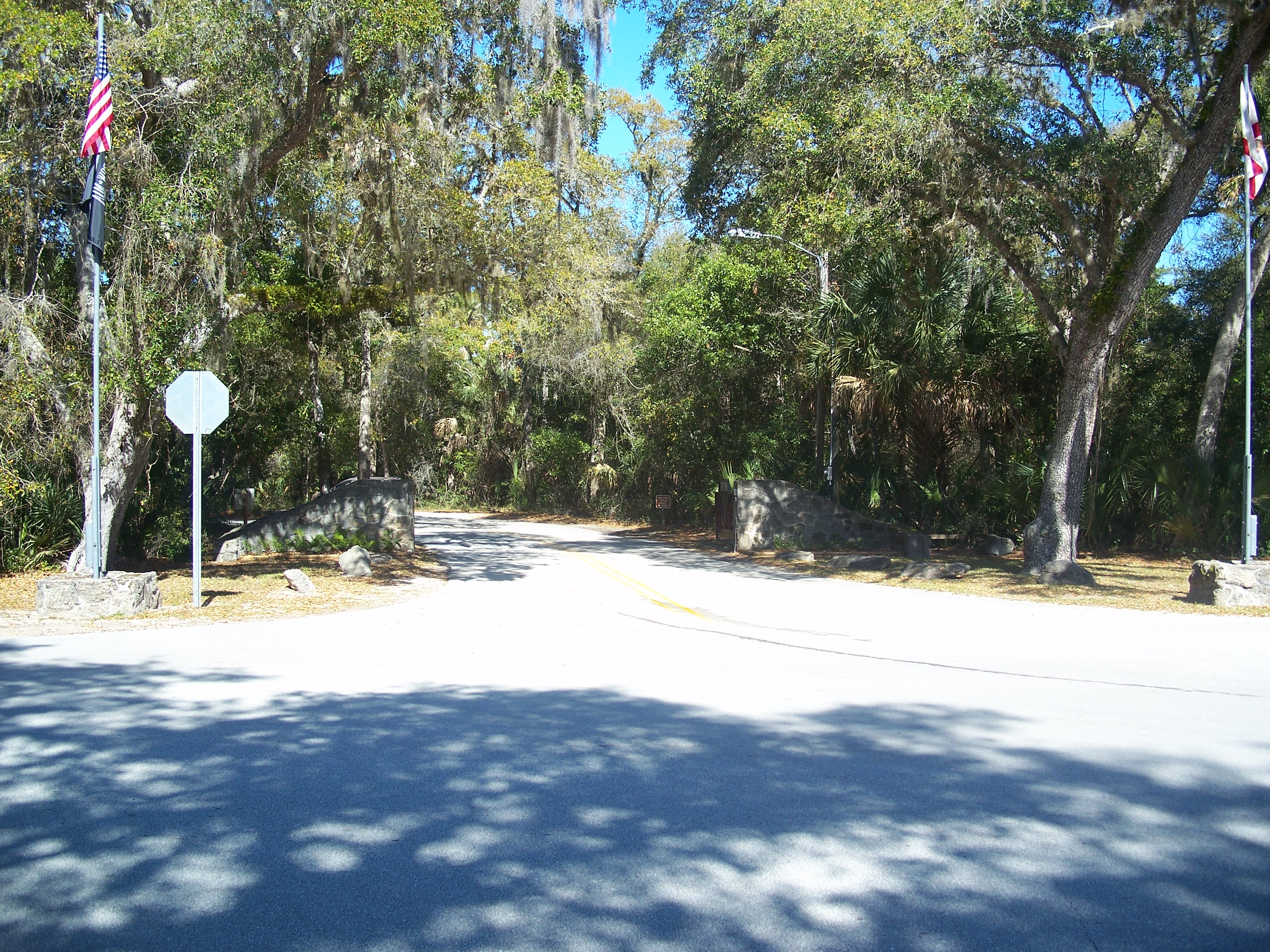
Entrance

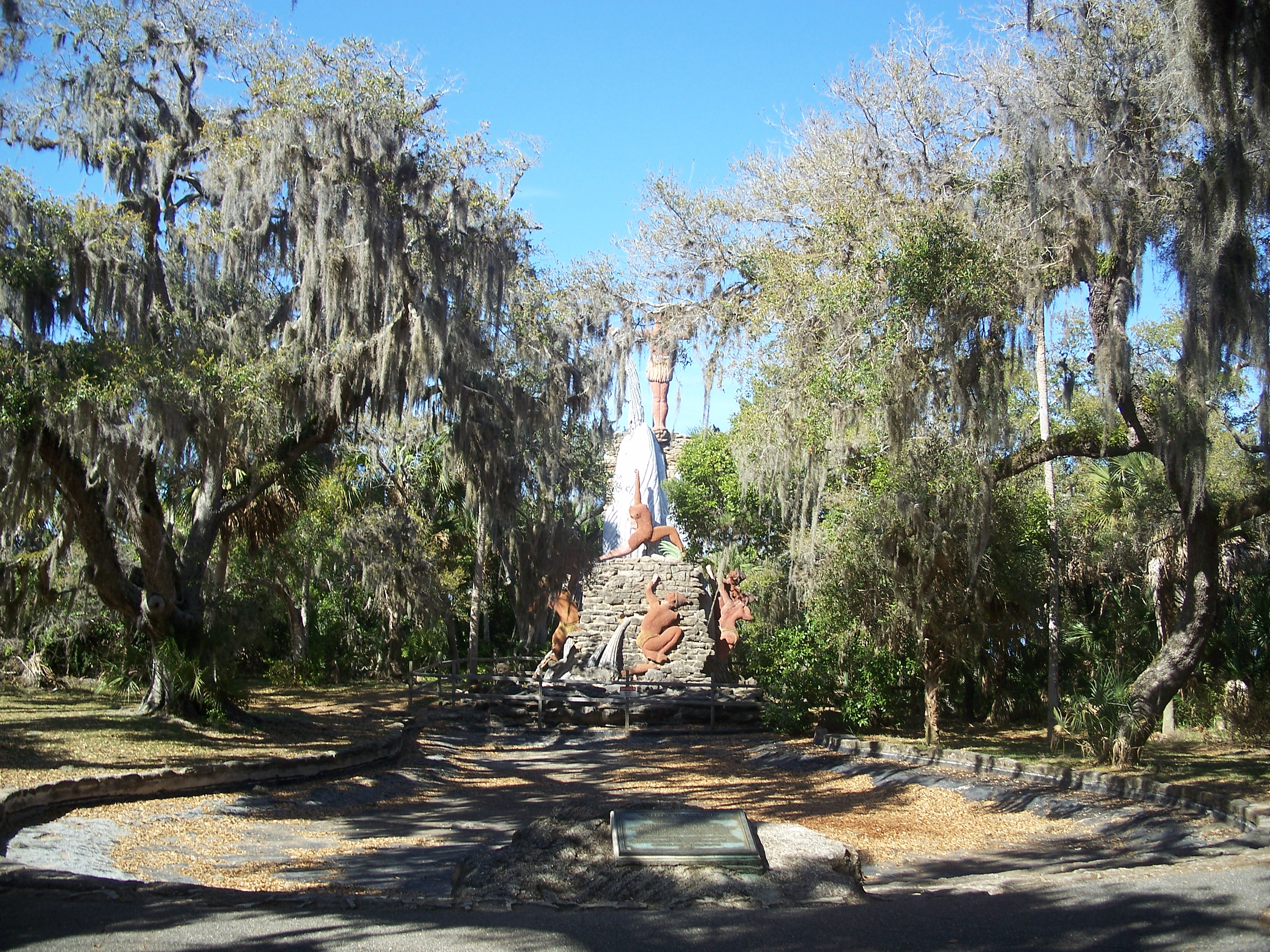
Sculpture of "Chief Tomokie"
