= Postle =

- Arthur Postle (1881–1965), Australian athlete
- David E. Postle (1863–1939), American architecture
- Herbert Postle (1884–1961), Australian politician
- Joy Postle (1896–1989), American environmentalist
- Martin Postle (born 1950), British art historian
- Matt Postle (born 1970), Welsh racing cyclist

== See also ==
- Postles (surname)
