= John Anderson Lodge =

Historic house that has been demolished in Florida, United States

- Formerly listed on the U.S. National Register of Historic Places
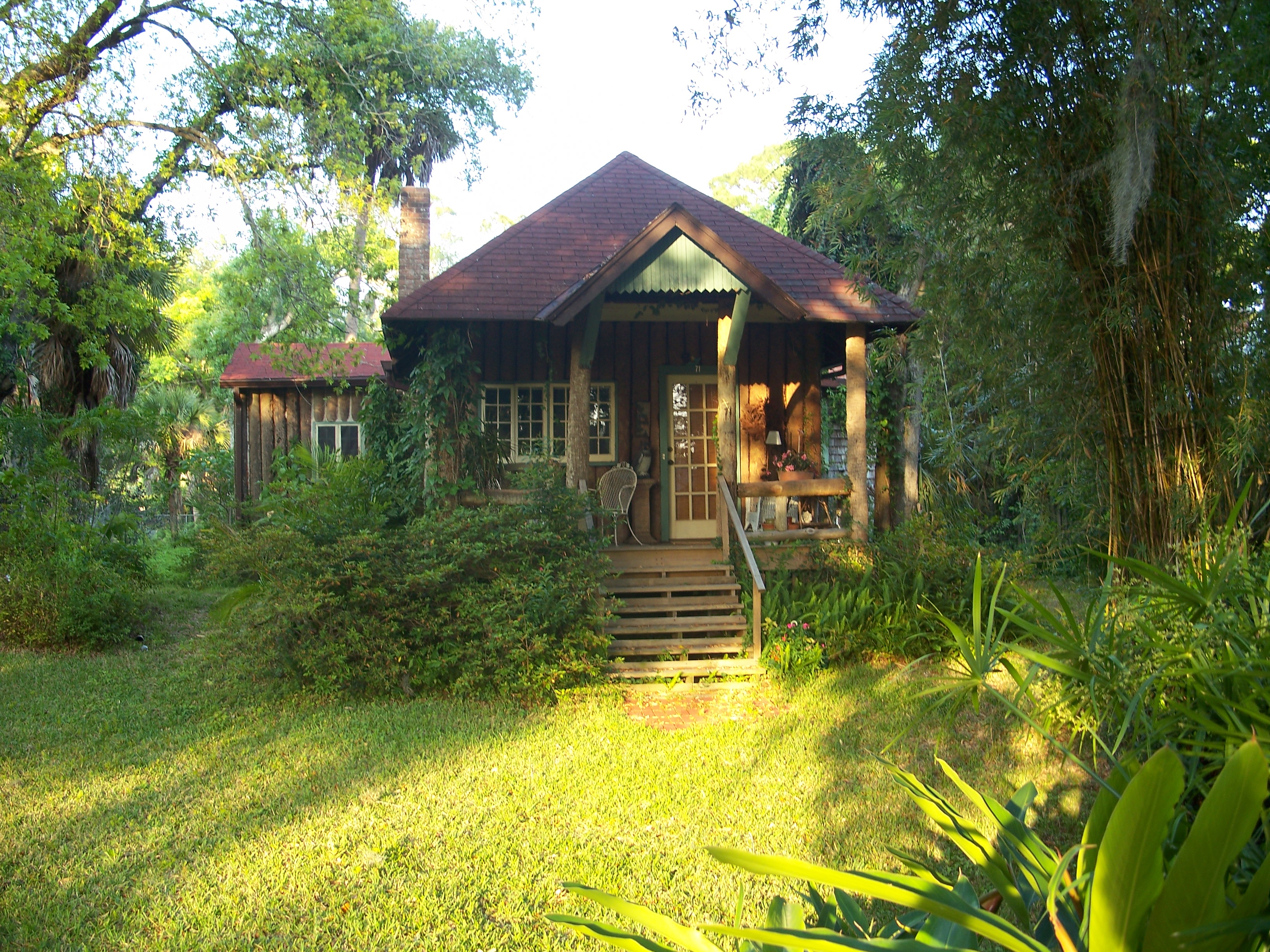

- Location within Volusia County
- Location: Ormond Beach, Florida
- Coordinates: 29°17′26″N 81°2′50″W
- MPS: Historic Winter Residences of Ormond Beach, 1878–1925 MPS
- NRHP reference No.: 88001717

Significant dates
- Added to NRHP: September 6, 1989
- Removed from NRHP: August 22, 2023

The John Anderson Lodge was an historic home built around 1886 at 71 Orchard Lane in Ormond Beach, Florida, United States. It was built for Ormond Beach promoter John Anderson (1853–1911), who was one of the first owners of the Ormond Hotel. The lodge was originally used by employees of the hotel and to host parties. In its later years it became a single family residence. The lodge was built in the Adirondack Rustic architectural style on pilings and featured vertical palm tree wall construction. Palm trees are typically inappropriate for building construction due to their soft and fibrous consistency. The designers of the lodge used native Florida materials to blend into the context of the local natural environment.

== National Register of Historic Places ==
The John Anderson Lodge was added onto the National Register of Historic Places on September 6, 1989.

== State of Disrepair ==
By 2017, the structure was in a bad state of disrepair as termites infested much of the building's wood, the original floors were missing in much of the building, and there were several holes in the walls and roof that were allowing water to continue to damage the interior. The most significant damage was related to the pilings which sank and jeopardized the structure's stability. To fix the pilings the structure would have had to be lifted up and suspended in the air during repairs. It was determined that the weakened walls and roof were not strong enough and would have most likely crumbled apart.

In October 2018, a non-destructive inspection of the foundation by EMS Forensic Associates, LLC. determined that the structure was most likely beyond economic repair.

== Demolition ==
On August 6, 2019, the City of Ormond Beach, Florida issued Demolition Permit number 19-00005662. The John Anderson Lodge was demolished in September 2019.

== Delisting from the National Register of Historic Places ==
In July 2022, a petition to delist the John Anderson Lodge from the National Register of Historic Places was sent to the Florida Department of Historic Resources. On August 22, 2023, the National Park Service officially removed (delisted) the John Anderson Lodge from the National Register of Historic Places.

== Gallery ==
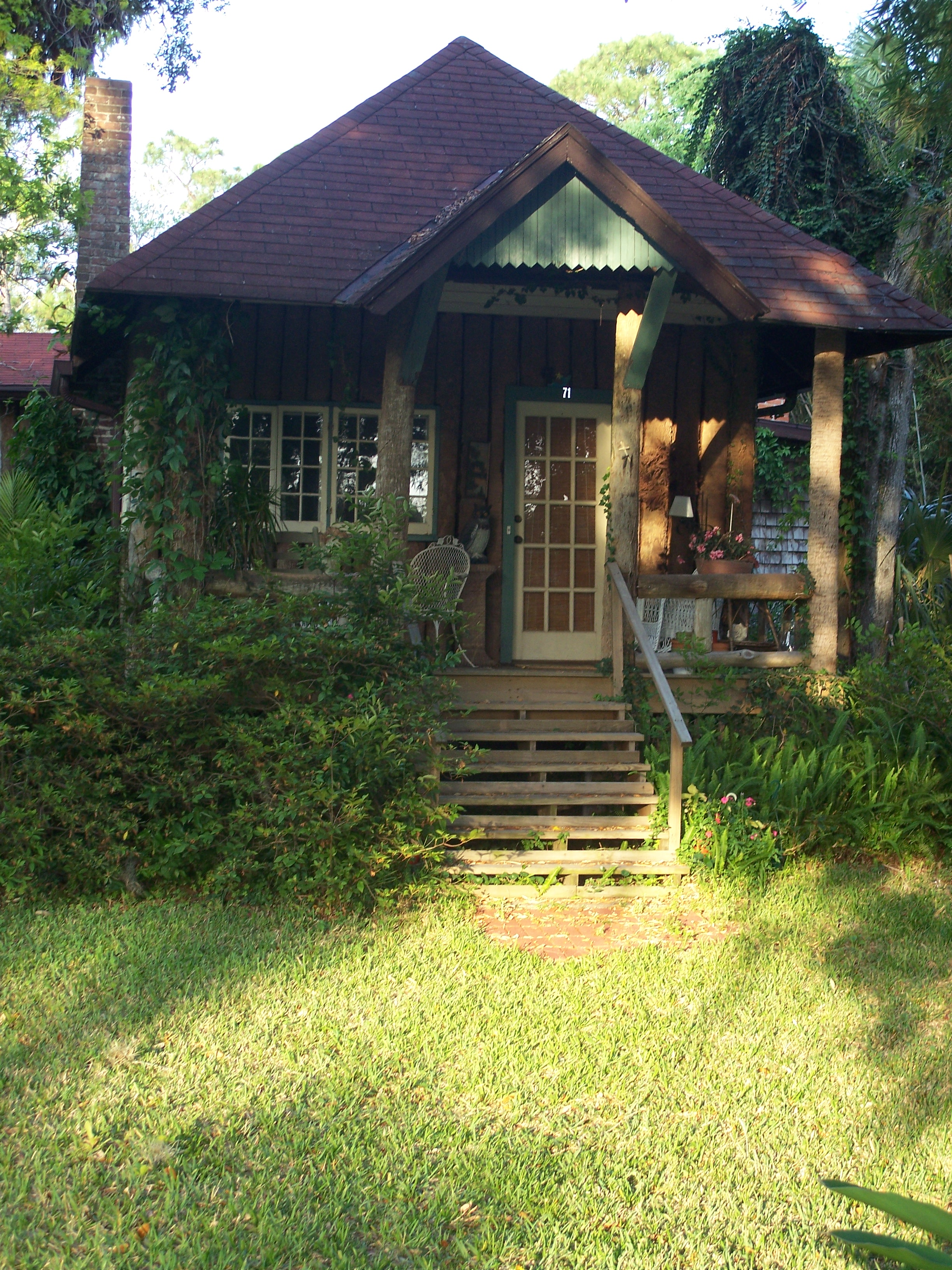

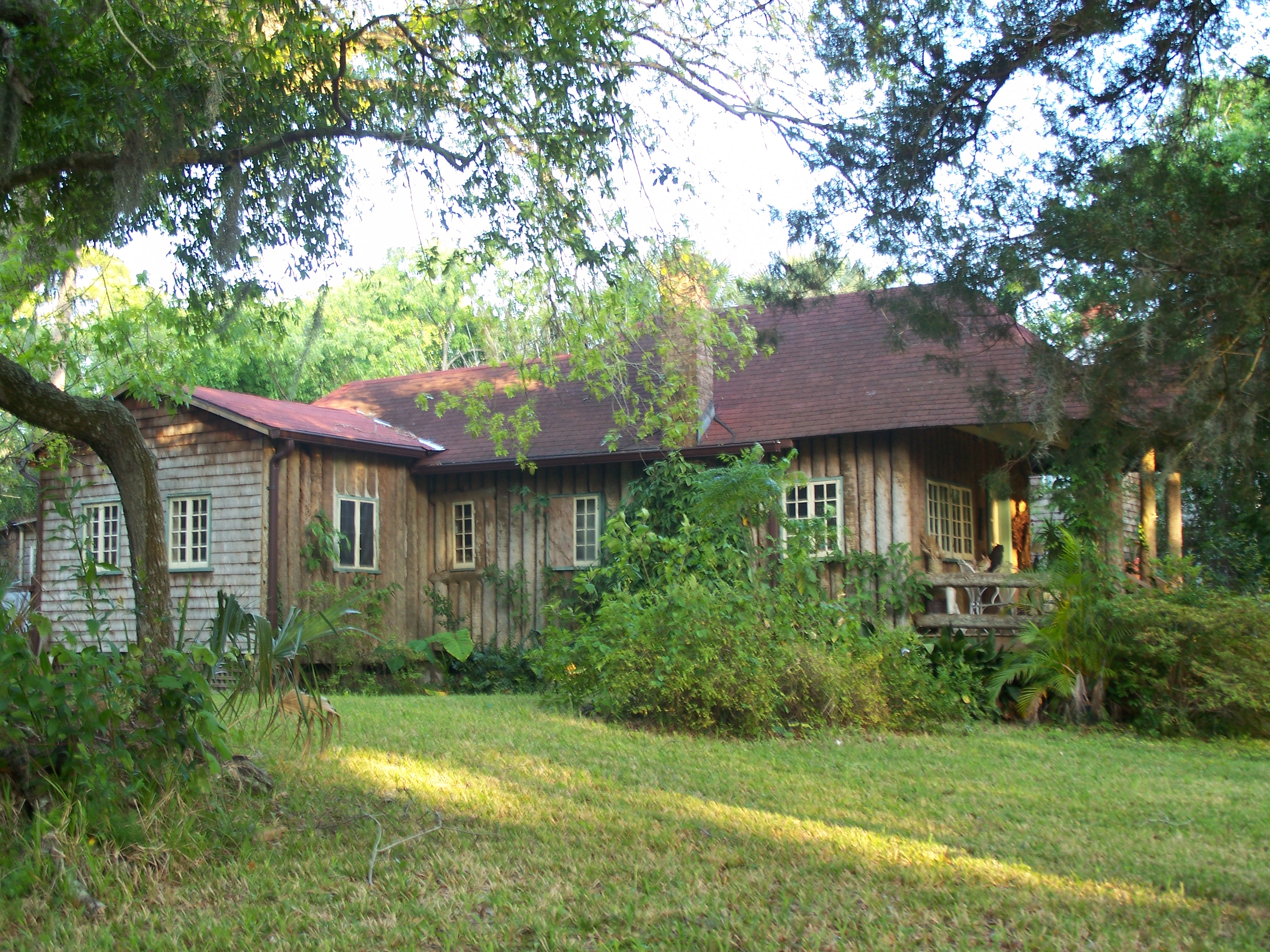
