= Joy Postle =

American painter (1896–1989)

Joy Postle (1896–1989) was a pioneering American environmental artist and creator of celebrated murals depicting Florida wildlife.

== Early years and education ==
Katherine Joy Postle was born on January 20, 1896, in Chicago to architect Oliver Hambleton Postle (1851-1900) and Mary M. Brown. She was raised in an atmosphere of respect for aesthetic achievement. Postle's father was well known in Chicago architectural circles, having served as treasurer of the Chicago Artists Business Association in 1900. In partnership with David E. Postle (1863-1939) his professional offices were in the Marquette Building (Chicago) and they advertised in the House Beautiful magazine — a magazine begun by Frank Lloyd Wright's friends and clients Chanucey Williams and William Herman Winslow's Auvergne Press. Among other works, the Postle firm created the neo-classical Pattington Apartments of 1903., the Prairie Style David E Postle House in Elgin, Illinois, and the Masonic Temple in Elgin, Illinois. Joy earned a scholarship to attend the Art Institute of Chicago where she studied music and art. After graduation, Postle went west to rural Idaho and became certified to teach music and art.

== Career in Idaho ==
Postle and her brother Vernon bought a ranch in southern Idaho along the Snake River Canyon. Postle often saddled her horse and rode into the hills or desert to sketch during the 1920s while she lived on the ranch. Postle opened an art studio in Boise, Idaho and was receiving attention as an interior decorator and artist. A journalist named Robert Blackstone came to interview her. They were married a year later on Dec. 6, 1928, and he became her manager.

== Travels in nature ==
Following their marriage, the couple travelled through the western United States in a home-made "flivver bungalow", a trailer that they dubbed the "Brownie House". They explored the country; Postle honed her art, accepted commissions and drew inspiration from the American landscape for her future work.

== Chronicler of the Florida environment ==
They arrived in Florida in 1934 and continued their nomadic life, camping, hiking and bird watching; these explorations gave Postle the opportunity of closely studying nature and refining her craft. In 1937, Postle was involved in the WPA Art Project. Three years later, Blackstone conceived the idea for their "Glamour Birds" act in which bird song, recorded by Blackstone, and music accompanied Postle as she painted birds and educated her audience. Postle and Blackstone eventually settled in a modest home and studio on Lake Rose at Orlo Vista near Gotha, Florida in 1942.

Postle counted many creative people in her circle of friends including the Chicago / Florida Prairie Style architect Hermann V. von Holst whose portrait she drew. "Joy told me once that she had performed for Carl Sandburg," her step-grandson Daren Kelly remembers. After her show, the famous poet approached her, took her hand in his huge one, and said, "I can see you’re a seeker. I'm a seeker too!"

Postle used Florida’s environment as the chief subject for art. She waded through swamps, climbed trees, endured bugs and stayed up all night" to observe her beloved birds and other wildlife. Postle maintained that "a painting must have movement. It's a dance performed with a brush and pigment on a stage of canvas. It should be spontaneous and joyous".

Postle was an effective and inspirational art teacher. As one student has said: "Joy Postle taught me to observe and draw from real life and then to escape into my own art and add design and a lot of me."

== Murals ==
Postle is best remembered for the murals that she created in commercial buildings and homes, adorning walls in Texas, North Carolina and Florida. In Beaumont, Texas, Postle created murals evoking Texas and Beaumont history in a hotel lobby. In North Carolina, she created four walls of murals for the Canton Area Historical Museum. In Florida, her murals graced the First National Bank of Stuart, the Fort Gatlin Hotel in Orlando, the San Carlos Hotel in Pensacola (1931, demolished 1993) and Casa Iberia at Rollins College in Winter Park, as well as many private residences, including "Rowallan" in Ormond Beach. At the age of eighty, Postle completed a mural at Orlando's Fashion Square Mall. Surviving murals by Postle continue to be identified and recorded in Central Florida.

== Later years ==
A fire at their home in 1968 killed Blackstone and badly injured Postle. After years of extensive surgery, she resumed her performances and exhibitions. She continued taking commissions for pet portraits, exhibiting her work, and selling paintings well into old age. In 1984, Postle broke her hip and moved into West Orange Manor Nursing Home; nevertheless she continued painting. Joy Postle died on June 1, 1989, and her ashes were spread at her home at Lake Rose in Florida.

== Publications ==
Postle published several books, including:

- Fine Feathers - 1941
- Glamour Birds of the Americas: Drawings and Poems - 1944
- Drawing Animals - 1953
- Drawing Birds - 1963
