= Rowallan =

Historic house in Florida, United States

- U.S. National Register of Historic Places
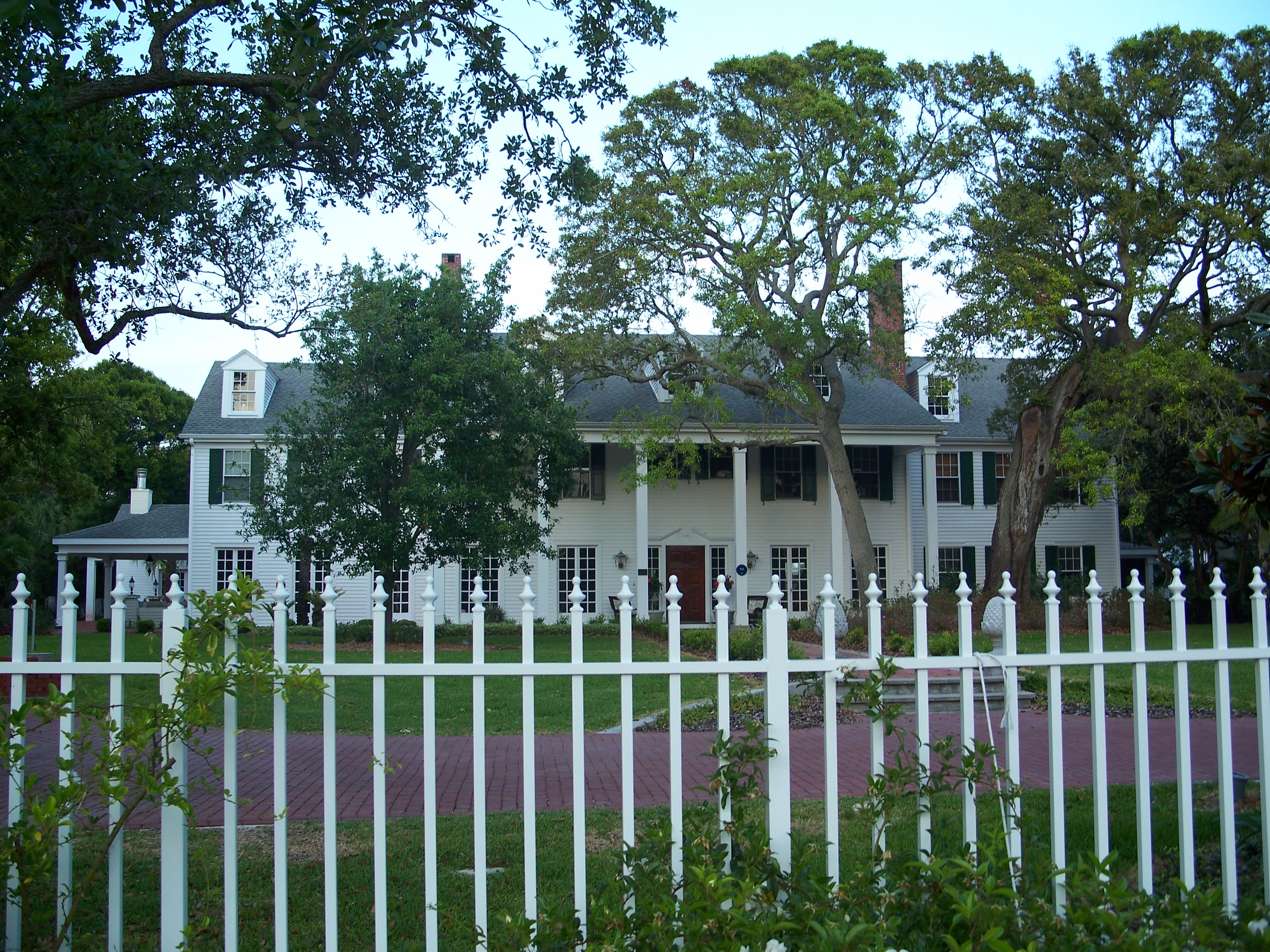

- Location within Volusia County
- Location: Ormond Beach, Florida
- Coordinates: 29°17′36″N 81°2′59″W
- Architectural style: Classical Revival
- MPS: Historic Winter Residences of Ormond Beach, 1878–1925 MPS
- NRHP reference No.: 88001724
- Added to NRHP: October 6, 1988

Rowallan is a historic house in Ormond Beach, Florida, United States, located at 253 John Anderson Highway. On October 6, 1988, it was added to the U.S. National Register of Historic Places.

== Origins ==
Rowallan was built in 1913 as the winter residence for Alexander Millar Lindsay (1841–1920). Born in Stewarton, Ayrshire, Scotland, the residence was named after a castle in his native Ayrshire.

Lindsay's daughter, Jean, designed Rowallan. Following Lindsay's death, the appraiser of Rowallan wrote: “Miss Lindsay would have it that she could walk out of the house without going down steps.” This of course led to problems with the water table. During certain times of the year, water would reach the lower part of the ground floor windows. Sills had to be replaced frequently because of this.

Also on the property was a cottage known as Sun Patch named for a favorite Lindsay granddaughter, Sunny Kame. It was the winter residence of Lindsay's eldest daughter, Harriet.

When Lindsay died in 1920, his widow erected a memorial fountain on the river side of the road. It was later destroyed by vandals. Rowallan served as the winter home for the entire extended Lindsay family.

== Later history ==
According to content about the Ormond Beach Historical Trail written by Orlando historian Steve Rajtar, Rowallen was later owned by Englishman Leonard Martin, and then Harold and Eileen Butts. The Butts renamed the house Linsaroe, which means "by the water" in Celtic. Eileen Butts was added to the state list of prominent Floridians for her work in the area including the creation of Tomoka State Park, the building of the Ormond Memorial Art Gallery and the preservation of John D. Rockefeller's Ormond Beach home The Casements. The plaque listing her as a great Floridian form the state's 2000 program is on the front of Rowallen.

== Joy Postle murals ==
Rowallan also features murals by the noted Florida artist, Joy Postle. Postle, a former WPA artist, is known for her paintings of Florida wildlife scenes and in particular birds. In addition, she was a published poet, author, musician and entertainer. She resided in Orlando, Florida.
