= Postles =

Postles is a surname. Notable people with the surname include:

- Alfred Postles (1903–1976), New Zealand cricketer
- Bryce Postles (1931–2011), New Zealand cricketer
- Charles Postles Jr., American politician
- James P. Postles (1840–1908), American soldier

== See also ==
- Postle (surname)
- Postles House
