= The Hammocks =

Historic house in Florida, United States

- U.S. National Register of Historic Places
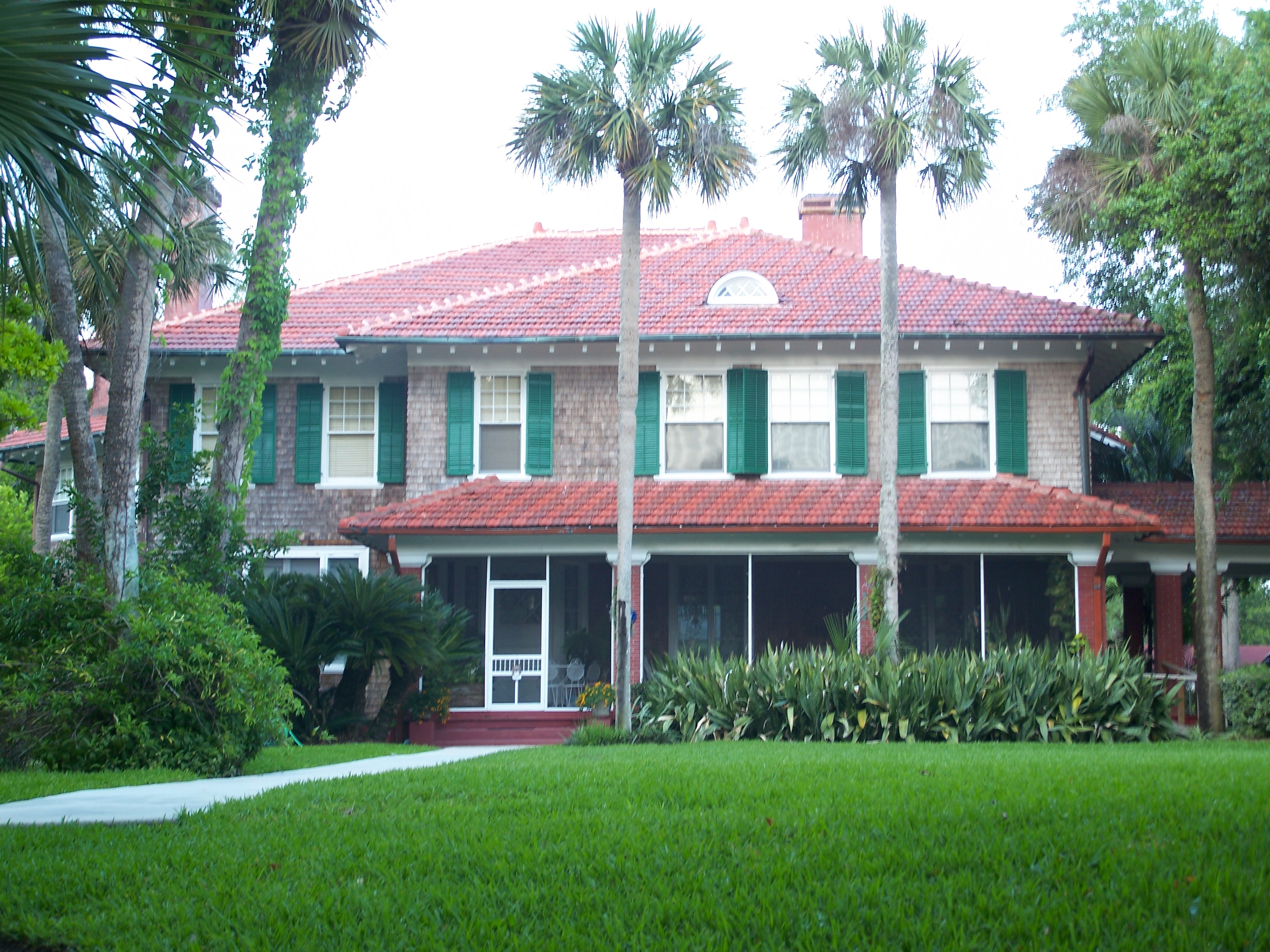

- Location within Volusia County
- Location: Ormond Beach, Florida
- Coordinates: 29°17′51″N 81°3′6″W
- Architectural style: Shingle Style
- MPS: Historic Winter Residences of Ormond Beach, 1878–1925 MPS
- NRHP reference No.: 88001719
- Added to NRHP: September 5, 1989

The Hammocks is a historic site in Ormond Beach, Florida, United States. It is located at 311 John Anderson Highway. On September 5, 1989, it was added to the U.S. National Register of Historic Places.
