= The Porches =

Historic house in Florida, United States

- U.S. National Register of Historic Places
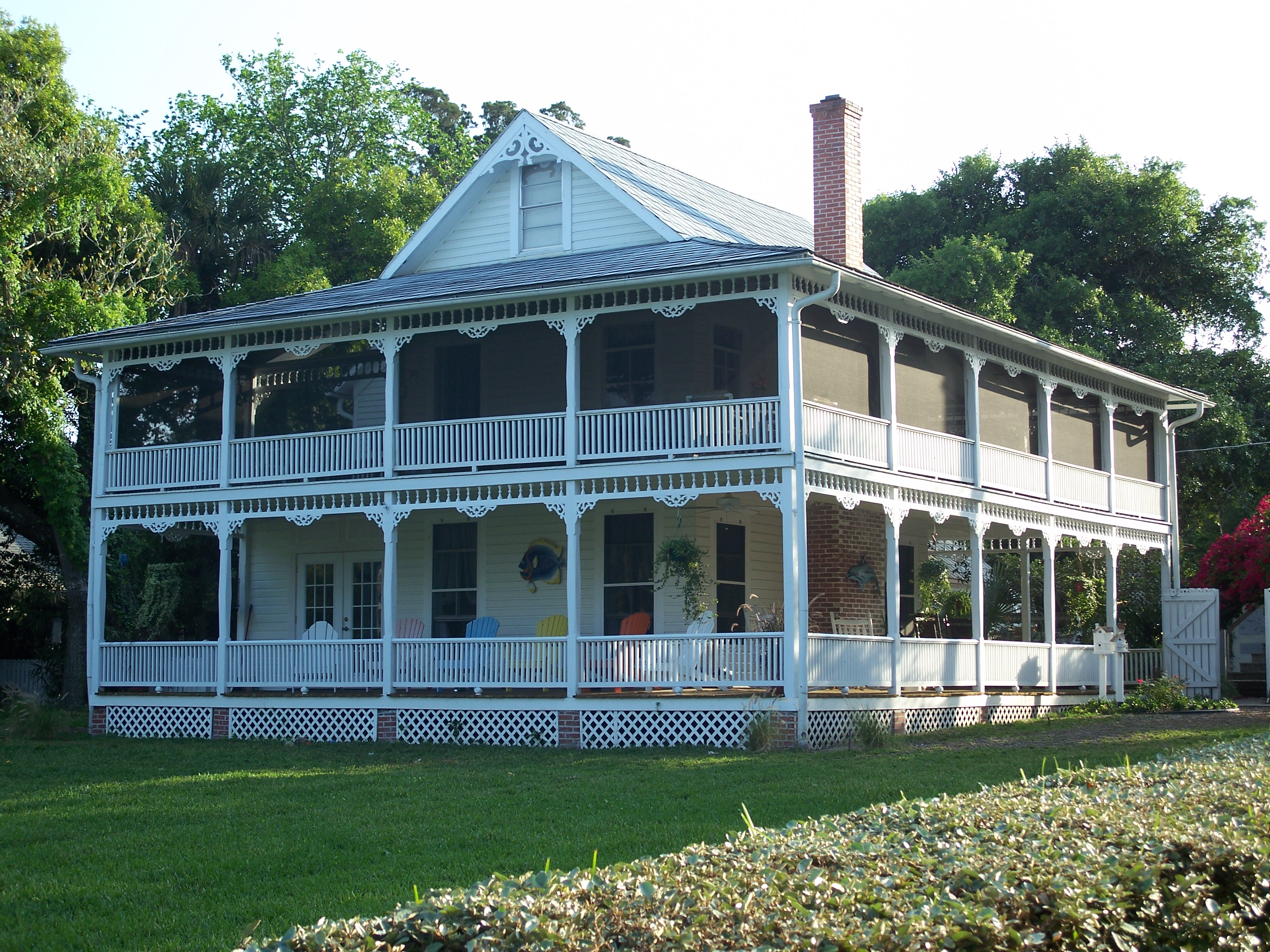

- Location within Volusia County
- Location: Ormond Beach, Florida
- Coordinates: 29°16′52″N 81°3′14″W
- Architectural style: Frame Vernacular
- MPS: Historic Winter Residences of Ormond Beach, 1878–1925 MPS
- NRHP reference No.: 88001715
- Added to NRHP: October 6, 1988

The Porches is a historic site in Ormond Beach, Florida, United States. It is located at 176 South Beach Street. On October 6, 1988, it was added to the U.S. National Register of Historic Places.

== Gallery ==
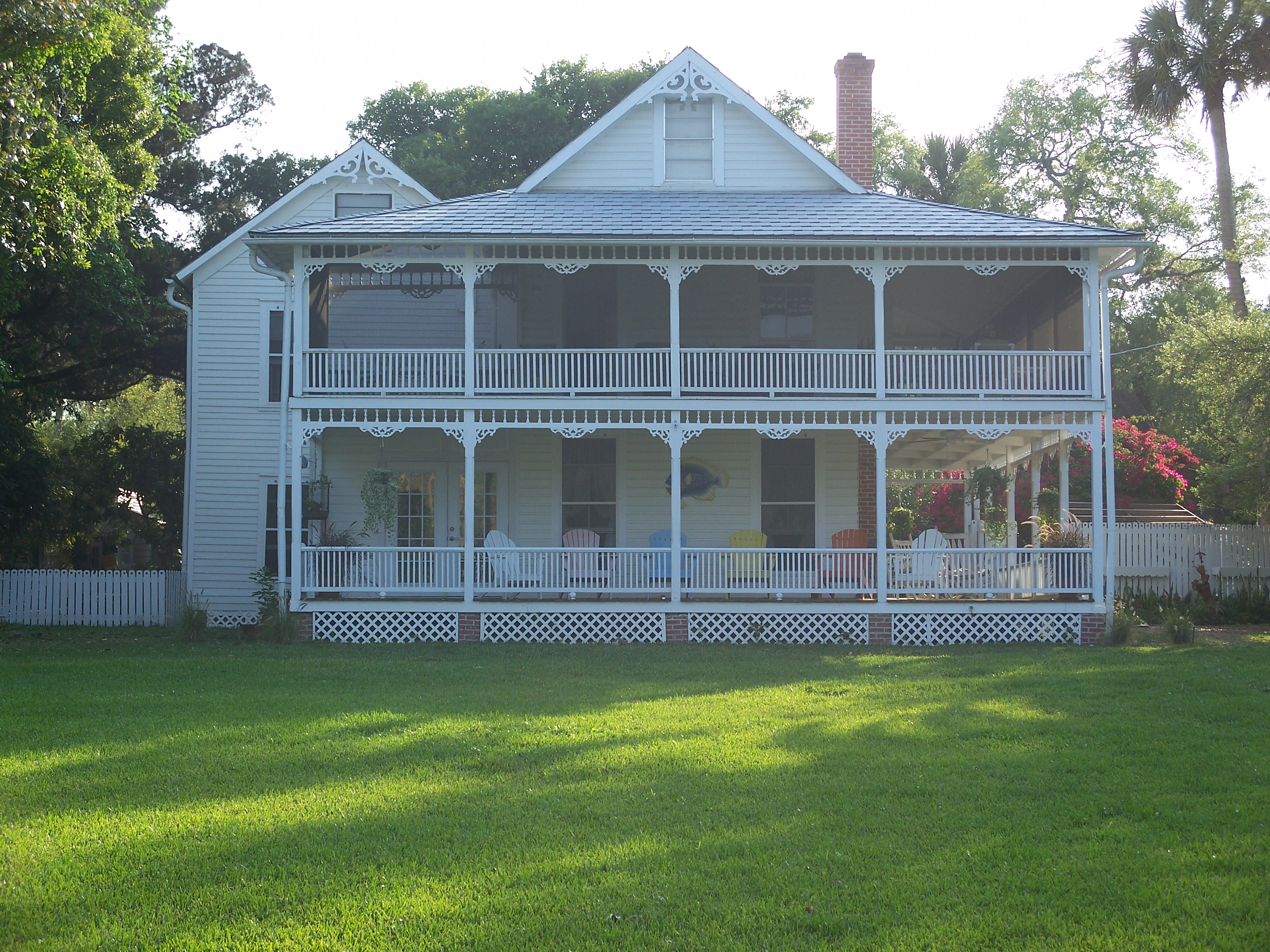

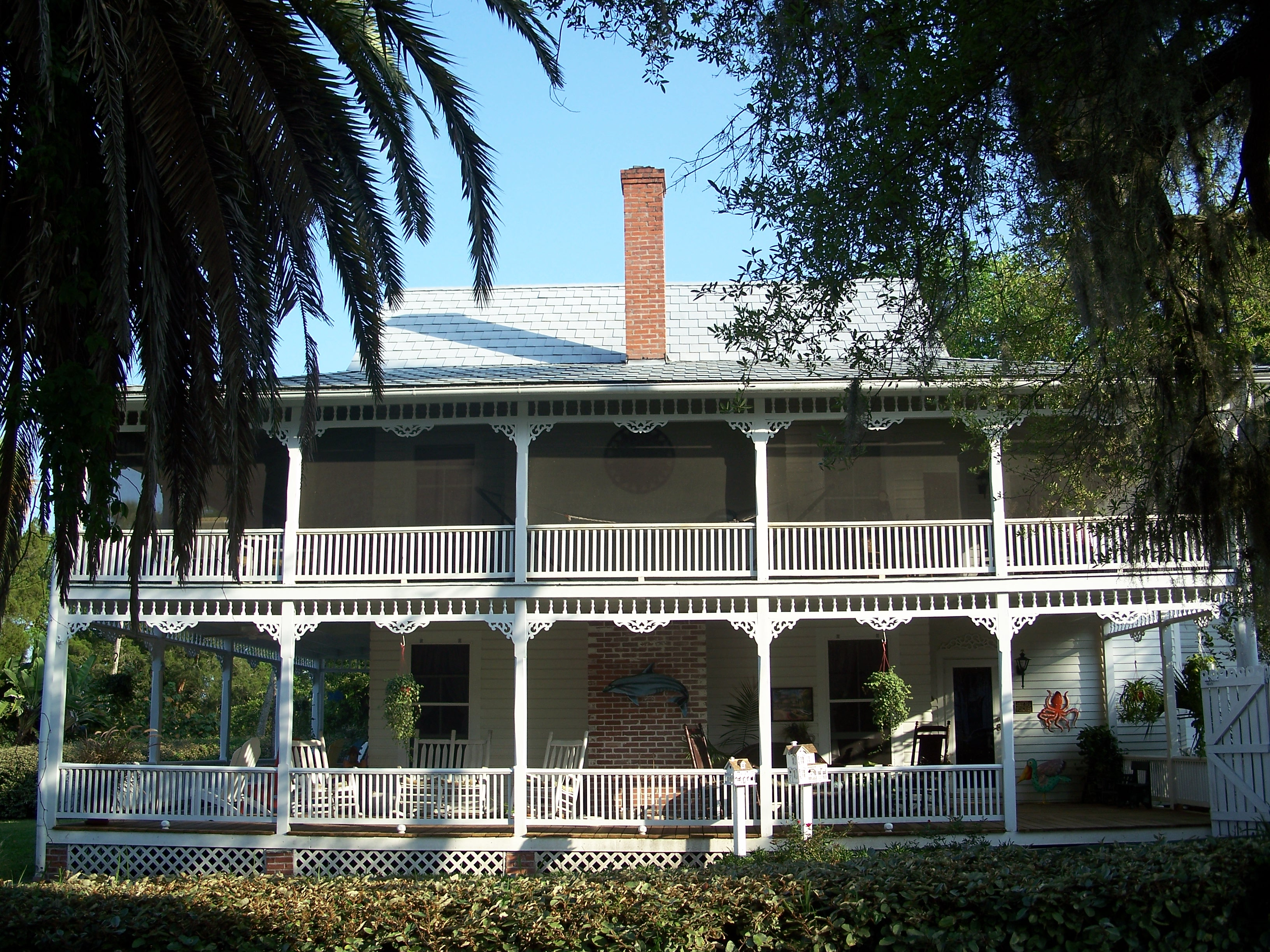
