= Talahloka =

Historic house in Florida, United States

- U.S. National Register of Historic Places
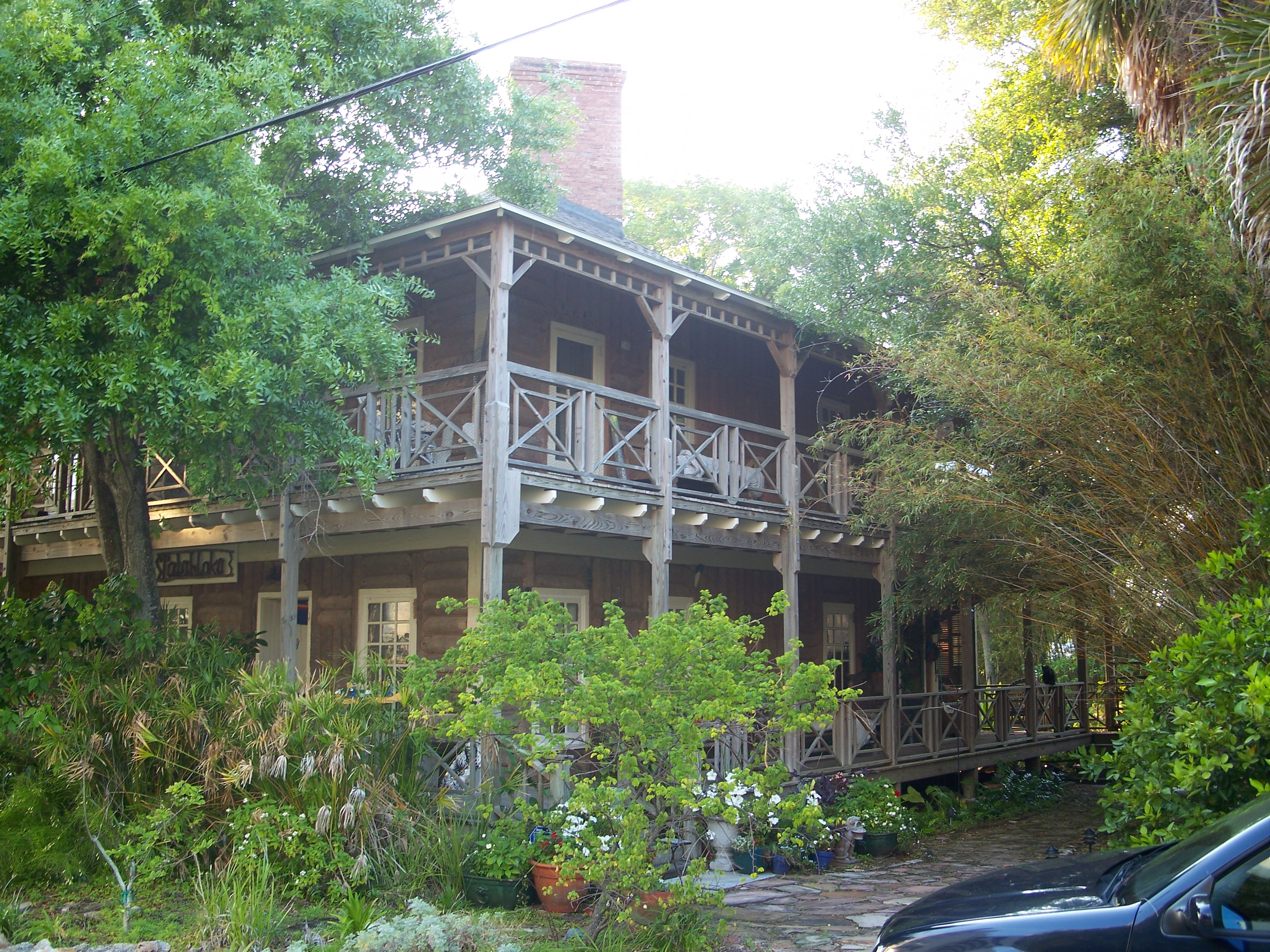

- Location within Volusia County
- Location: Ormond Beach, Florida
- Coordinates: 29°17′26″N 81°2′53″W
- Architectural style: Frame Vernacular
- MPS: Historic Winter Residences of Ormond Beach, 1878–1925 MPS
- NRHP reference No.: 88001716
- Added to NRHP: September 6, 1989

Talahloka is a historic site in Ormond Beach, Florida, United States. It is located at 19 Orchard Lane. On September 6, 1989, it was added to the U.S. National Register of Historic Places.
