= Historic Winter Residences of Ormond Beach, 1878–1925 MPS =

Historic houses in Florida, United States

- U.S. National Register of Historic Places
- Location within Volusia County
- Location: Ormond Beach, Florida
- Coordinates: 29°17′11″N 81°4′30″W
- MPS: Historic Winter Residences of Ormond Beach, 1878–1925 MPS
- NRHP reference No.: 64500109

The following buildings were added to the National Register of Historic Places as part of the Historic Winter Residences of Ormond Beach, 1878–1925 multiple property submission (MPS).

Resource Name	Also known as	Address	City	County	Added
John Anderson Lodge		71 Orchard Lane	Ormond Beach	Volusia County	September 6, 1989
Casements Annex		127 Riverside Drive	Ormond Beach	Volusia County	October 6, 1988
Dix House		178 North Beach Street	Ormond Beach	Volusia County	September 6, 1989
The Hammocks		311 John Anderson Highway	Ormond Beach	Volusia County	September 5, 1989
The Porches		176 South Beach Street	Ormond Beach	Volusia County	October 6, 1988
Rowallan		253 John Anderson Highway	Ormond Beach	Volusia County	October 6, 1988
Talahloka		19 Orchard Lane	Ormond Beach	Volusia County	September 6, 1989
