= St. Johns and Halifax Railway =

Former narrow-gauge railroad in Florida

The St. Johns and Halifax Railway was a 3 ft (914 mm) narrow gauge railroad incorporated on December 12, 1881, under the general incorporation laws of Florida. Its plan was to build a railroad from Rollestown in Putnam County on the St. Johns River, to a point on the Halifax River in Volusia County at or near New Britain (known as Ormond Beach today). The distance of the line was 51.99 miles, but 1.4 miles of the line was eventually abandoned. Florida state law chapter 3650, approved February 12, 1885, assigned it land grants.

On October 1, 1888, the property of the St. Johns and Halifax Railway was conveyed to the St. Johns & Halifax River Railway, which was incorporated a few days later on October 11, 1888. At some point after this and before 1893, the 3 ft (914 mm) narrow gauge line was converted to 4 ft 8 1/2 in (1,435 mm) standard gauge. On January 1, 1893, the line was acquired by the Florida East Coast Railway.
