= Elgin Public Museum =

Museum in Illinois, United States

- Elgin Public Museum before the east wing was added in 1998
- Established: 1907
- Location: 225 Grand Boulevard; Elgin, Illinois
- Coordinates: 42.0425°N 88.2622°W
- Type: Natural history, anthropology
- Website: www.elginpublicmuseum.org

The Elgin Public Museum of Natural History and Anthropology is a natural history museum located in Elgin, Illinois. The museum, now over a hundred years old, is located within the 108-acre Lords Park.

== Mission and Purpose ==
The museum's stated mission is to enhance knowledge of the natural sciences and anthropology through the use of exhibits and interactive experiences.

The museum's stated purpose is as follows: "To promote a comprehension and appreciation of both our natural world and other cultures, both past and present; and to increase our awareness of the consequences of the decisions human cultures have made through time."

== History ==
Built in 1907 as the Lord Memorial Museum and opened in 1920 as the Elgin Audubon Museum, it is the oldest museum building in Illinois still used as such. The collection was the gift of Mr. and Mrs. G. P. Lord, and was first exhibited in the Lords Park Pavilion in 1898. However, the Lords asked that their collection be housed in its own building, and local architect David E. Postle was contracted to design the building in 1904. The original plan for the museum called for three wings, but only the west wing and central hall were completed before funds ran out. The east wing was added in 1998, restoring the neo-classical symmetry of the building's original design, and was built to match the original structure, including the brick and oolithic limestone detailing. The museum's interior includes beautiful and original oak woodwork, plaster wall ornamentation and ceramic tile floors.

In July 2000, the museum reopened with several new features, including a handicapped accessible north entrance, elevator and public restrooms. New exhibits included Exploring the Waterways: The LaSalle Expedition, Nature of Elgin and a hands-on Children's Discovery Room. The Museum Store was expanded as well.

== Exhibits ==
Current exhibit topics include Mazon Creek fossils, Native American lifeways, Ice Age mammals, the Fox River ecosystem, the La Salle Expeditions, endangered species, rocks and minerals, and many mounts and natural history specimens featuring wildlife native to the Fox River Valley. The museum also features a Discovery Room, an interactive and educational playroom directed at children that includes games and puzzles as well as a hands-on collection with furs, turtle shells, and other natural history objects. A farm zoo, captive bison and elk, and other animals are on display in the surrounding 108-acre (0.44 km^{2}) Lords Park.

Past exhibitions include "A Shadow Over the Earth: The Life and Death of the Passenger Pigeon", which discusses the passenger pigeon and its eventual extinction. The exhibit was developed by the University of Michigan Museum of Natural History as a contribution to Project Passenger Pigeon, a commemoration of the 100th anniversary of the bird's extinction, and the exhibit featured an actual passenger pigeon specimen.

== Education ==
The museum offers classes for adults and children, as well as programs for schools and scouting groups. Topics include anthropology, ecology, geology and paleontology, and zoology, as well as seasonal events throughout the year.
