= Ormond Hotel =

- The Ormond Hotel
- Formerly listed on the U.S. National Register of Historic Places
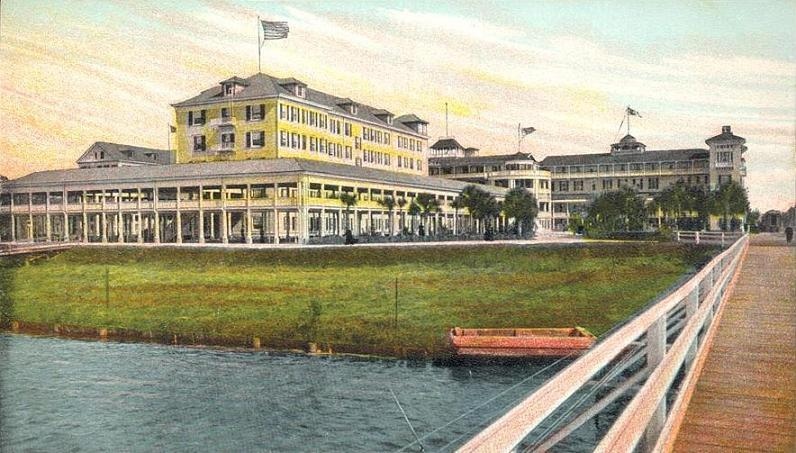

- Location within Volusia County
- Location: Ormond Beach, Florida, United States
- Coordinates: 29°17′20.59″N 81°2′50.28″W
- Architect: George Penfield
- NRHP reference No.: 80000964

Significant dates
- Added to NRHP: November 24, 1980
- Removed from NRHP: September 12, 2025

The Ormond Hotel (also known as The Flagler Hotel) was a historic hotel in Ormond Beach, Florida, United States. It was located at 15 East Granada Boulevard.

== History ==
Built by John Anderson and J. D. Price, the hotel opened on January 1, 1888. By spring of 1889, the Florida East Coast Railway extended its service from Jacksonville to Daytona, and railroad magnate Henry Flagler bought The Ormond Hotel and enlarged it to handle 600 guests. It became one in a series of his hotels positioned along the line to accommodate his passengers, including The Ponce De León Hotel in St. Augustine, The Royal Poinciana Hotel and The Breakers Hotel in Palm Beach, and The Royal Palm Hotel in Miami. In 1914, John D. Rockefeller arrived at The Ormond Hotel for the winter season, and rented an entire floor for his staff and himself. After four seasons at the hotel, he bought The Casements, a nearby estate also beside the Halifax River.

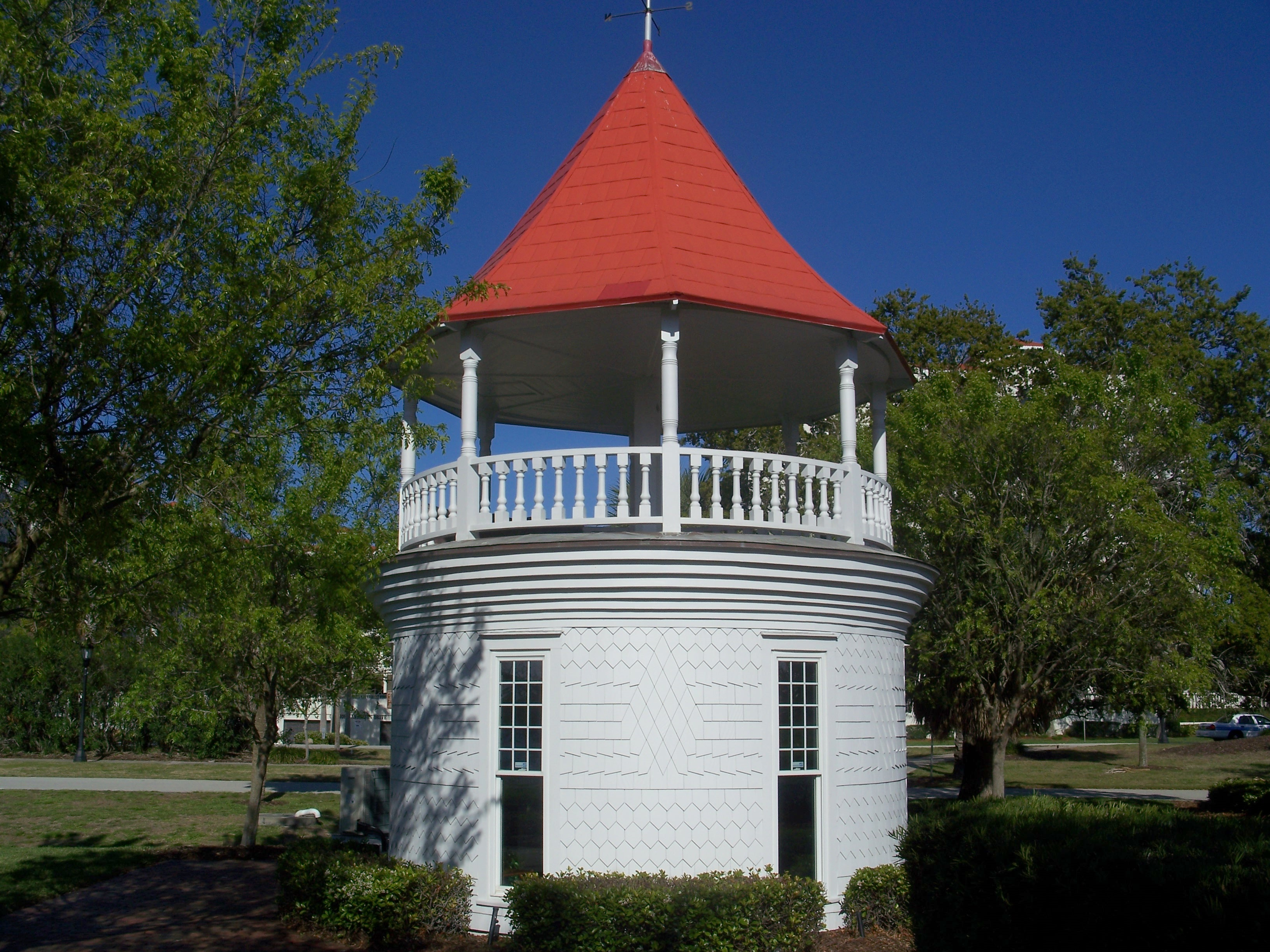
Original cupola

On November 24, 1980, The Ormond Hotel was added to the U.S. National Register of Historic Places. In 1992, the structure was razed to the ground to make way for a condominium. The original cupola now stands in Fortunato Park, directly west of the site of the former hotel.
