= Dix House =

Historic house in Florida, United States

- U.S. National Register of Historic Places
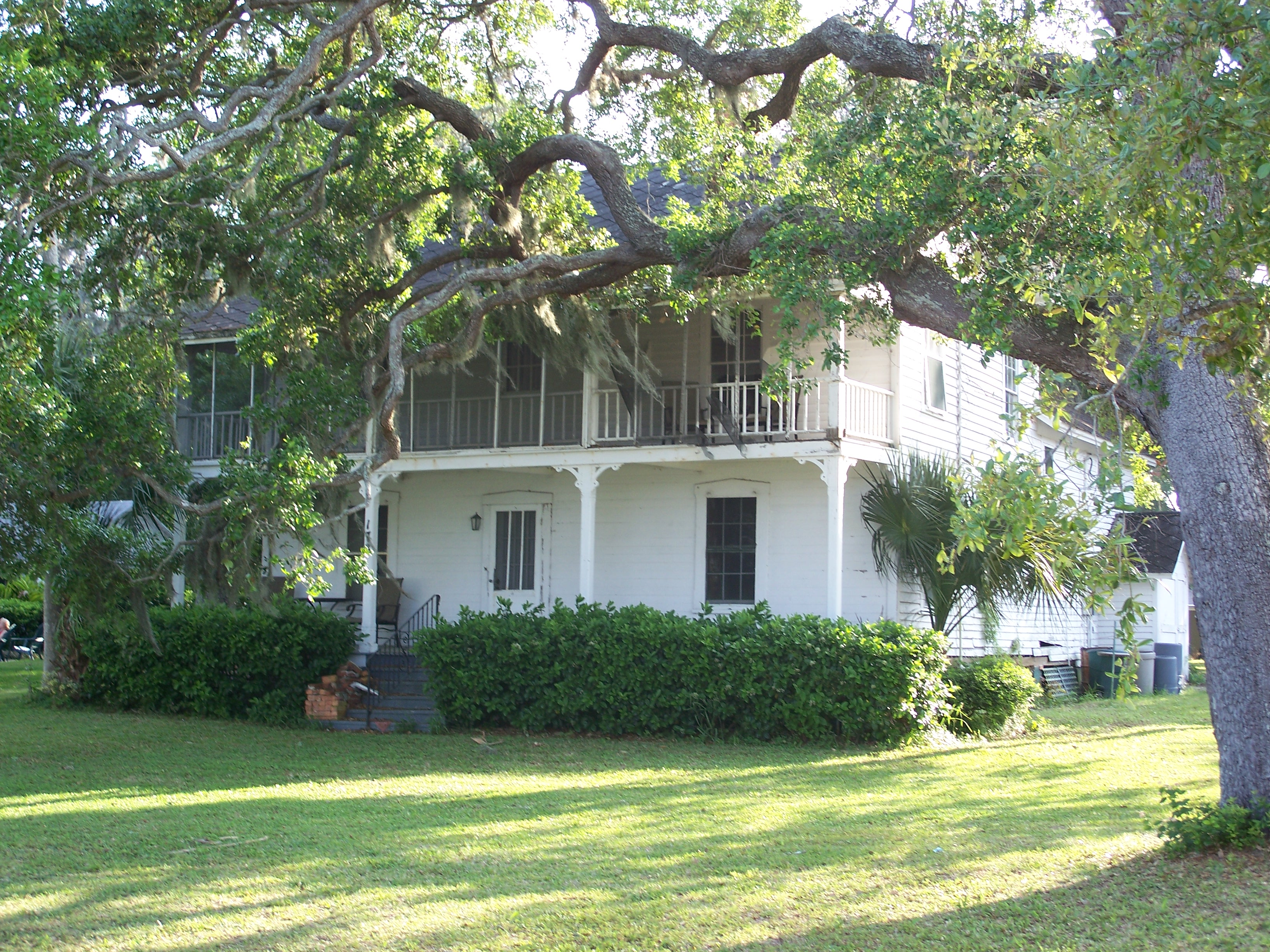

- Location within Volusia County
- Location: 178 North Beach Street, Ormond Beach, Florida
- Coordinates: 29°17′25″N 81°3′28″W
- Area: less than one acre
- Built: 1876
- Architectural style: Frame Vernacular, Unstyled
- MPS: Historic Winter Residences of Ormond Beach, 1878–1925 MPS
- NRHP reference No.: 88001721
- Added to NRHP: September 6, 1989

The Dix House is a historic home in Ormond Beach, Florida, United States. On September 6, 1989, it was added to the U.S. National Register of Historic Places.

The Dix house was originally built by Colonel Dix for his two sisters. The second floor of the Dix House was built open and used extensively for a wide variety of purposes including an early wedding hall and meeting place. The second floor of the Dix House was called, "Dix Hall" was the site that the colony of New Britain chose to become the City of Ormond on April 22, 1880.

More recently the Dix House suffered extensive damage in the hurricanes that visited the area in 2004. In 2007–2008, the home was extensively renovated under the guidance of the historical society to create a period accurate home, with modern amenities. It now has five bedrooms (each with a private bath) and an elevator. The home was purchased in 2016 by Chobee and Becky Ebbets, long time residents of Ormond Beach.
