= Alfred Postles =

New Zealand cricketer

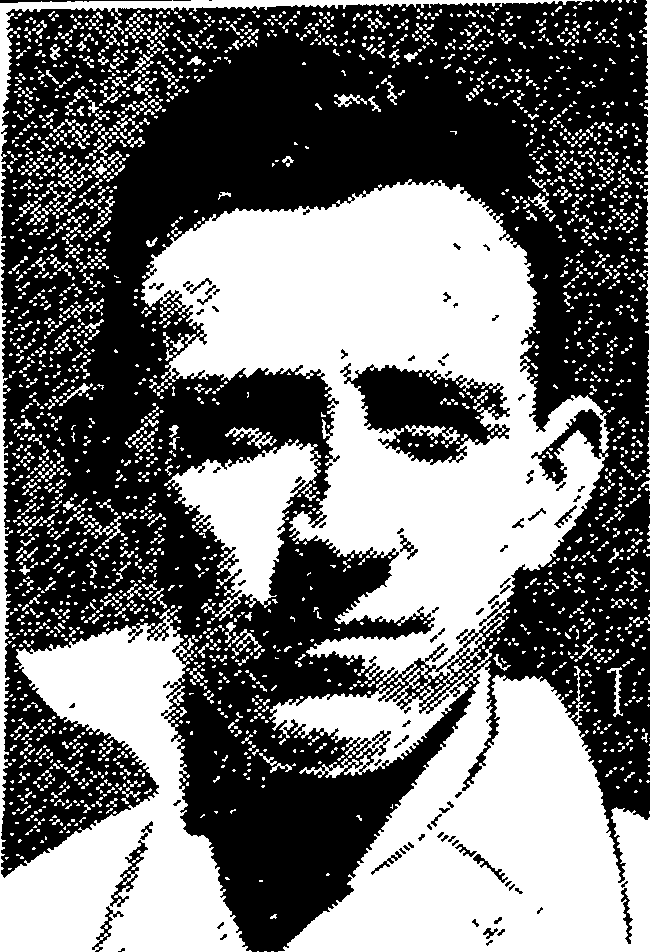
- Alf Postles in 1936

Personal information
- Full name: Alfred John Postles
- Born: 16 June 1903; Devonport, Auckland, New Zealand
- Died: 11 August 1976 (aged 73); Auckland, New Zealand
- Batting: Right-handed
- Bowling: Right-arm off-spin
- Relatives: Bryce Postles (son)

Domestic team information
- Years: Team
- 1924/25–1942/43: Auckland

Career statistics
Competition	First-class
Matches	31
Runs scored	1,588
Batting average	29.96
100s/50s	3/7
Top score	103
Balls bowled	794
Wickets	8
Bowling average	45.37
5 wickets in innings	0
10 wickets in match	0
Best bowling	4/20
Catches/stumpings	18/–
- Source: ESPNcricinfo, 25 May 2019

Alfred Postles (16 June 1903 – 11 August 1976) was a New Zealand cricketer. He played 31 first-class matches for Auckland between 1924 and 1943.

Alf Postles was a batsman and occasional off-spin bowler who captained Auckland for three seasons, in each of which they won the Plunket Shield: 1933–34, 1937–38 and 1938–39. His best match was against Canterbury in the 1937-38 Plunket Shield, when he made his highest score, 103, and took his best figures, 4 for 20, and Auckland beat Canterbury by an innings and 193 runs. He later served as president of the Auckland Cricket Association and of the New Zealand Cricket Council.

Postles was educated at Auckland Grammar School. He married Marjorie Jeffries in Auckland on 27 January 1930. He served as a lieutenant in the New Zealand Army during World War II, stationed in New Zealand.

His son Bryce played for Auckland in the 1950s.
