= Pattington Apartments =

- The Pattington
- U.S. National Register of Historic Places
- U.S. Historic district
- Chicago Landmark
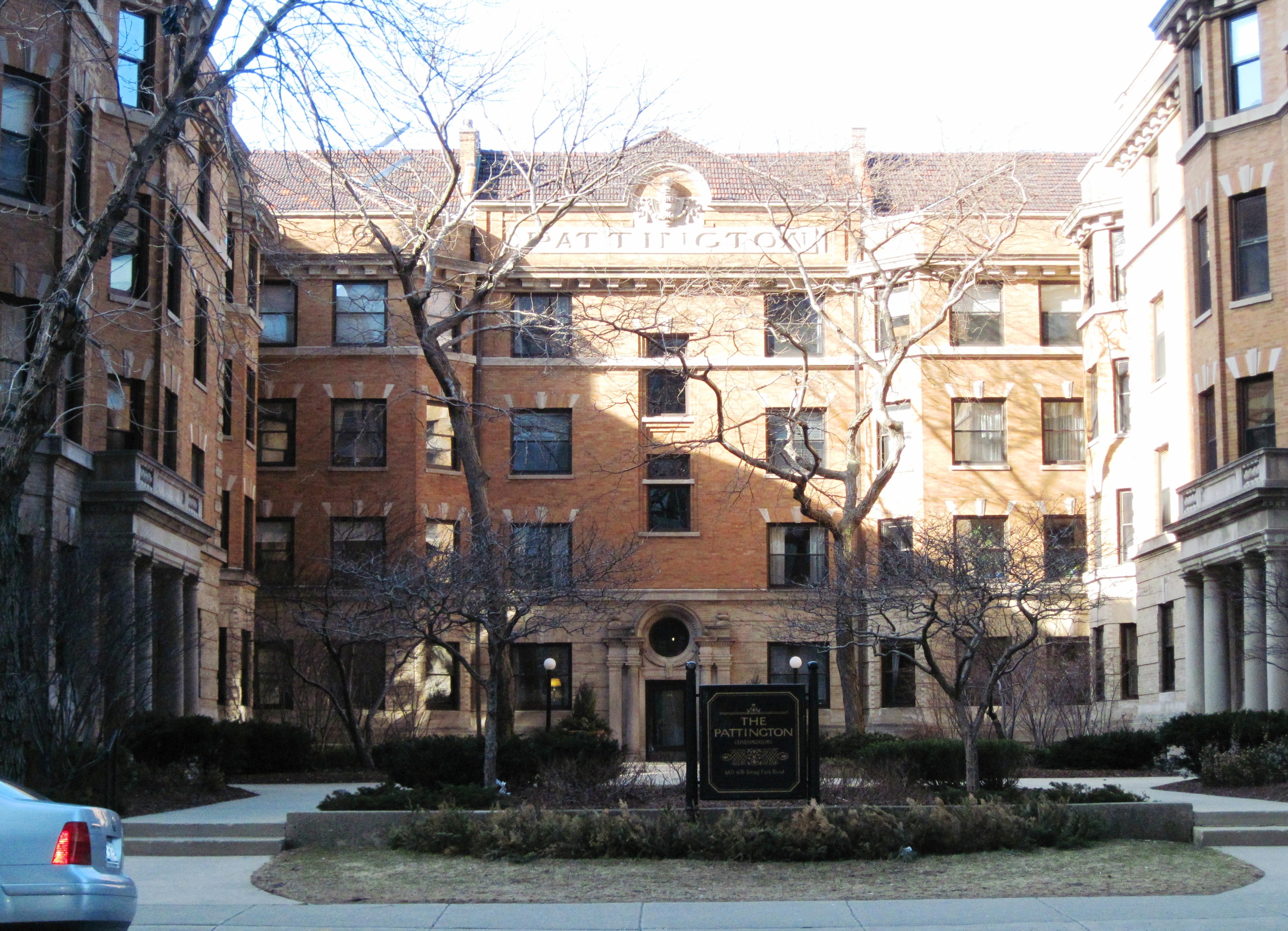
- One of the courtyards to the apartments, March 2010

- Location within Chicago metropolitan area Location within Illinois Location within the United States
- Location: 660--700 Irving Park Road; Chicago, Illinois; United States
- Coordinates: 41°57′17″N 87°38′54″W
- Area: 2.6 acres (1.1 ha)
- Built: 1902
- Architect: David E. Postle
- Website: www.the-pattington.com
- NRHP reference No.: 80001349
- Added to NRHP: March 8, 1980

The Pattington is a complex of 72 apartments in the Uptown neighborhood of Chicago, Illinois, United States. It is listed on the National Register of Historic Places.

== Description ==
At the date of construction in 1902, the building was the largest apartment complex in Chicago. The building is built with bay windows in a courtyard style.

The building was designed by architect David E. Postle and was added to the National Register of Historic Places March 8, 1980. The Pattington annex was designed by Andrew Sandegren.

== See also ==
- National Register of Historic Places listings in North Side Chicago
