= Bryce Postles =

New Zealand cricketer

Personal information
- Full name: Bryce John Postles
- Born: 22 February 1931; Auckland, New Zealand
- Died: 19 January 2011 (aged 79); Auckland, New Zealand
- Batting: Right-handed
- Role: Batsman
- Relatives: Alf Postles (father)

Domestic team information
- Years: Team
- 1952/53–1956/57: Auckland

Career statistics
Competition	First-class
Matches	19
Runs scored	770
Batting average	22.64
100s/50s	0/5
Top score	80
Catches/stumpings	7/–
- Source: Cricinfo, 28 June 2025

Bryce John Postles (22 February 1931 – 19 January 2011) was a New Zealand cricketer. He played 19 first-class matches for Auckland between 1952 and 1957. His father played for Auckland in the 1920s and 1930s.

Born in Auckland, Postles attended Auckland Grammar School. After his debut first-class season in 1952–53, The Cricket Almanack of New Zealand described him thus: "Very promising right-hand aggressive batsman with full range of strokes." In the first innings of his second match, on New Year's Day 1953, he scored 80, "a splendid exhibition of powerful stroke play", but that remained his highest score, and he played no first-class cricket after the 1956–57 season.
