= David E. Postle =

American architect

- Born: 1863
- Died: 1939 (aged 75–76)
- Occupation: Architect
- Buildings: Pattington Apartments; Elgin Public Museum; Downey-Farrell Company Factory; Self Help Graphics & Art building

David Elmer Postle Sr. (1863–1939) was an architect primarily known for his designs in the Chicago metropolitan area.

Postle was born in 1863 on a farm in Ohio. He moved to Illinois to study architecture and engineering at the University of Illinois. The first building he designed was a house in Elgin, Illinois in 1892, which was built for George Richardson, the superintendent of David C. Cook Publishing. He married Richardson's daughter, Georgia, on October 24, 1893, and moved into the Richardsons' home. Postle and his wife moved into another house he designed in Elgin in 1903. Postle designed many buildings in Elgin, including Lords Park Pavilion and the Elgin Public Museum, both local historic landmarks, as well as the David C. Cook Publishing Building, the old Elgin High School, the Masonic Temple, and dozens of homes.

Postle designed the Pattington Apartments in Chicago in 1902, which was placed on the National Register of Historic Places in 1980. He went on to design many other courtyard-style apartment buildings in Chicago. Postle later partnered with John Baptiste Fischer, and designed an addition to the Downey-Farrell Company factory building in Chicago in 1917, and additions to the Elgin Watch Company factory in 1920.

In 1921, Postle moved to Los Angeles, and partnered with his son, David E. Postle Jr. He designed many buildings in Los Angeles County in the 1920s, including the Self Help Graphics & Art building, utilizing the popular revival styles of the era.
