= The Casements =

Historic house in Florida, United States

- The Casements and Casements Annex
- U.S. National Register of Historic Places
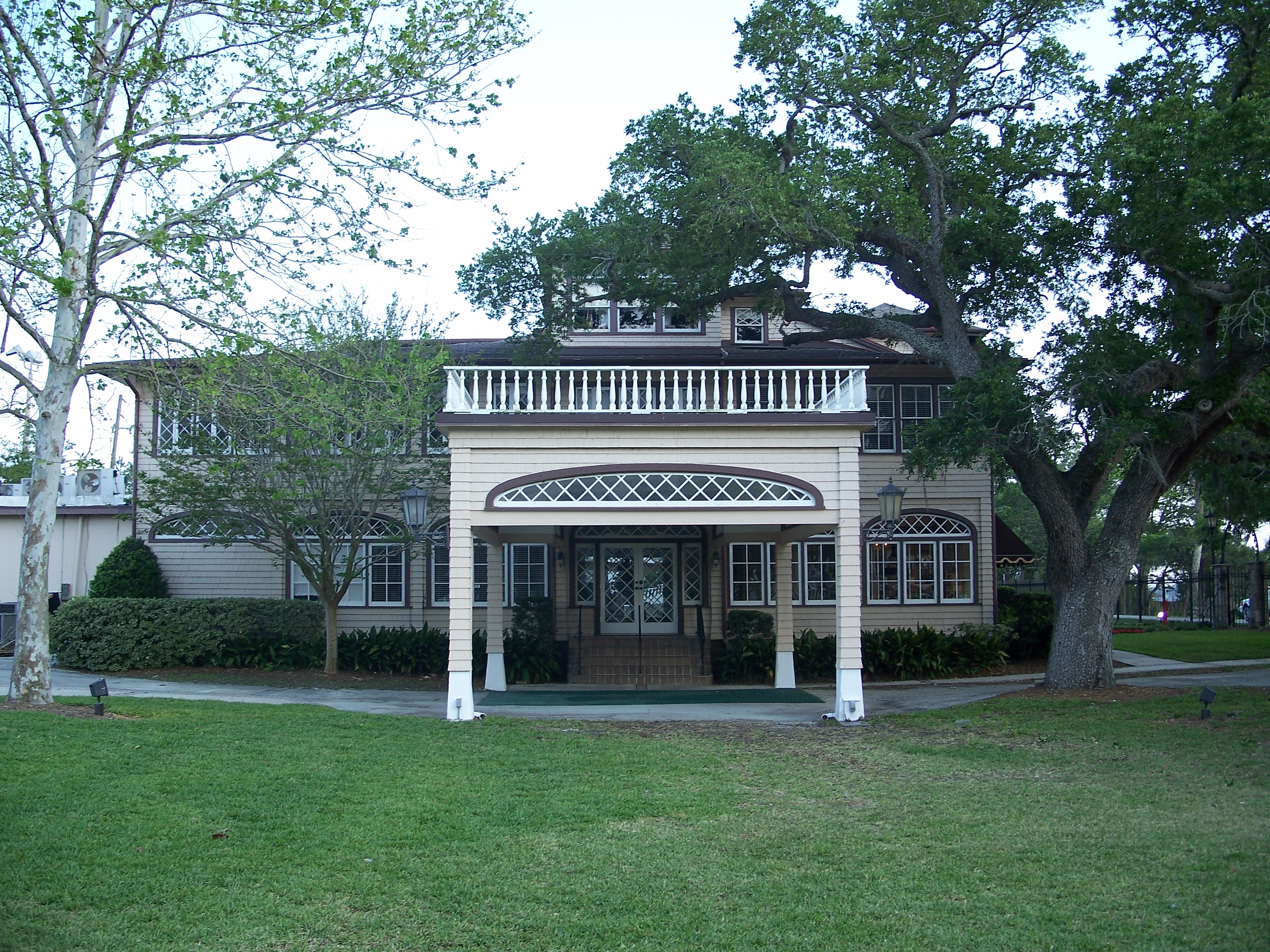

- Location within Volusia County
- Location: Ormond Beach, Florida
- Coordinates: 29°17′21″N 81°2′45″W
- Built: 1913
- Architectural style: Shingle Style
- MPS: Historic Winter Residences of Ormond Beach, 1878–1925 MPS
- NRHP reference No.: 72001536 (The Casements); 88001720 (Casements Annex)
- Added to NRHP: June 30, 1972 (The Casements); October 6, 1988 (Casements Annex)

The Casements is a mansion in Ormond Beach, Florida, U.S., famous for being the winter residence of American oil magnate John D. Rockefeller. It is currently owned by the city of Ormond Beach and is used as a cultural center and park. It is located on a barrier island within the city limits, overlooking the Halifax River, which is now part of the Florida Intracoastal Waterway.

== History ==
The mansion was built in 1913 for the Reverend Dr. Harwood Huntington of New Haven, Connecticut. It was named for the many casement windows incorporated into the design of the building, which helped keep the interior cool in spite of Florida's subtropical climate.

=== The Rockefeller era ===
Its most famous resident, John D. Rockefeller, purchased the home as his winter residence in 1918. Rockefeller was seventy-eight years old when he moved into the Casements. He became known in the area for his elaborate Christmas parties, his love of golf, and for handing out dimes to his neighbors or visitors. During a golf game with Harvey Firestone, the tire magnate made such a good shot that Rockefeller decided he deserved a dime and handed one to his somewhat embarrassed guest.

Over the years, Edward VIII, Henry Ford, and Will Rogers visited Rockefeller at The Casements; Rogers once quipped, "I’m glad you won (at golf) today, Mr. Rockefeller. The last time you lost, the price of gasoline went up!"

Guests at The Casements received a poem along with their new dime. This poem is believed to have been written by Rockefeller:

I was early taught to work as well as play
My life has been one long, happy holiday
Full of work and full of play
I dropped the worry on the way
And God was good to me every day.

It was in this home that Rockefeller eventually died in his sleep on the morning of May 23, 1937. The Rockefeller family sold The Casements in 1939.

=== Later history ===
Maud van Woy purchase The Casements on November 8, 1940 to establish Casements Junior College and Preparatory School. In December 1942, van Woy was sued for failure to meet a $10,000 promissory note for The Casements property, triggering a clause that required her to pay the $30,000 loan balance in full ($591,141 in today's money). She solved her financial problems by closing another school she owned in Washington, D.C. and moving its students to Casements Junior College.

Over the next 20 years, The Casements served as a girls' preparatory school and a home for the elderly. In 1959 the property was purchased by the Hotel Ormond Corporation with plans for development, but those plans never materialized. In 1973, The Casements was placed on the National Register of Historic Places. The next year, it was purchased for $500,000 by the City of Ormond Beach, which eventually restored it until October 1979 to serve as a cultural and community center.

In 2009, The Casements underwent a $1.1 million renovation project.

== The gardens ==
The Casements gardens are an authentic restoration of a two-acre garden along the Halifax riverfront that belonged to John D. Rockefeller Sr. in the early 1900s. The gardens feature citrus trees, a grand promenade, streams and small bridges and a variety of seasonal flower displays during the year.

== Gallery ==
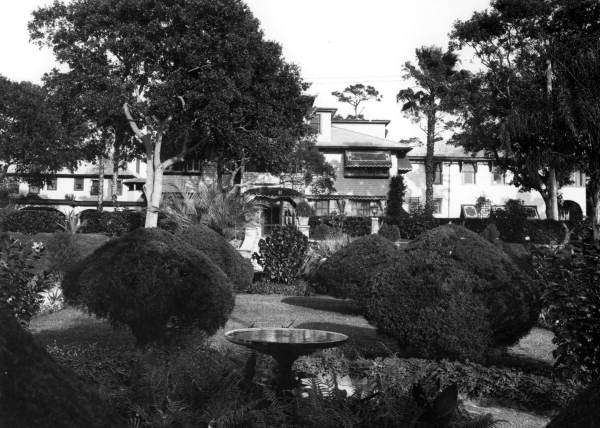
The Casements in Rockefeller's day

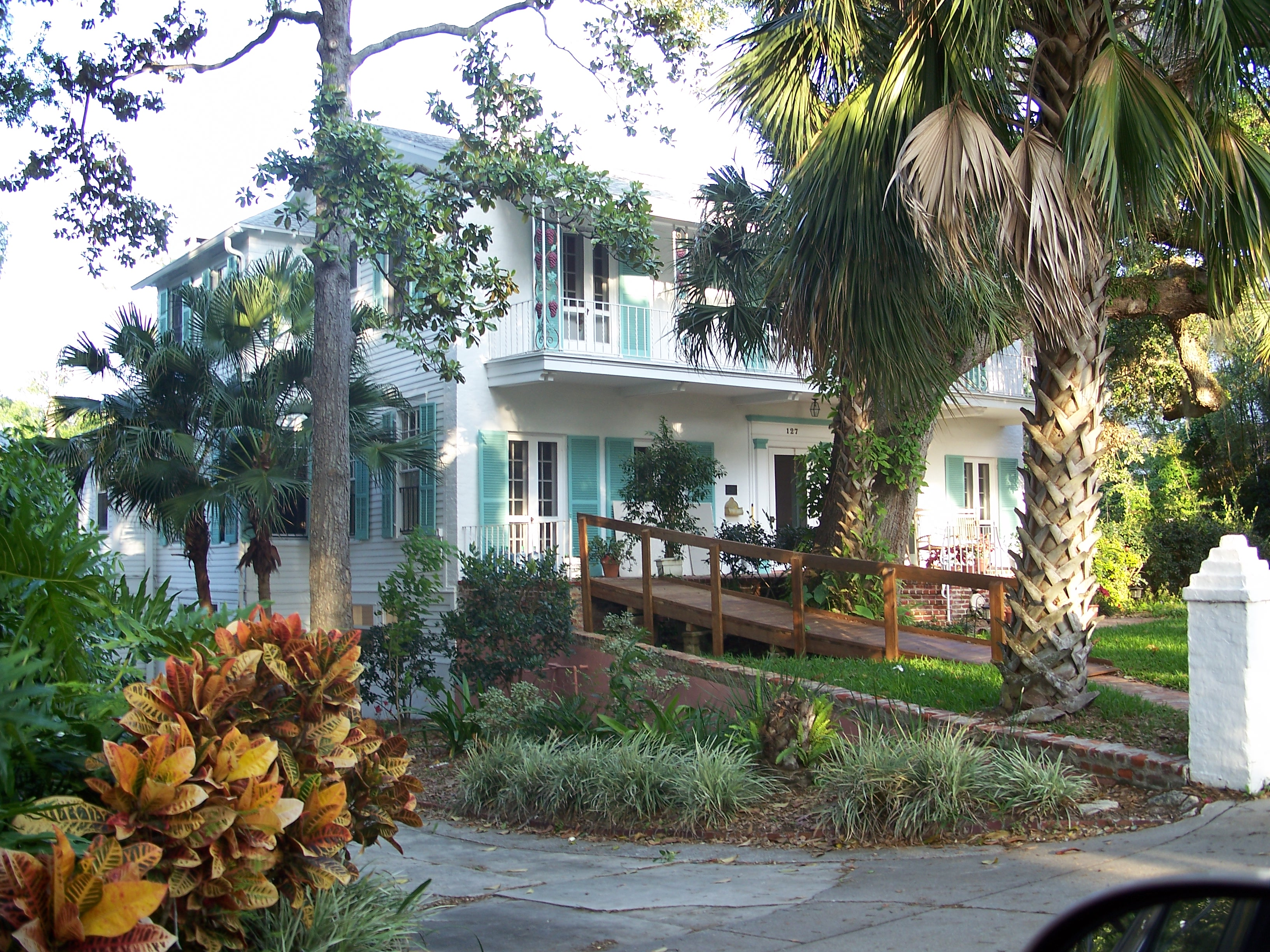
Casements Annex

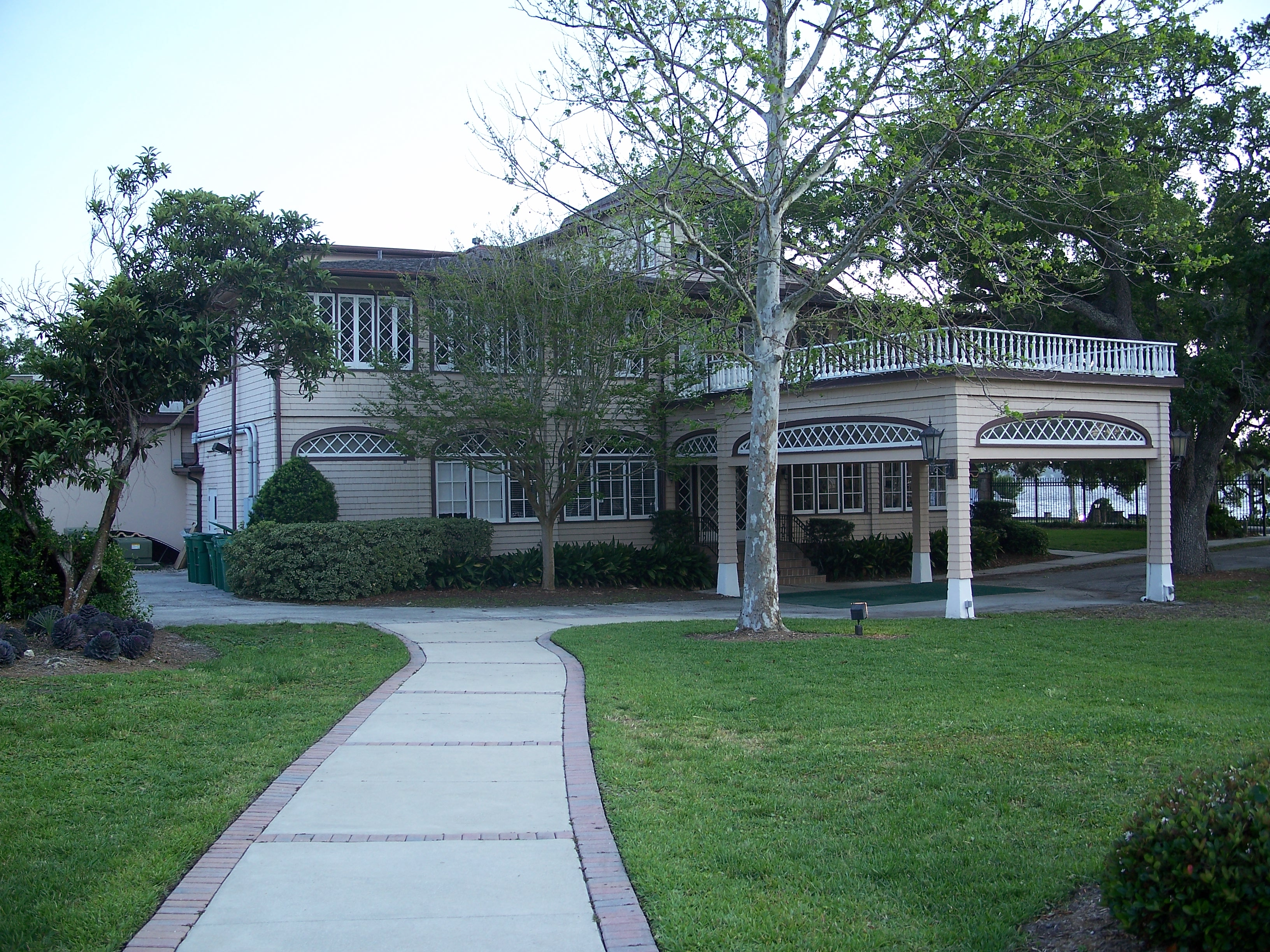
The Casements

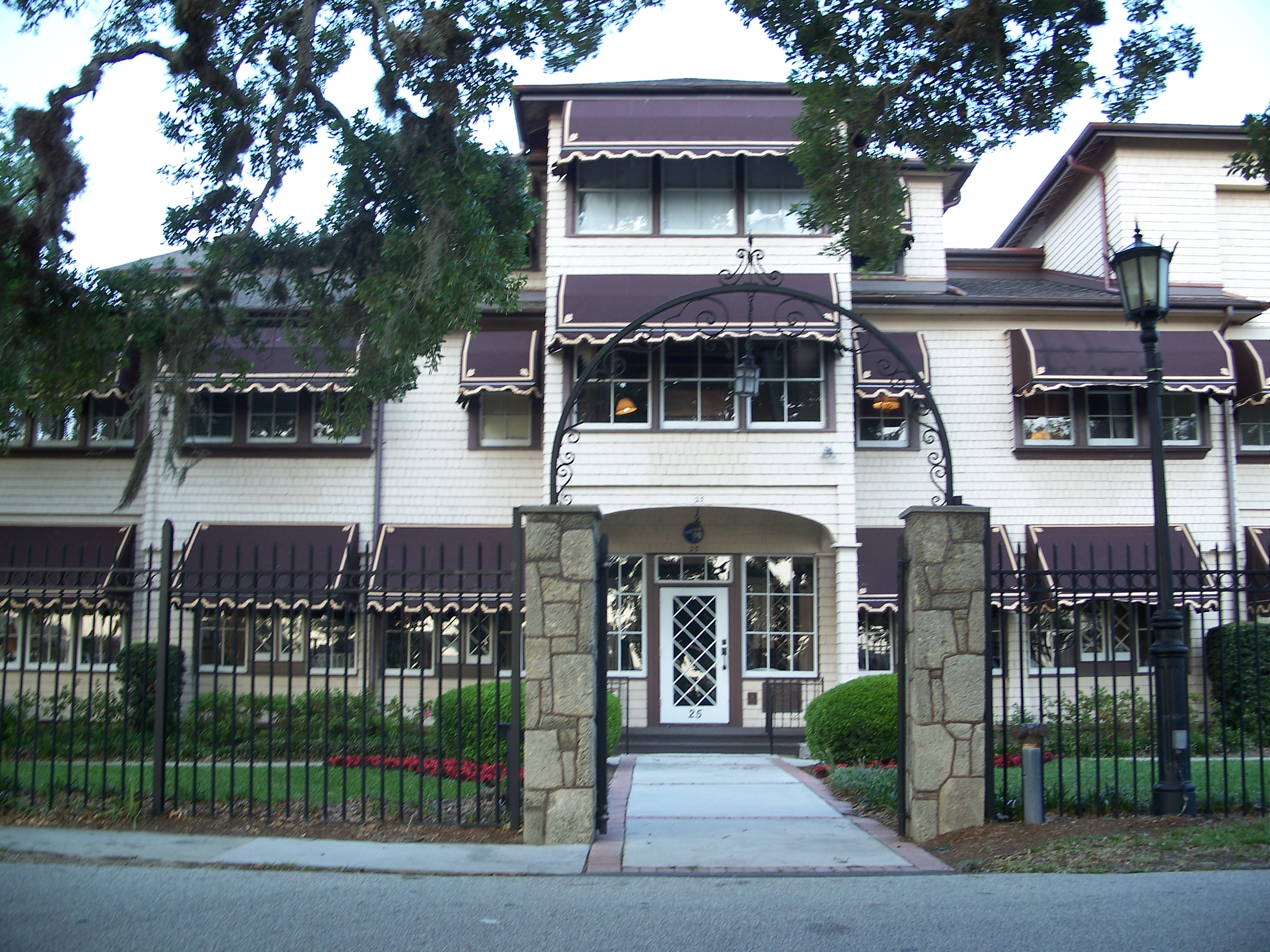
The Casements

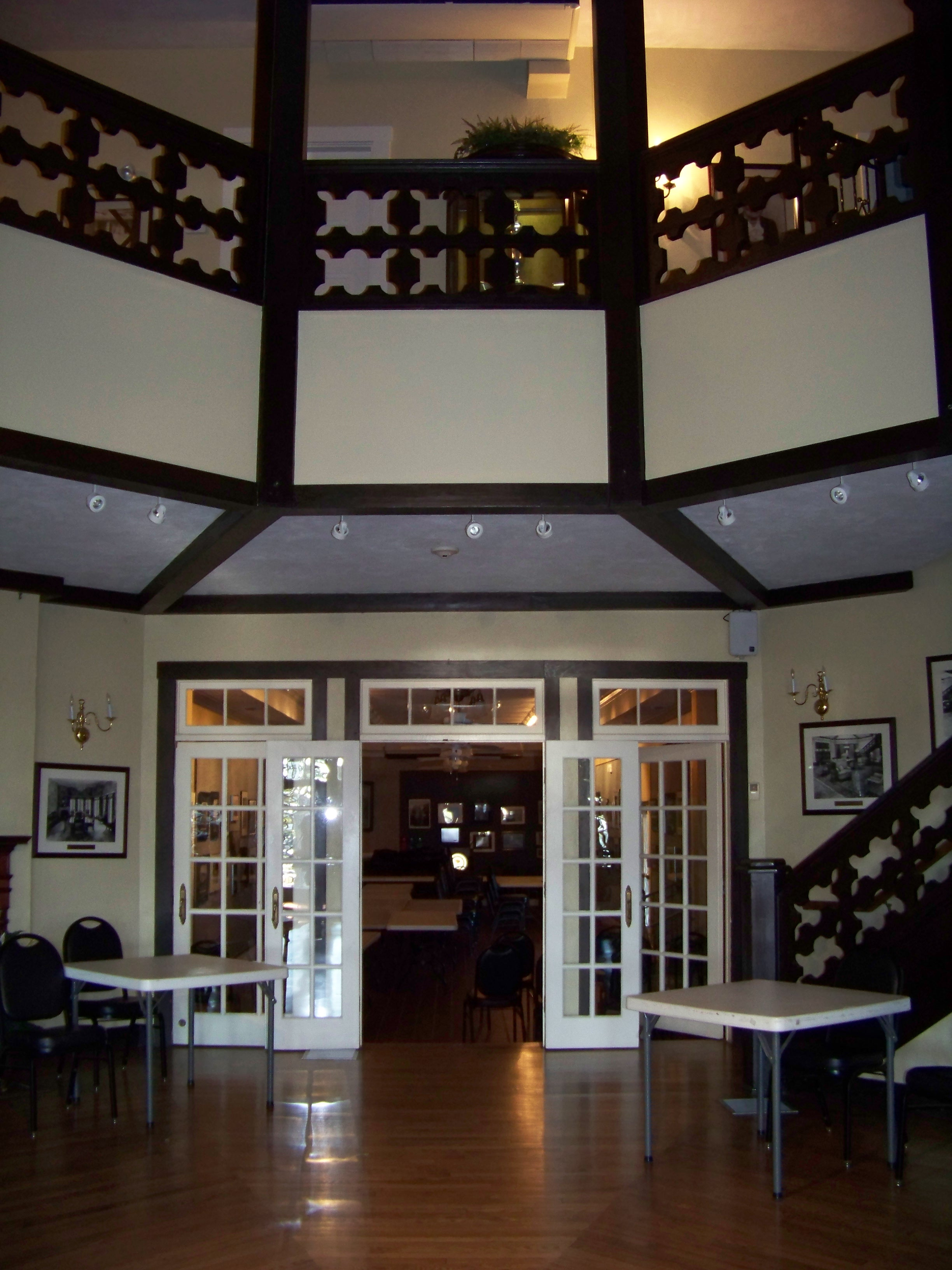
Central living room

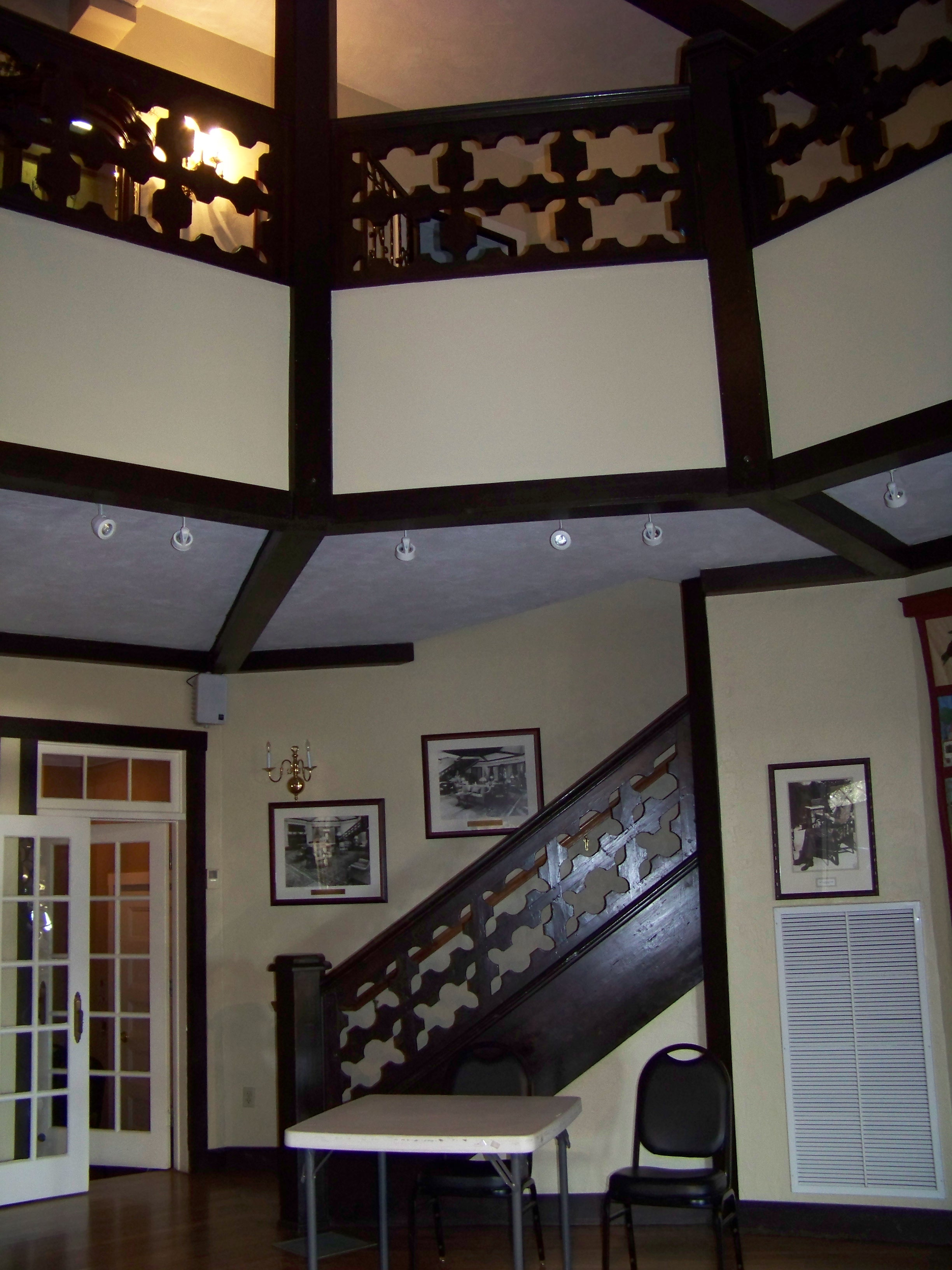
Stairway to second level

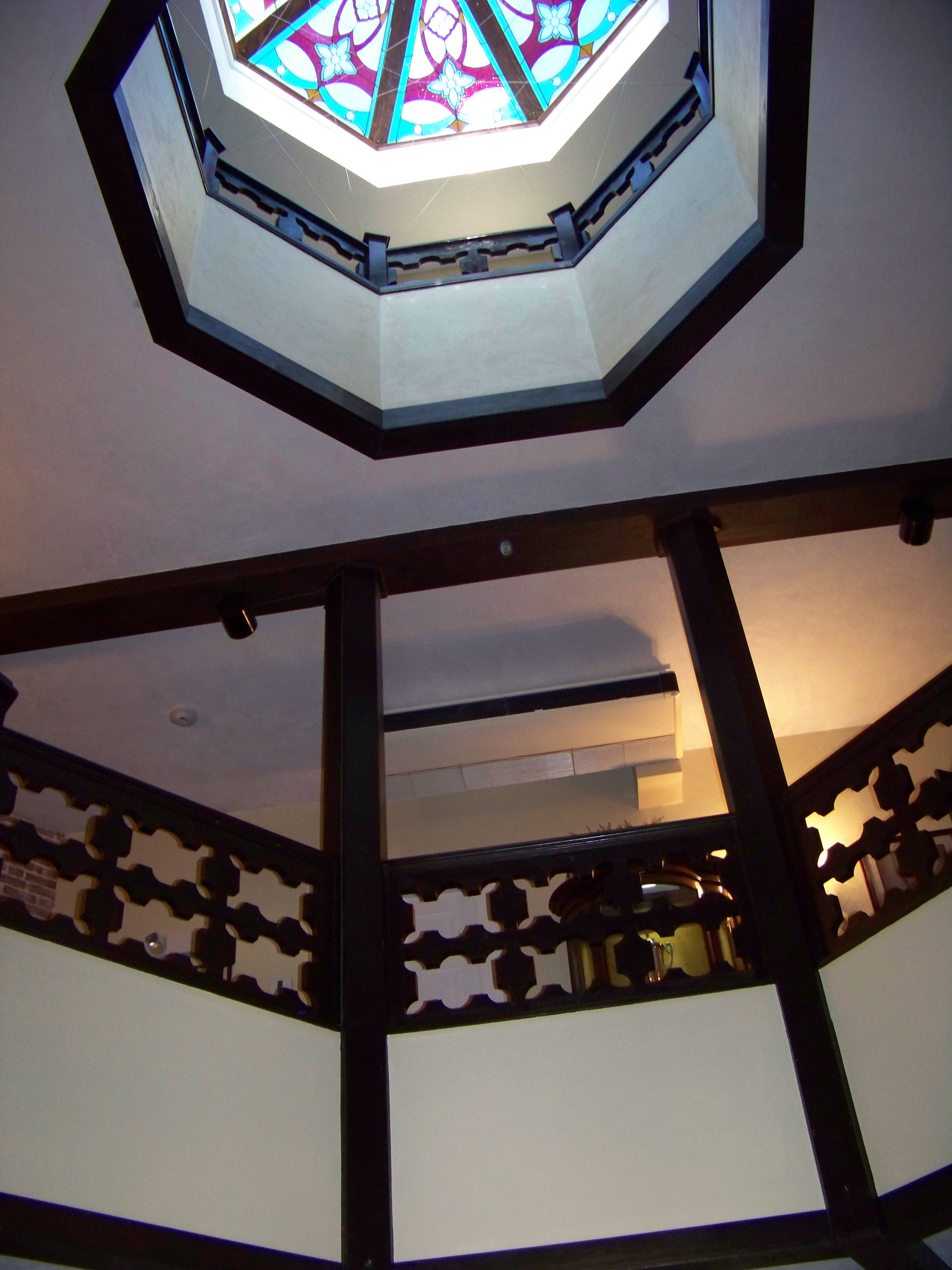
Third level

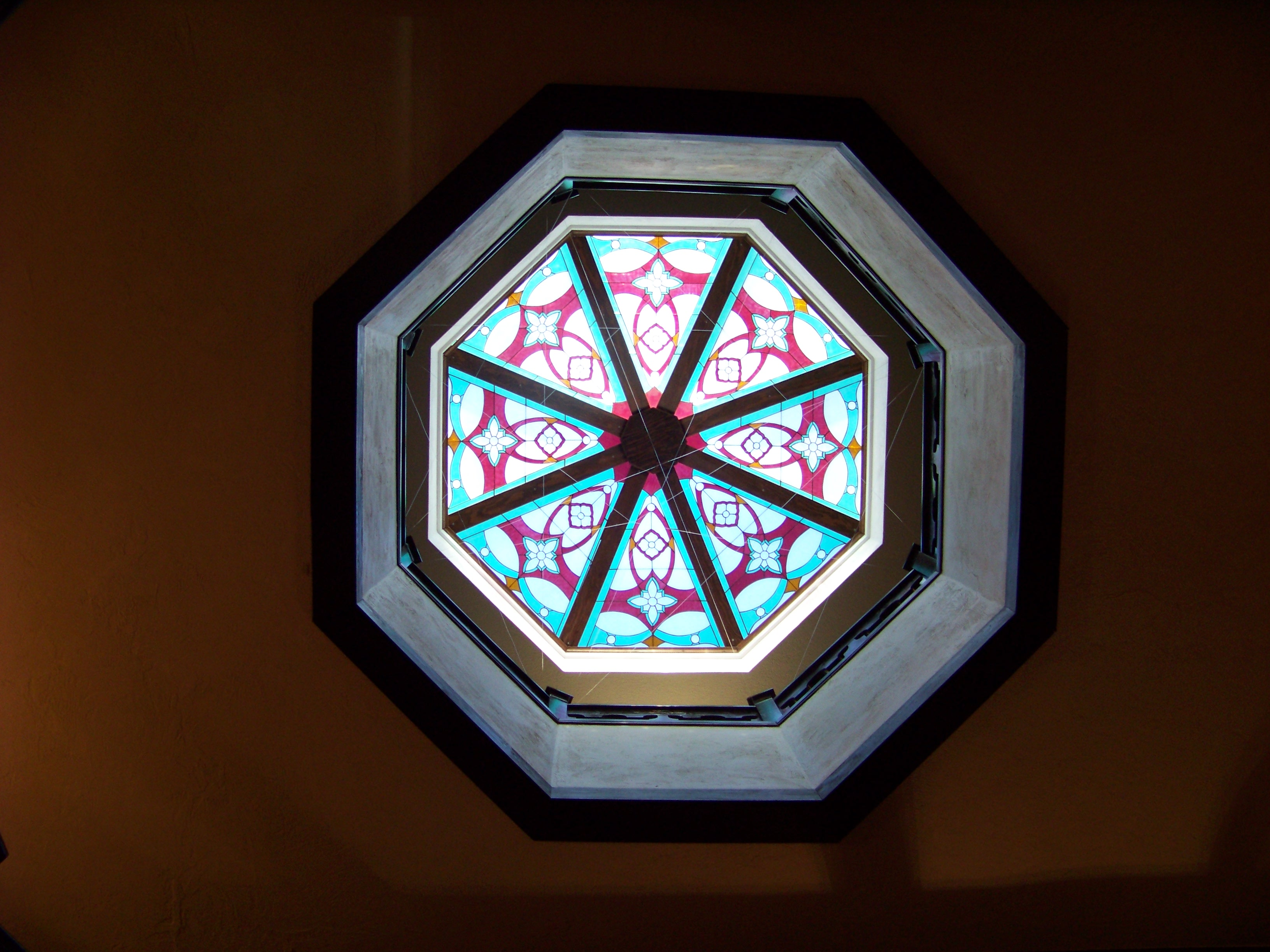
Stained glass skylight
