= Ormond Beach, Florida =

City in Volusia County, Florida, US

- City
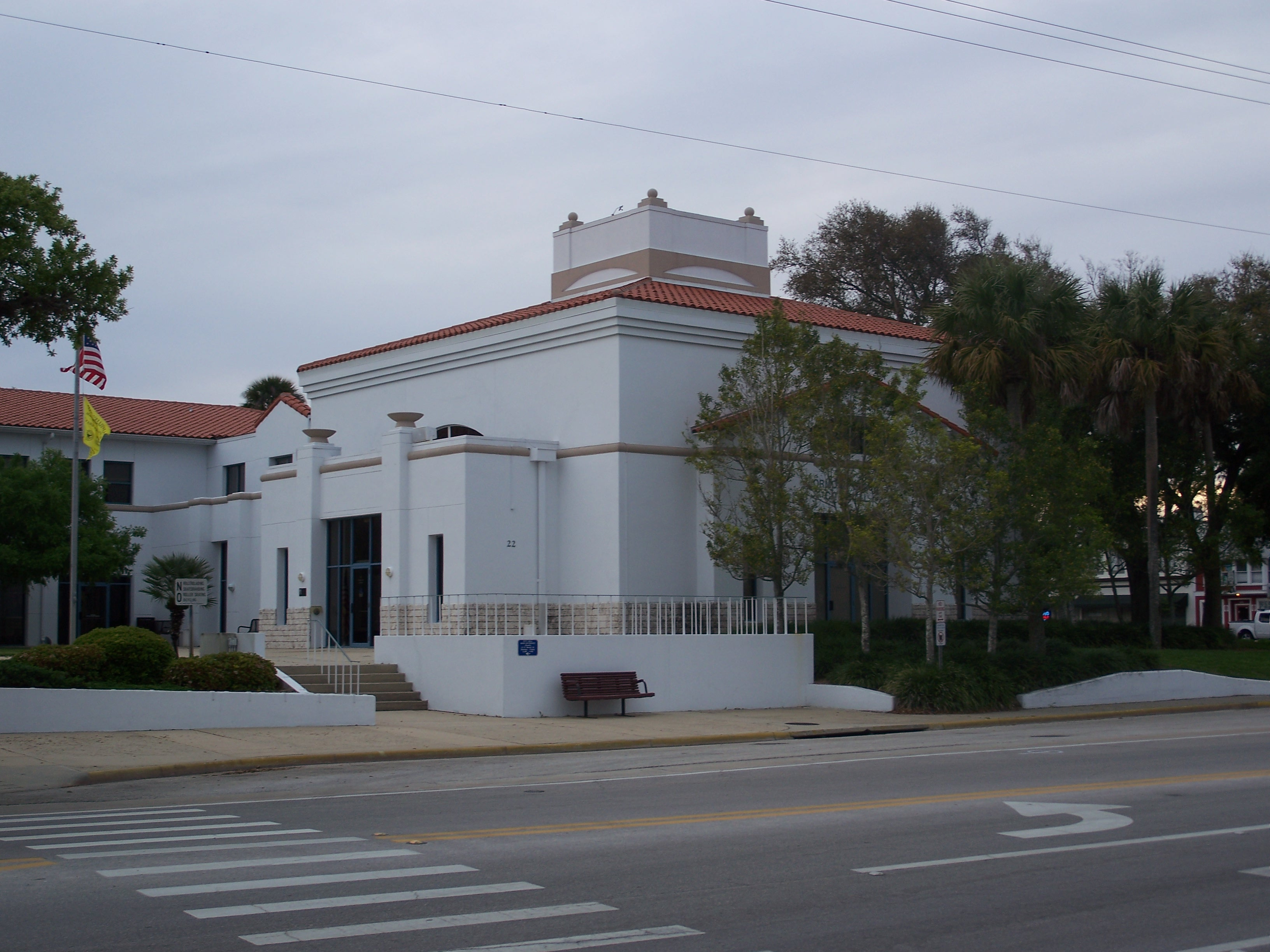
- Ormond Beach City Hall

- Logo
- Nickname: Birthplace of Speed
- Location in Volusia County and the state of Florida
- Coordinates: 29°17′11″N 81°07′30″W
- Country: United States
- State: Florida
- County: Volusia
- Settled by Native Timucuans (Nocoroco): c. early 1500s
- Settled by American colonizers (New Britain): c. 1860s–1870s
- Incorporated (Town of Ormond): April 22, 1880
- Incorporated (City of Ormond Beach): April 25, 1950

Government
  - Type: Commission–manager

Area
  - City: 38.91 sq mi (100.78 km^{2})
  - Land: 34.78 sq mi (90.09 km^{2})
  - Water: 4.13 sq mi (10.69 km^{2})
- Elevation: 3 ft (0.91 m)

Population (2020)
  - City: 43,080
  - Density: 1,238.5/sq mi (478.18/km^{2})
  - Urban: 349,064 (109th U.S.)
  - Metro: 609,939 (90th U.S.)
- Time zone: UTC−05:00 (Eastern (EST))
  - Summer (DST): UTC−04:00 (EDT)
- ZIP Codes: 32174–32176
- Area code: 386
- FIPS code: 12-53150
- GNIS feature ID: 2404445
- Website: www.ormondbeach.org

Ormond Beach is a city in Volusia County, Florida, United States. The population was 43,080 at the 2020 census. Ormond Beach lies directly north of Daytona Beach and is a principal city of the Deltona–Daytona Beach–Ormond Beach, FL Metropolitan Statistical Area. The city is known as the birthplace of speed, as early adopters of motorized cars flocked to its hard-packed beaches for yearlong entertainment, since paved roads were not yet commonplace. Ormond Beach lies in Central Eastern Florida.

== History ==
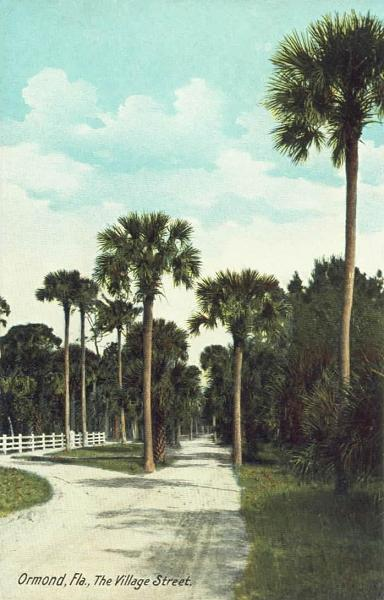
Village Street c. 1908

The native Timucuan people inhabited the area before the arrival of European colonists. Their settlement of Nocoroco was located where the Tomoka River joins the Halifax River, just north of present-day Ormond Beach, when Álvaro Mexía passed through it in 1605 on a mission to establish relations between Spanish Florida and the Surruque and Ais peoples of the coast of what are now Volusia and Brevard counties. Little is known of what happened to inhabitants of the area after Mexía's visit.

The city is named for James Ormond I, an Anglo-Irish-Scottish sea captain commissioned by King Ferdinand VII of Spain to bring Franciscan settlers to this part of Florida. Ormond had served Britain and Spain in the Napoleonic Wars of 1803-1815 as a ship captain, and was rewarded for his services to Spain by the King. Ormond later worked for the Scottish Indian trade company of Panton, Leslie & Company, and his armed brig was called the "Somerset". After returning to Spanish control, in 1821, Florida was acquired from Spain by the United States, but hostilities during the Second Seminole War delayed settlement until after 1842. In 1875, the community was founded as New Britain by inhabitants from New Britain, Connecticut, but would be incorporated on April 22, 1880, as the Town of Ormond for its early plantation owner.

With its hard, white beach, Ormond became popular for the wealthy seeking relief from northern winters during the Floridian boom in tourism following the Civil War. The St. Johns and Halifax Railway arrived in 1886, and the first bridge across the Halifax River was built in 1887. John Anderson and James Downing Price opened the Ormond Hotel on January 1, 1888. Henry Flagler bought the hotel in 1890 and expanded it to accommodate 600 guests. It would be one in a series of Gilded Age hotels catering to passengers aboard his Florida East Coast Railway, which had purchased the St. Johns & Halifax Railroad. Once a well-known landmark which was listed on the National Register of Historic Places in 1980, the hotel was razed in 1992.

On December 5, 1896, the Nathan F. Cobb, a Rockland, Maine-built wooden schooner launched in 1890, ran aground on a sandbar off Ormond.

One of Flagler's guests at the Ormond Hotel was his former business partner at the Standard Oil Company, John D. Rockefeller. The fellow tycoon arrived in 1914 and after four seasons at the hotel bought an estate called The Casements, that would be his winter home during the latter part of his life. Sold by his heirs in 1939, it was purchased by the city in 1973 and now serves as a cultural center. It is the community's best-known historical structure.

Beginning in 1902, some of the first automobile races were held on the compacted sand from Ormond south to Daytona Beach. Pioneers in the industry, including Ransom Olds with his Pirate Racer, and Alexander Winton, tested their inventions. The American Automobile Association brought timing equipment in 1903 and the area acquired the nickname the "Birthplace of Speed." In 1907, Glenn Curtiss set an unofficial world record of 136.36 miles per hour (219.45 km/h), on a 40 hp (30 kW) 269 cu in (4,410 cc) Curtiss V-8 motorcycle. Lee Bible, in the record-breaking, but fatal, White Triplex, was less fortunate. Driving on the beach is still permitted on some stretches.

The municipality was officially renamed as the City of Ormond Beach following a referendum held on April 25, 1950.

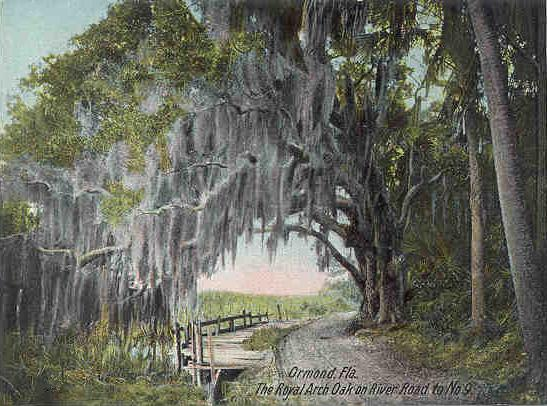
Royal Arch Oak c. 1905

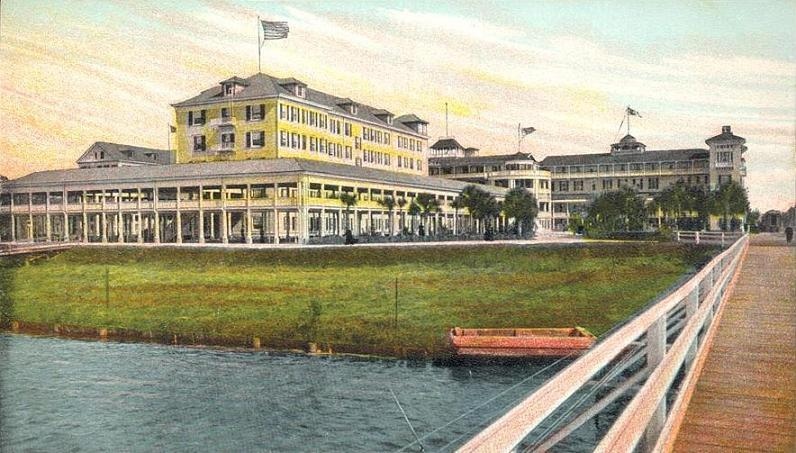
Ormond Hotel c. 1905

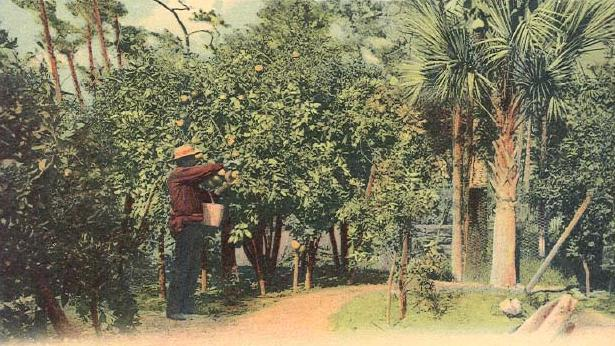
Orange Grove c. 1905

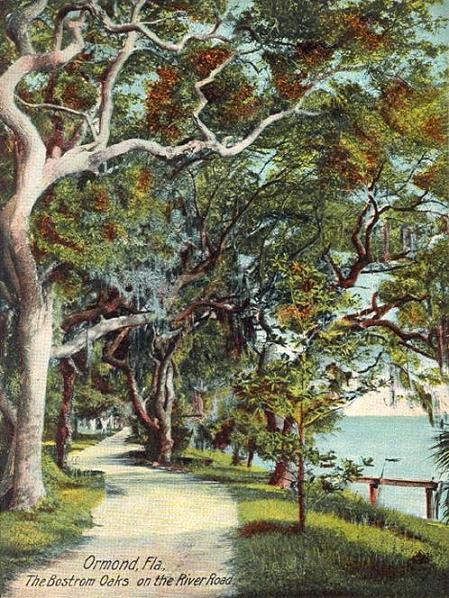
Bostrom Oakin c. 1908

Ormond Beach has four downtown riverfront parks and a beachfront park along with 37 other parks and gardens large and small. The historic shopping district located along Granada Boulevard from US Route A1A to Orchard Street is home to dozens of locally owned shops and restaurants along with historic and cultural sites.

== Geography ==
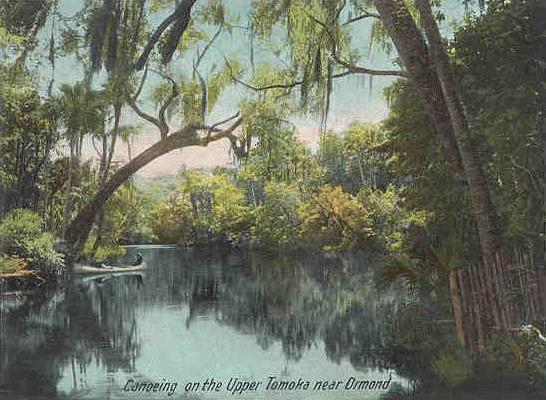
Tomoka River c. 1905

According to the United States Census Bureau, the city has a total area of 39.0 square miles (101.0 km^{2}), of which 31.9 square miles (82.7 km^{2}) is land, and 7.1 square miles (18.3 km^{2}) (18.12%) is water. Drained by the Tomoka River, Ormond Beach is located on the Halifax River lagoon and the Atlantic Ocean.

=== Climate ===
The climate in this area is characterized by hot, humid summers and generally mild winters. According to the Köppen climate classification, the City of Ormond Beach has a humid subtropical climate zone (Cfa).

== Demographics ==
Historical population
Census	Pop.	Note	%±
1890	239		—
1900	595		149.0%
1910	780		31.1%
1920	1,292		65.6%
1930	1,517		17.4%
1940	1,914		26.2%
1950	3,418		78.6%
1960	8,658		153.3%
1970	14,063		62.4%
1980	21,436		52.4%
1990	29,721		38.6%
2000	36,301		22.1%
2010	38,137		5.1%
2020	43,080		13.0%
2025 (est.)	44,692		3.7%
U.S. Decennial Census

=== Racial and ethnic composition ===
Ormond Beach racial composition (Hispanics excluded from racial categories) (NH = Non-Hispanic)
Race	Pop 2010	Pop 2020	% 2010	% 2020
White (NH)	33,920	35,455	88.94%	82.30%
Black or African American (NH)	1,196	1,669	3.14%	3.87%
Native American or Alaska Native (NH)	56	76	0.15%	0.18%
Asian (NH)	856	1,305	2.24%	3.03%
Pacific Islander or Native Hawaiian (NH)	13	13	0.03%	0.03%
Some other race (NH)	55	146	0.14%	0.34%
Two or more races/Multiracial (NH)	462	1,567	1.21%	3.64%
Hispanic or Latino (any race)	1,579	2,849	4.14%	6.61%
Total	38,137	43,080		

=== 2020 census ===
As of the 2020 census, Ormond Beach had a population of 43,080. The median age was 53.9 years. 15.9% of residents were under the age of 18 and 32.0% of residents were 65 years of age or older. For every 100 females there were 88.6 males, and for every 100 females age 18 and over there were 86.1 males age 18 and over.

97.9% of residents lived in urban areas, while 2.1% lived in rural areas.

There were 19,283 households in Ormond Beach, of which 20.5% had children under the age of 18 living in them. Of all households, 46.7% were married-couple households, 16.5% were households with a male householder and no spouse or partner present, and 29.8% were households with a female householder and no spouse or partner present. About 31.2% of all households were made up of individuals and 18.2% had someone living alone who was 65 years of age or older. There were 11,121 families in the city.

There were 21,451 housing units, of which 10.1% were vacant. The homeowner vacancy rate was 2.1% and the rental vacancy rate was 8.0%.

Racial composition as of the 2020 census
Race	Number	Percent
White	36,244	84.1%
Black or African American	1,710	4.0%
American Indian and Alaska Native	111	0.3%
Asian	1,314	3.1%
Native Hawaiian and Other Pacific Islander	16	0.0%
Some other race	753	1.7%
Two or more races	2,932	6.8%
Hispanic or Latino (of any race)	2,849	6.6%

=== 2010 census ===
As of the 2010 United States census, there were 38,137 people, 16,617 households, and 10,408 families residing in the city.

=== 2000 census ===
As of the census of 2000, there were 36,301 people, 15,629 households, and 10,533 families residing in the city. The population density was 1,409.8 inhabitants per square mile (544.3/km^{2}). There were 17,258 housing units at an average density of 670.2 units per square mile (258.8 units/km^{2}). The racial makeup of the city was 94.28% White, 2.75% African American, 0.17% Native American, 1.44% Asian, 0.02% Pacific Islander, 0.31% from other races, and 1.03% from two or more races. Hispanic or Latino of any race were 2.20% of the population.

In 2000, there were 15,629 households, out of which 23.5% had children under the age of 18 living with them, 55.7% were married couples living together, 8.8% had a female householder with no husband present, and 32.6% were non-families. 27.1% of all households were made up of individuals, and 15.3% had someone living alone who was 65 years of age or older. The average household size was 2.27 and the average family size was 2.75.

In 2000, in the city, the population was spread out, with 19.2% under the age of 18, 4.5% from 18 to 24, 22.4% from 25 to 44, 26.5% from 45 to 64, and 27.4% who were 65 years of age or older. The median age was 48 years. For every 100 females, there were 87.8 males. For every 100 females age 18 and over, there were 84.7 males.

In 2000, the median income for a household in the city was $43,364, and the median income for a family was $52,496. Males had a median income of $38,598 versus $26,452 for females. The per capita income for the city was $26,364. About 4.2% of families and 6.1% of the population were below the poverty line, including 7.3% of those under age 18 and 5.0% of those age 65 or over.

== Economy ==
Ormond Beach is an active commercial and residential market in the Deltona-Daytona Beach-Ormond Beach MSA.

Ormond Beach Business Park and Airpark, a foreign trade zone, is home to 29 companies that provide more than 2,000 jobs.

Recent studies show the workforce to be educated, productive, and competitive with 10 percent underemployed. Seven colleges and universities and the Advanced Technology Center support business needs with career advancement, workforce development, and research. Education, health care, and government are the largest employment sectors within the area. Ormond Beach is home to large sunscreen manufacturing for global brands Banana Boat and Hawaiian Tropic.

Among the corporations that call Ormond Beach home are:

- Costa Del Mar Headquarters (eye care products)
- First Green Bank
- Florida Production Engineering (automotive)
- Hawaiian Tropic - Tanning Research Laboratories (skin care products)
- ABB Thomas & Betts/Homac (electrical connectors, utility products)
- Hudson Technologies (deep draw manufacturer)
- Microflex Inc.
- U.S. Food Service (distributor)
- Vital Aire (health care)

== Government ==
The City of Ormond Beach has a commission-manager form of government. The mayor is independently elected citywide, in non-partisan elections, every two years. The city commission consists of four members, representing specific districts, elected to two-year terms in non-partisan elections.

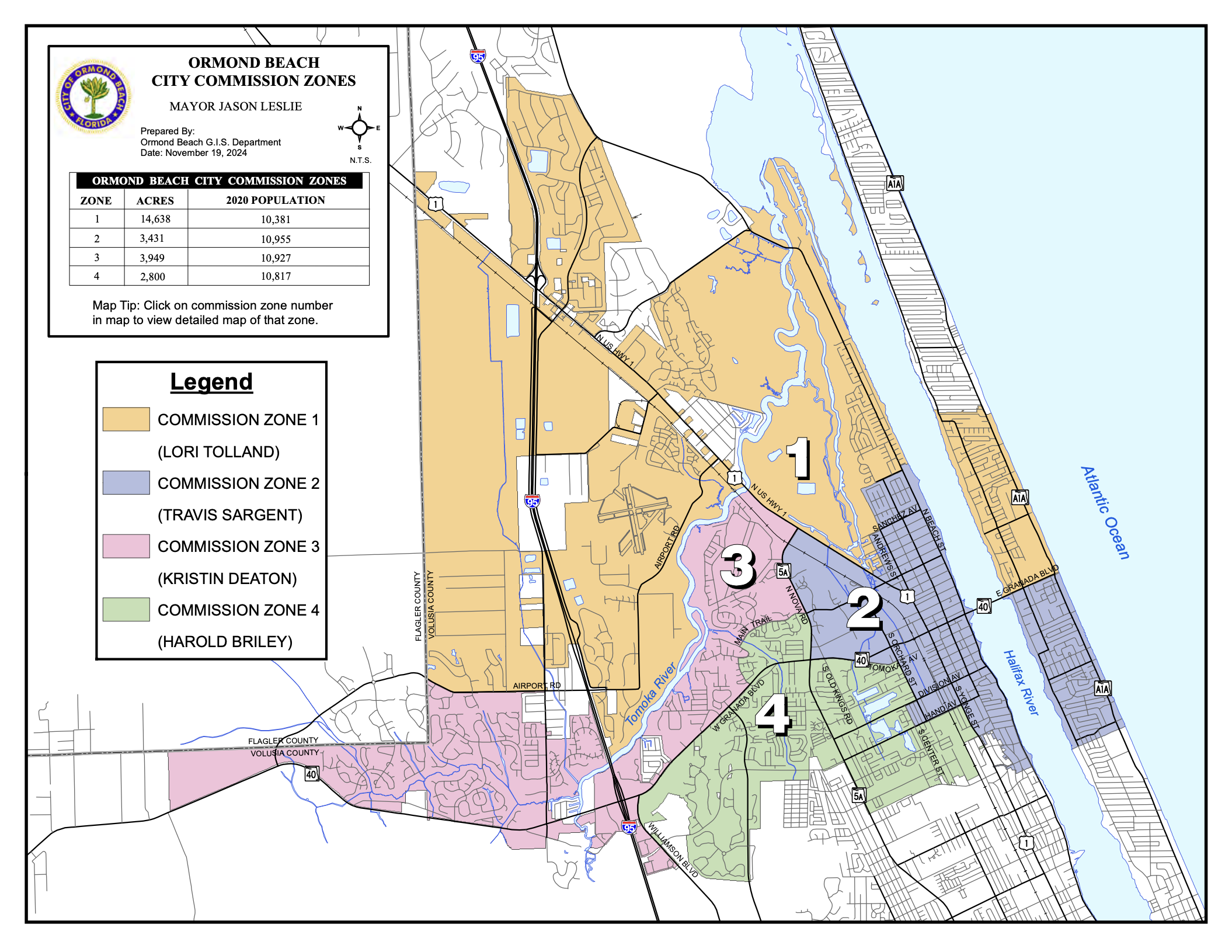
City Commission district map, 2025

=== Elected officials ===
Name	District	Term ends	Citations
Jason Leslie	Mayor	2026	
Lori Tolland	Zone 1 & Deputy Mayor	2026	
Travis Sargent	Zone 2	2026	
Kristin Deaton	Zone 3	2026	
Harold Briley	Zone 4	2026	

== Sites of interest ==
Historic places

- Anderson-Price Memorial Library Building
- The Casements
- Dix House
- Bulow Creek State Park
- Ormond Memorial Art Museum and Gardens
- North Peninsula State Park
- Tomoka State Park

== Transportation ==
=== Airports ===
The Ormond Beach Municipal Airport is the main airport in Ormond Beach. For more international travel, commuters would be required to drive to the Daytona Beach International Airport.

=== Major Roads ===
- I-95 (SR 9 / Interstate 95) is the main north–south interstate highway along the east coast of the state. Two interchanges exist within the city. The first is at Exit 268, also known as Florida State Road 40, and the second is at Exit 273, also known as US 1 (see below).
- US 1 (SR 5 / Ridgewood Avenue) is the main local road through Ormond Beach, running north–south. It served as the main north–south highway in the state and the eastern half of the county until I-95 was built. The route enters the city from the south at the border with Holly Hill, Florida and leaves just north after the interchange with Interstate 95.
- SR A1A (North Atlantic Avenue) is the state prefixed and suffixed, scenic coastal alternate route to US 1, which also includes some county road spurs and extensions.
- SR 5A (Nova Road) is the state suffixed alternate route of SR 5.
- SR 40 (Granada Boulevard)

=== Railroad ===
The main railroad line through Ormond Beach is the Florida East Coast Railway, which had a station within the city. Ormond Beach contained a connection to the former Ormond Hotel, which was accessed via the St. Johns and Halifax Railway. Passenger service ended in during the strike of 1963. Freight service continues to operate along the Florida East Coast Railway, but makes no stops within Ormond Beach.

== Media ==
=== Newspapers ===
- Daytona Beach News-Journal, daily newspaper covering the greater Daytona Beach area
- Hometown News, community newspaper in print on Fridays and daily on the Internet
- The Ormond Beach Observer, a weekly newspaper published in print on Thursdays and daily online, part of the Observer Media Group
- Ormond Local Pulse, a daily newsletter published daily by email and on the internet Focusing on local news for Ormond Beach and Ormond-By-The-Sea

=== Radio stations ===
==== AM ====
- WELE, 1380 AM, Ormond Beach, News/Talk

==== FM ====
- WAVX-LP, 107.1 FM, Ormond Beach, Contemporary Christian
- WHOG-FM, 95.7 FM, Ormond Beach, Classic Rock

== Notable people ==
- Paul America, actor
- Adelbert Ames, the last surviving general officer of the Civil War, who died at age 97, in 1933
- Lisa Andersen, pro surfer
- Ben Brainard, stand-up comedian and social media personality
- Shirley Chisholm, U.S. Congress member, U.S. presidential candidate
- David Allan Coe, musician
- Bryan Collyer, racing driver
- Phil Dalhausser, 2008 Olympic gold medalist in beach volleyball
- Jacob deGrom, MLB pitcher for the Texas Rangers
- Jimmy Foster, racing driver
- Alan Gustafson, NASCAR Cup Series crew chief for Hendrick Motorsports
- Brian Kelley, musician, member of Florida Georgia Line
- Paul LePage, politician
- Frederick Dana Marsh, artist
- John D. Rockefeller, billionaire industrialist
- Freelan Oscar Stanley and Francis Edgar Stanley, co-owners of the Stanley Motor Carriage Company
- Corey Walden, professional basketball player, 2019 Israeli Basketball Premier League MVP
- Harry Wendelstedt, baseball umpire
