= Derek West (baseball) =

Dutch-American baseball player (born 1996)

Leones del Escogido
- Pitcher
- Born: December 2, 1996 (age 29); Orange City, Florida, U.S.
- Bats: Right Throws: Right
- Stats at Baseball Reference

Derek John West (born December 2, 1996) is an American professional baseball pitcher for the Sioux City Explorers of the American Association of Professional Baseball.

== Amateur career ==
West attended University High School in Orange City, Florida. As a junior, he tore his hamstring playing for the school's basketball team and was told that he would not play baseball again; the pain went away after eight weeks and he was able to continue playing. He transferred to Trinity Christian Academy in Deltona, Florida in 2014. His fastball reached 94 miles per hour (151 km/h) as a senior. He committed to attend the University of Pittsburgh to play college baseball for the Pitt Panthers.

West missed his freshman year due to recovery from Tommy John surgery and his sophomore year due to surgery to repair his anterior and posterior cruciate ligaments in his right knee. In 2018, he had a 3.24 earned run average (ERA) and 47 strikeouts in 50 innings pitched and played collegiate summer baseball with the Wareham Gatemen of the Cape Cod Baseball League. The Atlanta Braves selected West in the 28th round of the 2018 MLB draft. He opted not to sign so that he could return to Pittsburgh for his senior year. In 2019, he had a 3.82 ERA and 82 strikeouts in 68 1/3 innings.

== Professional career ==
=== Houston Astros ===
The Houston Astros drafted West in the 14th round, with the 436th overall selection, of the 2019 Major League Baseball draft, and he signed. He made his professional debut with the Low-A Tri-City ValleyCats, making 13 appearances and recording a 6.75 ERA with 25 strikeouts. He did not play in a game in 2020 due to the cancellation of the minor league season because of the COVID-19 pandemic.

West returned to action in 2021, splitting the year between the rookie-level Florida Complex League Astros and High-A Asheville Tourists. In 8 appearances for the two affiliates, he had a 6.52 ERA with 15 strikeouts across 9 2/3 innings. West spent the 2022 season with Asheville and the Double-A Corpus Christi Hooks, with a 4.45 ERA, 68 strikeouts, and 6 saves across 39 relief appearances. While he played for Asheville in 2022, West's fastball touched 98 miles per hour (158 km/h).

West returned to Corpus Christi in 2023, posting a 5.54 ERA with 14 strikeouts across 10 games. On March 17, 2024, the Astros released West.

=== Rieleros de Aguascalientes ===
On April 7, 2024, West signed with the Rieleros de Aguascalientes of the Mexican League. In 16 starts for Aguascalientes, he compiled a 6–2 record and 5.18 ERA with 59 strikeouts across 73 innings pitched. West was released by the Rieleros on October 23.

=== Bravos de León ===
On March 24, 2025, West signed with the Bravos de León of the Mexican League. In eight appearances (six starts) for León, he struggled to a 1–4 record and 7.45 ERA with 19 strikeouts over 29 innings of work. On June 25, León released West.

=== Leones de Yucatán ===
On July 11, 2025, West signed with the Leones de Yucatán of the Mexican League. He made six appearances (one start) for Yucatán, logging an 0-1 record and 3.31 ERA with 16 strikeouts across 16 1/3 innings pitched. West was released by the Leones on November 26.

West made 14 relief appearances for the Leones in 2026, posting a 1-0 record with a 4.50 ERA and 16 strikeouts across 16 innings pitched.

=== Caliente de Durango ===
On May 25, 2026, West was traded to the Caliente de Durango of the Mexican League. West made 25 appearances for Durango, recording a 3.09 ERA with 33 strikeouts and four saves across 23 1/3 innings pitched.

=== Sioux City Explorers ===
On August 29, 2026, West signed with the Sioux City Explorers of the American Association of Professional Baseball.

== International career ==
West is of Dutch descent through his maternal grandparents. He was named to the Netherlands national baseball team for the 2023 World Baseball Classic.
