= Gerard Ross =

American football player (born 1982)

No. 35
- Position: Cornerback

Personal information
- Born: December 27, 1982 (age 43); Jacksonville, Florida
- Listed height: 6 ft 3 in (1.91 m)
- Listed weight: 198 lb (90 kg)

Career information
- High school: Trinity Christian Academy (Deltona, Florida)
- College: Florida State

Career history
- 2006: Seattle Seahawks
- Stats at Pro Football Reference

Gerard C. Ross (born December 27, 1982) is an American former professional football player for the Seattle Seahawks of the National Football League (NFL). He played college football for the Florida State Seminoles. He was signed by the Seahawks in 2006, activated to their active roster in January 2007. He played in one playoff game for the Seahawks during the 2006 season.
