= Blake Hinson =

American basketball player (born 1999)

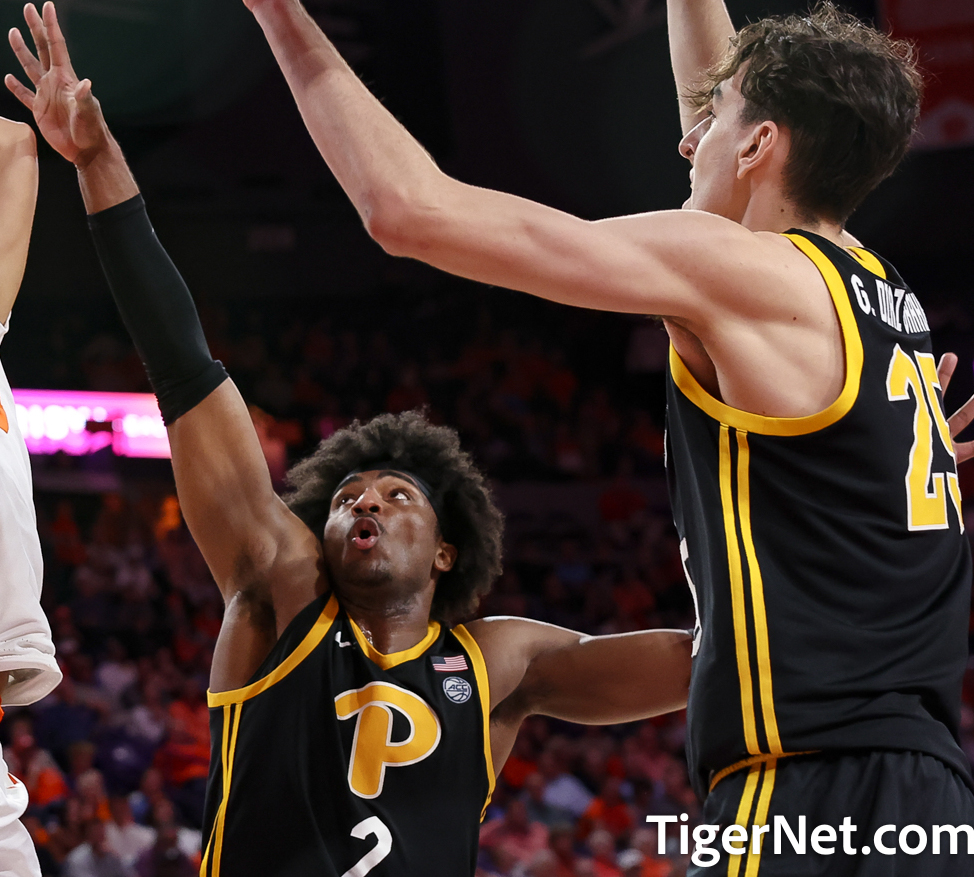
- Hinson (2) with Pittsburgh in 2024

No. 42 – Stockton Kings
- Position: Small forward
- League: NBA G League

Personal information
- Born: December 26, 1999 (age 26) Daytona Beach, Florida, U.S.
- Listed height: 6 ft 8 in (2.03 m)
- Listed weight: 230 lb (104 kg)

Career information
- High school: Deltona (Deltona, Florida); Sunrise Christian Academy (Bel Aire, Kansas)
- College: Ole Miss (2018–2020); Pittsburgh (2022–2024)
- NBA draft: 2024: undrafted
- Playing career: 2024–present

Career history
- 2024–2025: Santa Cruz Warriors
- 2025–2026: Rip City Remix
- 2026: Utah Jazz
- 2026: →Salt Lake City Stars
- 2026–present: Stockton Kings

Career highlights
- NBA G League Next Up Game (2026); First-team All-ACC (2024); Second-team All-ACC (2023)
- Stats at NBA.com
- Stats at Basketball Reference

Blake Demond Hinson (born December 26, 1999) is an American professional basketball player for the Stockton Kings of the NBA G League. He played college basketball for the Ole Miss Rebels and the Pittsburgh Panthers.

== Early life and high school career ==
Hinson grew up in Deltona, Florida, and initially attended Deltona High School. He transferred to Sunrise Christian Academy in Bel Aire, Kansas, before the start of his senior season.

== College career ==
Hinson began his college career at Ole Miss. He started 31 games and averaged 8.3 points and 2.9 rebounds as a freshman. Hinson averaged 10.1 points, 4.6 rebounds, and 1.4 assists during his sophomore season. After the season, he entered the NCAA transfer portal.

Hinson transferred to Iowa State. He missed his first season with the Cyclones due to an unspecified medical condition. Hinson left the program shortly before the start of the 2021–2022 season.

Hinson transferred a second time to Pittsburgh. He was named second-team All-Atlantic Coast Conference (ACC) in his first season with the team after averaging 15.3 points and 6.0 rebounds. Hinson was named first-team All-ACC in his final season at Pitt. He averaged 18.5 points per game and set a school record with 110 made three-pointers.

== Professional career ==
After going unselected in the 2024 NBA draft, Hinson signed a two-way contract with the Los Angeles Lakers on July 5, 2024, but was waived on September 16 and seven days later, he signed with the Golden State Warriors. However, he was waived on October 19 and nine days later, he joined the Santa Cruz Warriors. On March 28, 2025, Hinson tied a Santa Cruz record with 10 made three-pointers, as he scored a career-high 44 points in a 150-105 rout of the Rip City Remix.

For the 2025–26 season, Hinson was added to the roster of the Portland Trail Blazers' NBA G League affiliate, the Rip City Remix.

On February 9, 2026, Hinson signed a two-way contract with the Utah Jazz. On February 28, Hinson made his first career NBA start in a home game against the New Orleans Pelicans. He was moved into the starting lineup in place of John Konchar. On April 11, Hinson scored a career-high 30 points in a 147–101 win over the Memphis Grizzlies.

== Career statistics ==
Legend
GP	Games played	GS	Games started	MPG	Minutes per game
FG%	Field goal percentage	3P%	3-point field goal percentage	FT%	Free throw percentage
RPG	Rebounds per game	APG	Assists per game	SPG	Steals per game
BPG	Blocks per game	PPG	Points per game	**Bold**	Career high

=== NBA ===
Year	Team	GP	GS	MPG	FG%	3P%	FT%	RPG	APG	SPG	BPG	PPG
2025–26	Utah	14	3	20.4	.513	.468	.750	2.4	1.1	.4	.1	11.9
Career		14	3	20.4	.513	.468	.750	2.4	1.1	.4	.1	11.9
