= Jalyx Hunt =

American football player (born 2001)

No. 58 – Philadelphia Eagles
- Position: Outside linebacker
- Roster status: Active

Personal information
- Born: March 13, 2001 (age 25); Debary, Florida, U.S.
- Listed height: 6 ft 3 in (1.91 m)
- Listed weight: 252 lb (114 kg)

Career information
- High school: University (Orange City, Florida)
- College: Cornell (2019–2021); Houston Christian (2022–2023)
- NFL draft: 2024: 3rd round, 94th overall pick

Career history
- Philadelphia Eagles (2024–present)

Awards and highlights
- Super Bowl champion (LIX); Second-team FCS All-American (2023); SLC Defensive Player of the Year (2023); Second-team All-SLC (2022)

Career NFL statistics as of 2025
- Total tackles: 81
- Sacks: 8
- Forced fumbles: 4
- Fumble recoveries: 1
- Pass deflections: 4
- Interceptions: 3
- Defensive touchdowns: 1
- Stats at Pro Football Reference

Jalyx Benjamin Hunt (JAY-liks; born March 13, 2001) is an American professional football outside linebacker for the Philadelphia Eagles of the National Football League (NFL). He played college football for the Cornell Big Red and the Houston Christian Huskies and was selected by the Eagles in the third round of the 2024 NFL draft.

== Early life ==
Hunt spent several years in Maryland and then South Carolina before moving to Florida. In 2011, he won Amateur Athletic Union (AAU) championships at the Junior Olympic Games in triathlon and long jump. He attended Dutch Fork High School in South Carolina for one year, playing varsity football despite being a freshman.

Hunt then moved to Florida and attended University High School in Orange City for his sophomore through senior years. He played football, basketball, and participated in track & field in the high jump, long jump, and triple jump at University High School. He was named all-county at wide receiver in his senior year, totaling 20 receptions for 475 yards and two touchdowns while being co-team captain and offensive MVP. He committed to play college football for the Cornell Big Red, being an unranked prospect.

== College career ==
Hunt began his collegiate career as a safety at Cornell in 2019, playing seven games and posting three tackles. The 2020 season was canceled due to the COVID-19 pandemic. He had 26 tackles in 10 games in 2021. Hunt opted to transfer to the Houston Baptist Huskies – soon after renamed the Houston Christian Huskies – in 2022. He moved to the defensive line at Houston Christian and was second-team All-Southland Conference in 2022, either holding or tying for the conference lead in tackles-for-loss (11.5), sacks (7) and forced fumbles (3). Hunt returned in 2023 and was named the Southland Conference Defensive Player of the Year and an All-American; he ended his two-year Houston Christian stint with 133 tackles, 20.5 tackles-for-loss and 13.5 sacks. He was invited to the 2024 Senior Bowl and became the first player from his school ever to receive the honor, as well as being one of only four from the FCS to receive an invite that year.

== Professional career ==
Pre-draft measurables
Height	Weight	Arm length	Hand span	Wingspan	40-yard dash	10-yard split	20-yard split	20-yard shuttle	Three-cone drill	Vertical jump	Broad jump	Bench press
6 ft 3 3/4 in (1.92 m)	252 lb (114 kg)	34 3/8 in (0.87 m)	10 in (0.25 m)	6 ft 10 3/4 in (2.10 m)	4.64 s	1.60 s	2.68 s	4.38 s	7.18 s	37.5 in (0.95 m)	10 ft 8 in (3.25 m)	19 reps
All values from NFL Combine/Pro Day

Hunt was selected by the Philadelphia Eagles in the third round (94th overall pick) of the 2024 NFL draft, becoming the first player to be drafted in the history of Houston Christian. Hunt recorded a half-sack in Super Bowl LIX, a 40–22 win over the Kansas City Chiefs.

Hunt began the 2025 campaign as one of Philadelphia's starting linebackers. In Week 7 against the Minnesota Vikings, Hunt recorded his first career interception against Carson Wentz, and returned the ball 42 yards for his first career touchdown. Hunt finished the 2025 regular season leading the team both in sacks (6.5) and interceptions (3), becoming the first player in Eagles history to lead the team in sacks and interceptions in a season.

== NFL career statistics ==
Legend
	Won the Super Bowl
**Bold**	Career high

=== Regular season ===
Year	Team	Games		Tackles					Fumbles			Interceptions					
Year	Team	GP	GS	Comb	Solo	Ast	Sack	TFL	FF	FR	Yds	Int	Yds	Avg	Lng	TD	PD
2024	PHI	16	1	21	12	9	1.5	1	**2**	0	0	0	0	0.0	0	0	1
2025	PHI	17	9	**52**	**28**	**24**	**6.5**	**9**	**2**	**1**	0	**3**	**53**	**17.7**	**42**	**1**	**3**
Career		33	10	73	40	33	8.0	10	4	1	0	3	53	17.7	42	1	4

=== Postseason ===
Year	Team	Games		Tackles					Fumbles			Interceptions					
Year	Team	GP	GS	Comb	Solo	Ast	Sack	TFL	FF	FR	Yds	Int	Yds	Avg	Lng	TD	PD
2024	PHI	4	0	**10**	**7**	**3**	**1.5**	**1**	0	0	0	0	0	0.0	0	0	0
2025	PHI	1	0	0	0	0	0.0	0	0	0	0	0	0	0.0	0	0	0
Career		5	0	10	7	3	1.5	1	0	0	0	0	0	0.0	0	0	0

== Personal life ==
Hunt is a member of Alpha Phi Alpha.
