= Volusia County Schools =

School district in Florida, United States

Coordinates: 29.0298°N 81.3088°W

Location
- 200 North Clara Avenue; DeLand Volusia County, Florida United States

District information
- Type: Public
- Grades: Pre-K to 12th
- Superintendent: Carmen Balgobin
- Schools: 92 (2019-20)
- Budget: $862.8 million
- NCES District ID: 1201920

Students and staff
- Students: 62750 (2021–22)
- Teachers: 3755.88 (2016–17)
- Student–teacher ratio: 16.83

Other information
- Website: www.vcsedu.org

Volusia County Schools is the public school district for Volusia County, Florida, United States. The district serves the 16 cities of Daytona Beach, DeBary, DeLand, DeLeon Springs, Deltona, Edgewater, Enterprise, Holly Hill, Lake Helen, New Smyrna Beach, Oak Hill, Orange City, Ormond Beach, Osteen, Pierson, and Port Orange. It is the 57th largest school district in the United States and serves approximately 63,000 students. The district is composed of 45 elementary schools, 12 middle schools, and 9 high schools. In addition there are 8 alternative schools, 7 charter schools, 1 combination schools (6-12), and 1 district virtual instruction program. The district is accredited by the Southern Association of Colleges and Schools/AdvancED.

== Leadership ==
Volusia County Schools is led by Superintendent Dr. Carmen Balgobin and five elected members of the school board, one from each district in the county.

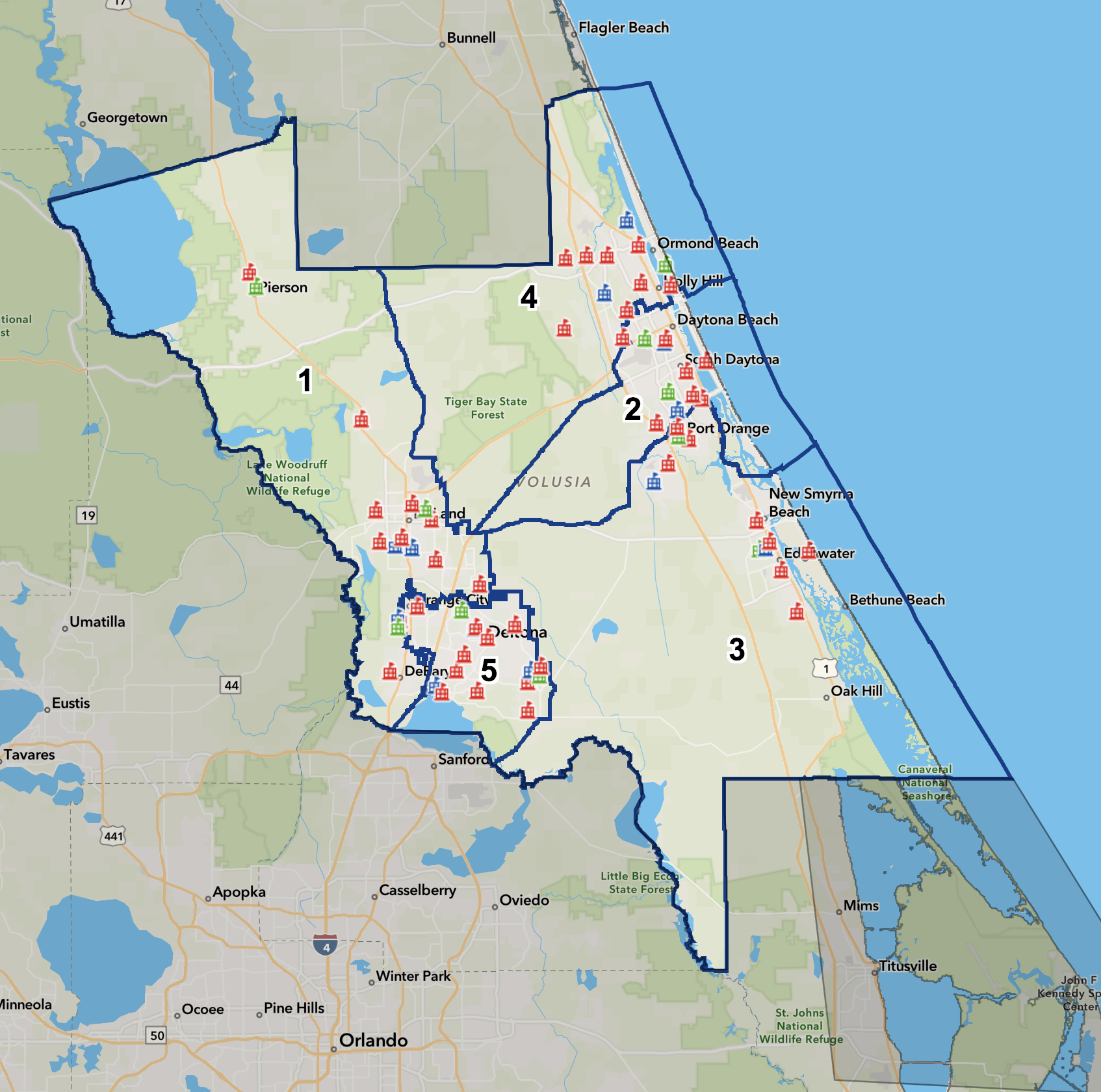
School board district map in 2025

=== Volusia County School Board ===
Name	District	Term ends	Citations
Jamie Haynes	District 1 & Chair	2026	
Krista Goodrich	District 2	2028	
Jessie Thompson	District 3	2026	
Donna Brosemer	District 4	2028	
Ruben Colón	District 5 & Vice Chair	2026	

== Elementary schools ==
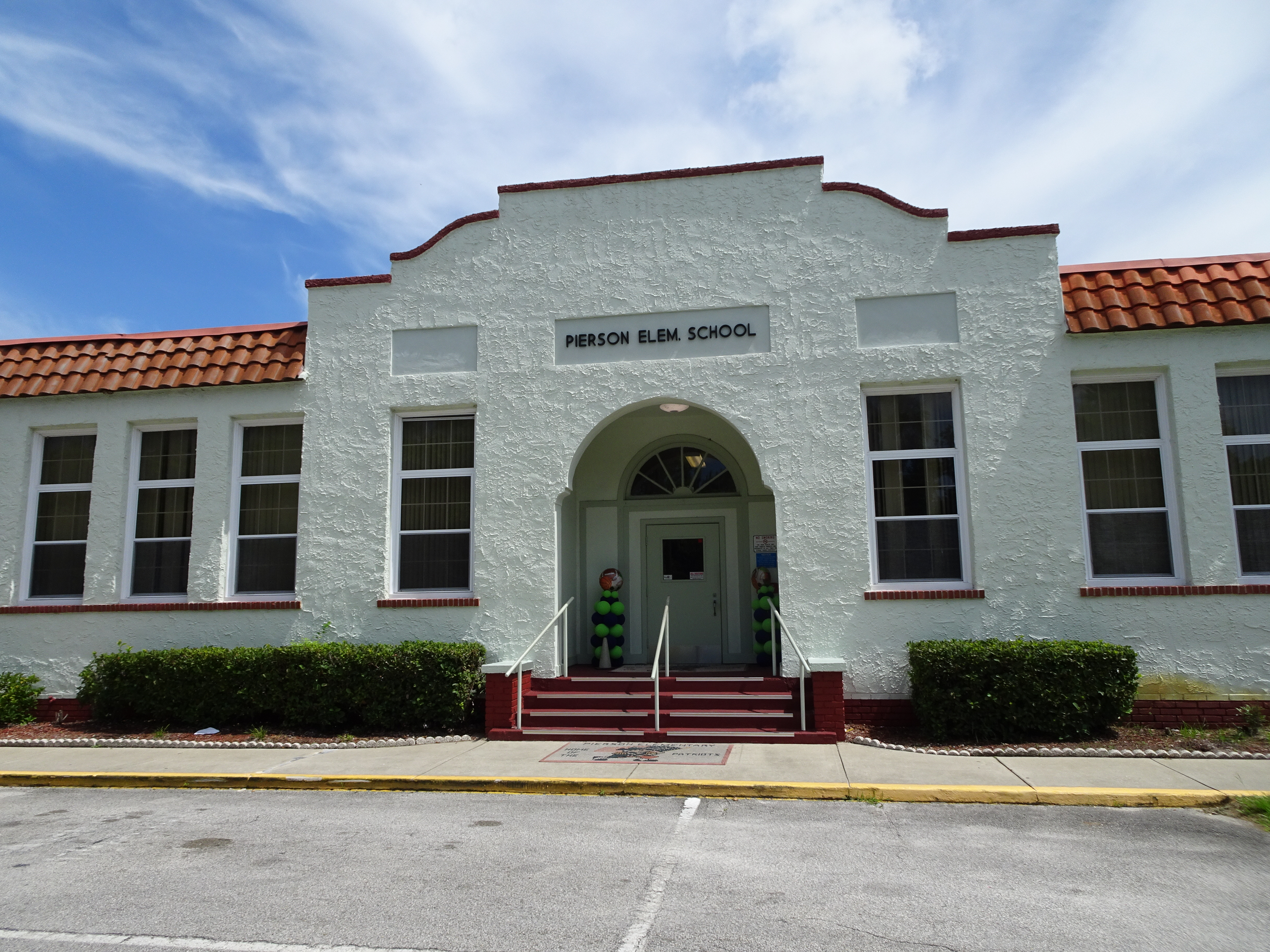
Pierson Elementary School

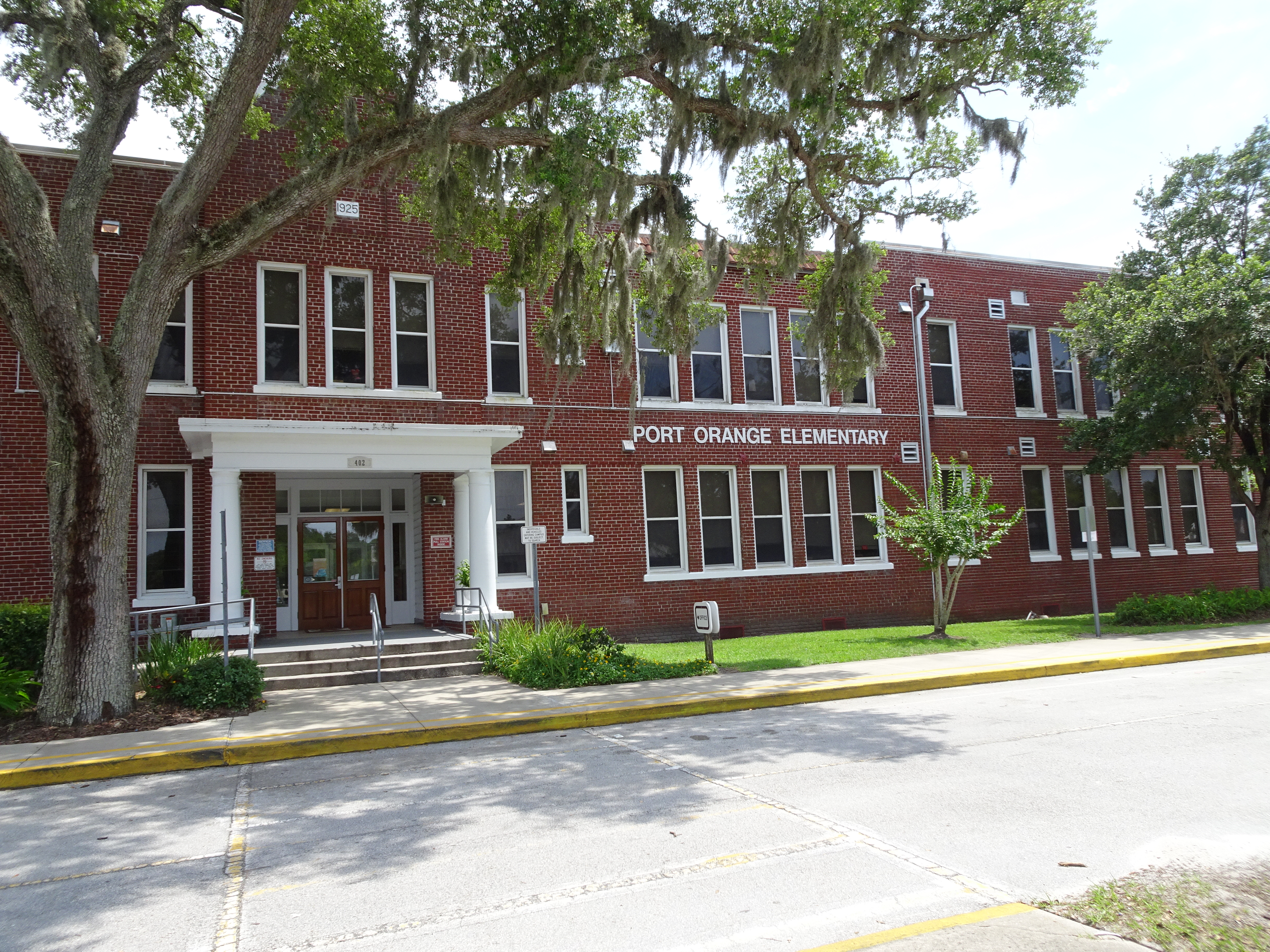
Port Orange Elementary School

- Beachside Elementary
- Blue Lake Elementary
- Champion Elementary (formerly Hurst)
- Chisholm Elementary
- Citrus Grove Elementary
- Coronado Beach Elementary
- Cypress Creek Elementary
- DeBary Elementary
- Deltona Lakes Elementary
- Discovery Elementary
- Edgewater Public School
- Edith I. Starke Elementary
- Enterprise Elementary
- Forest Lake Elementary
- Freedom Elementary
- Friendship Elementary
- Holly Hill School (K-5)
- Horizon Elementary
- Indian River Elementary
- Manatee Cove Elementary
- George W. Marks Elementary
- Louise S. McInnis Elementary
- Orange City Elementary
- Ormond Beach Elementary
- Osteen Elementary
- Palm Terrace Elementary
- Pathways Elementary
- Pierson Elementary
- Pine Trail Elementary
- Port Orange Elementary
- Pride Elementary
- R. J. Longstreet Elementary
- Read-Pattillo Elementary
- South Daytona Elementary
- Spirit Elementary
- Spruce Creek Elementary
- Sugar Mill Elementary
- Sunrise Elementary
- Sweetwater Elementary
- Timbercrest Elementary
- Tomoka Elementary
- Turie T. Small Elementary
- Volusia Pines Elementary
- Westside Elementary
- Woodward Avenue Elementary
- William Meri Jr Elementary School

== Middle schools ==
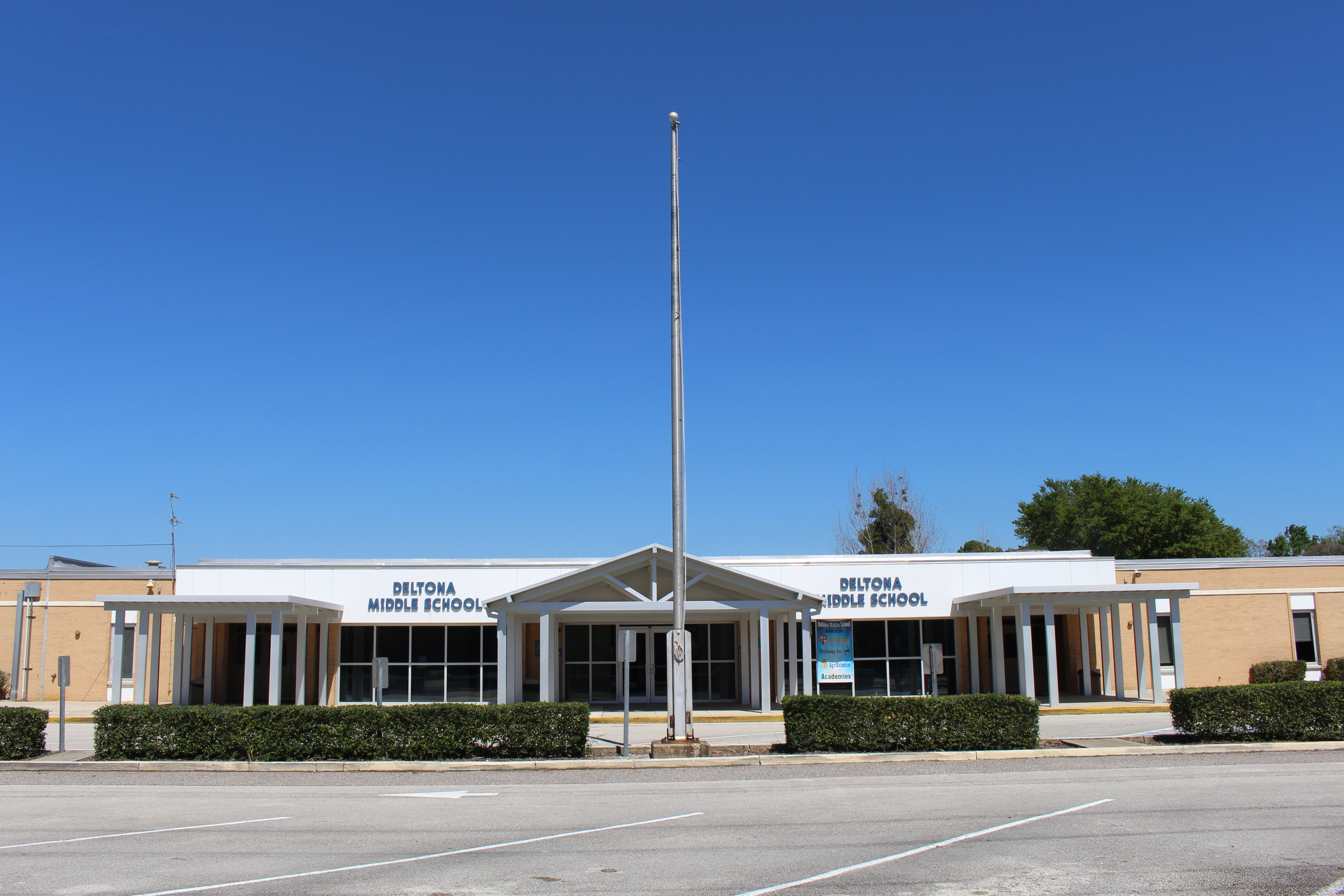
Deltona Middle School

School name	Location	Principal
Campbell Middle	Daytona Beach	Marcia Owens
Creekside Middle	Port Orange	John Cash
David C. Hinson Sr. Middle	Daytona Beach	William Dunnigan
DeLand Middle	DeLand	John Devito
Deltona Middle	Deltona	Stephen Hinson
Galaxy Middle	Deltona	Eidie Velez
Heritage Middle	Deltona	Nicholas Fidance
New Smyrna Beach Middle	New Smyrna Beach	Rebecca Porter
Ormond Beach Middle	Ormond Beach	Heather Iannarelli
River Springs Middle	Orange City	Thomas Vaughan
Silver Sands Middle	Port Orange	Dr. Rick Inge
Southwestern Middle	DeLand	Jacquese J. Copeland

== High schools ==
School name	Nickname	Location	Attendance	Principal	School Colors
Atlantic High School	Sharks	Port Orange	1,129	Jason Watson	
DeLand High School	Bulldogs	DeLand	2,320	Mike Degirolmo	
Deltona High School	Wolves	Deltona	1,749	Christina Lapnow	
Mainland High School	Buccaneers	Daytona Beach	2,010	Joseph Castelli	
New Smyrna Beach High School	Barracudas	New Smyrna Beach	1,895	Timothy Merrick	
Pine Ridge High School	Panthers	Deltona	1,700	William Ryser	
Seabreeze High School	Sandcrabs	Daytona Beach	1,598	Tucker Harris	
Spruce Creek High School	Hawks	Port Orange	2,623	Dr. Todd Sparger	
T. Dewitt Taylor Middle-High School	Wildcats	Pierson	—	Jonathan Pearce	
University High School	Titans	Orange City	2,824	Amanda Wiles	

== Charter schools ==
- Burns Science and Technology Charter School (K-12)
- Ivy Hawn Charter School of the Arts (K-8)
- Richard Milburn Academy (9-12)
- Richard Milburn Academy West (9-12)
- Samsula Academy (K-5)
- The Chiles Academy (6-12)

== Alternative education ==
- Department of Juvenile Justice Educational Programs
- Highbanks Learning Center
- PACE Center for Girls
- Pathways Blended Education, Inc.
- Riverview Learning Center
- Halifax Behavioral Services
- Hospital Homebound
- Legacy Scholars
- Stewart Marchman Center
