= Deltona High School =

Coordinates: 28°56′40″N 81°14′48″W

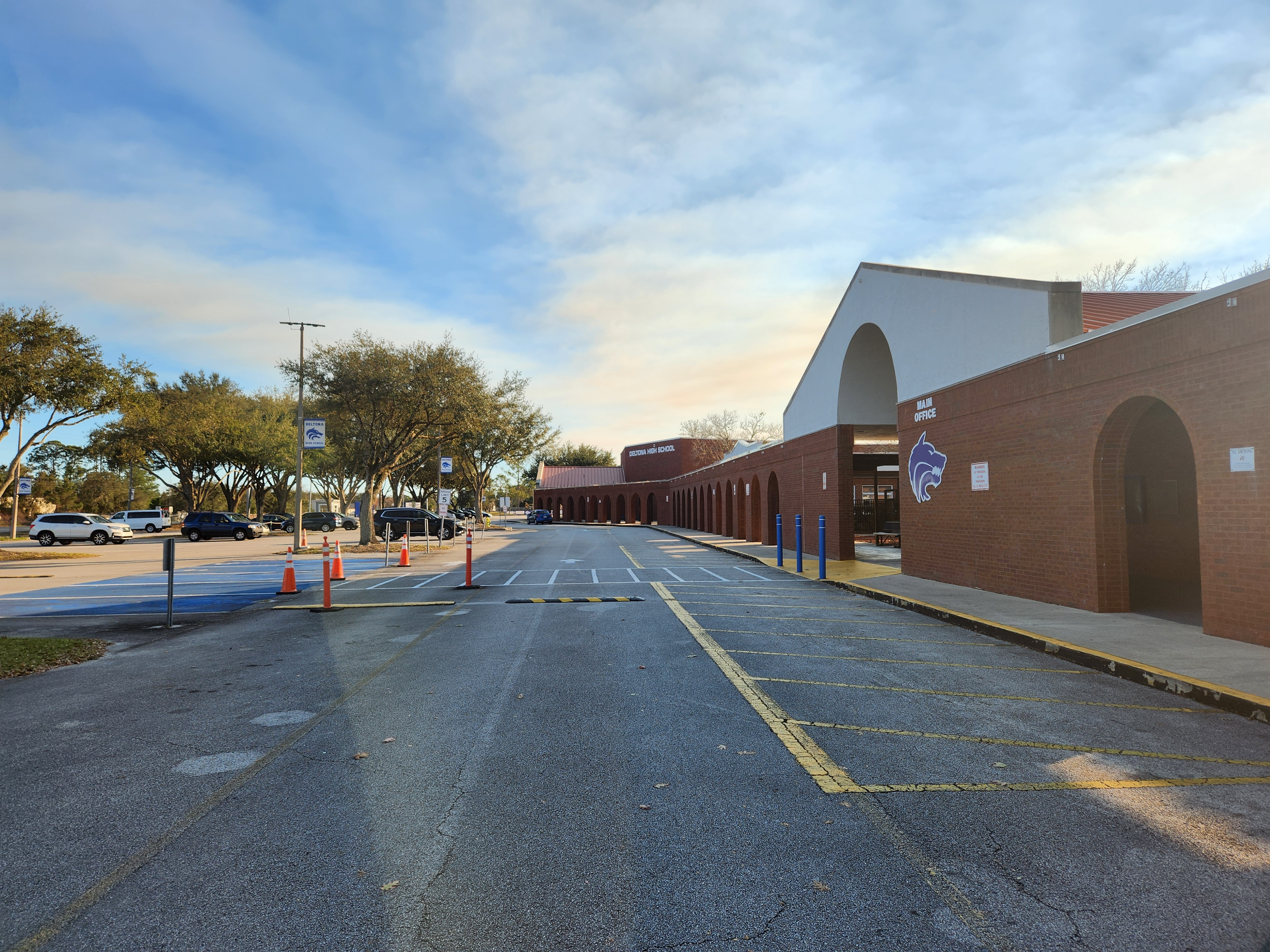
- Coat of arms of Deltona High School (top) and the entrance of the school (bottom)

Location
- 100 Wolf Pack Run; Deltona, Florida; United States

Information
- Type: Public
- Motto: Reaching for the Stars
- Established: 1988
- School district: Volusia County Schools
- Principal: Christina Lapnow
- Teaching staff: 88.51 (FTE)
- Grades: 9–12
- Enrollment: 1,787 (2023-2024)
- Student to teacher ratio: 20.19
- Campus: Suburban
- Colors: Royal Blue, Silver, Black White
- Athletics: FHSAA
- Mascot: Wolf
- Rival: Pine Ridge High School
- Yearbook: Canidaean
- Website: www.dhswolves.com

Deltona High School is a public high school located in Deltona, Florida, United States. It is located on Wolf Pack Run, east of Interstate 4 in the city's northwestern corner. In the 2011–2012 academic school year, the school enrolled 1,666 students in grades 9–12. The school was opened in 1988. It was the first high school in Volusia County to be built since Spruce Creek High School in 1975. The school's main "rival", Pine Ridge High School, is also on Howland Boulevard.

== History ==
Deltona High opened on August 29, 1988, as the city's first high school.

In 2026, Deltona High School was selected for a pilot programming involving drones responding to emergencies on campus.

== Notable alumni ==
- Chad Brown (born 1996), Professional basketball player
- Luke Delaney, retired major in the United States Marine Corps, selected for astronaut candidacy in NASA Astronaut Group 23
- Montana DuRapau, MLB baseball player
- Blake Hinson, basketball player
- Dennis Mulder, former mayor of Deltona Florida 2005–2010
- Jack López, MLB baseball player
