= Orange City Historic District =

Historic district in Florida, United States

- U.S. National Register of Historic Places
- U.S. Historic district
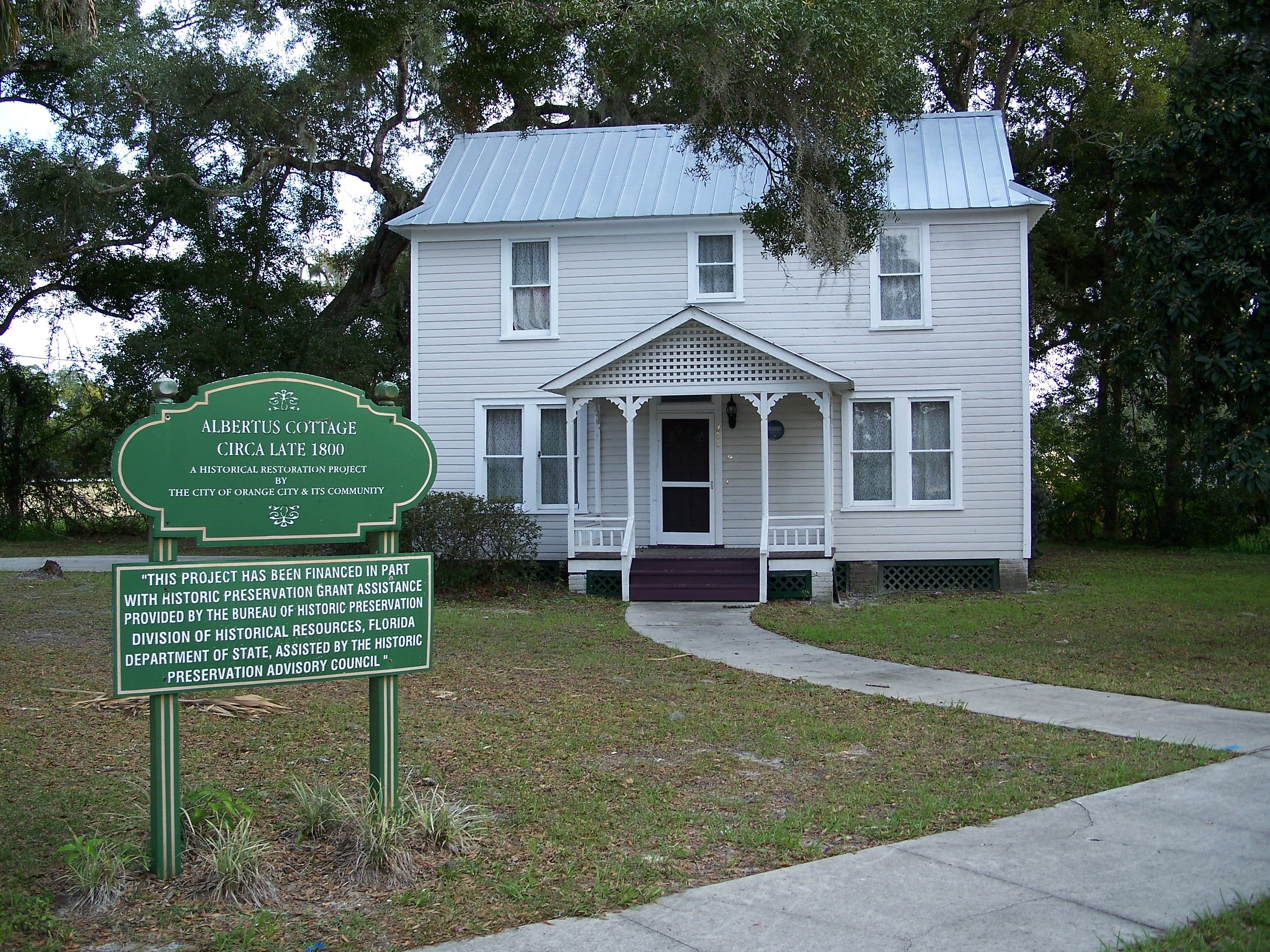
- Albertus Cottage, in the Orange City Historic District

- Location within Volusia County
- Location: Orange City, Florida United States
- Coordinates: 28°56′56″N 81°17′57″W
- Area: 1,100 acres (4.5 km^{2})
- NRHP reference No.: 04000265
- Added to NRHP: April 6, 2004

The Orange City Historic District is a U.S. historic district (designated as such on April 6, 2004) located in Orange City, Florida. The district is roughly bounded by Banana, Carpenter, French and Orange Avenues. It contains 211 historic buildings and 3 structures.

A notable part of the historic district is the 1876 Heritage Inn. Since 1876, the 1876 Heritage Inn has been known as a remnant of the Orange City Historic District. The historic inn is the oldest operating hotel in Volusia County. The hotel was originally built as a resort hotel and for a long time was the only one in the area. The 1876 Heritage Inn has served as a place for the local townies to celebrate the holiday across the decades and now is still serving its guests who are looking for that antique feel.

== Gallery ==
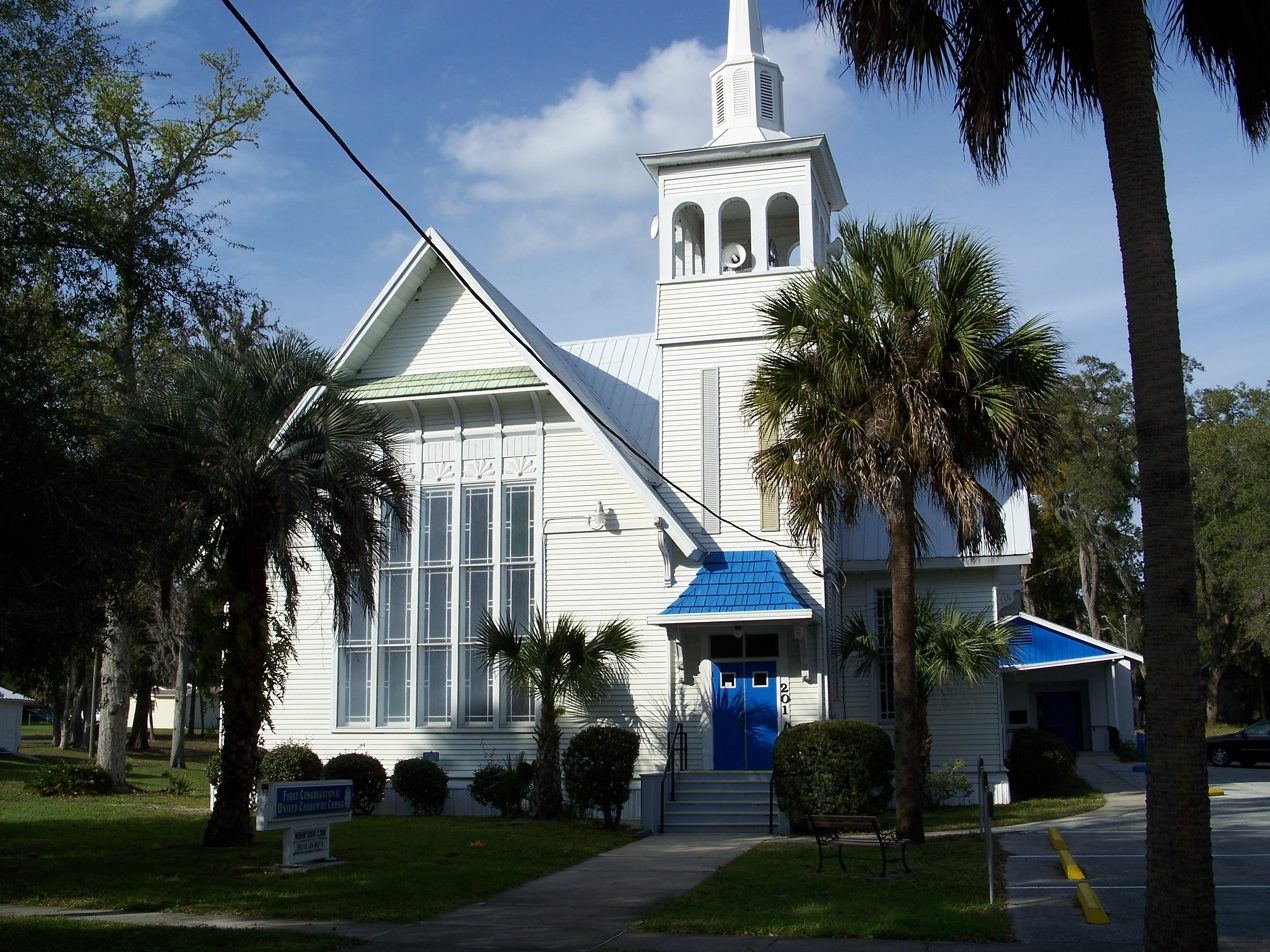
First Congregational United Church of Christ, in the district

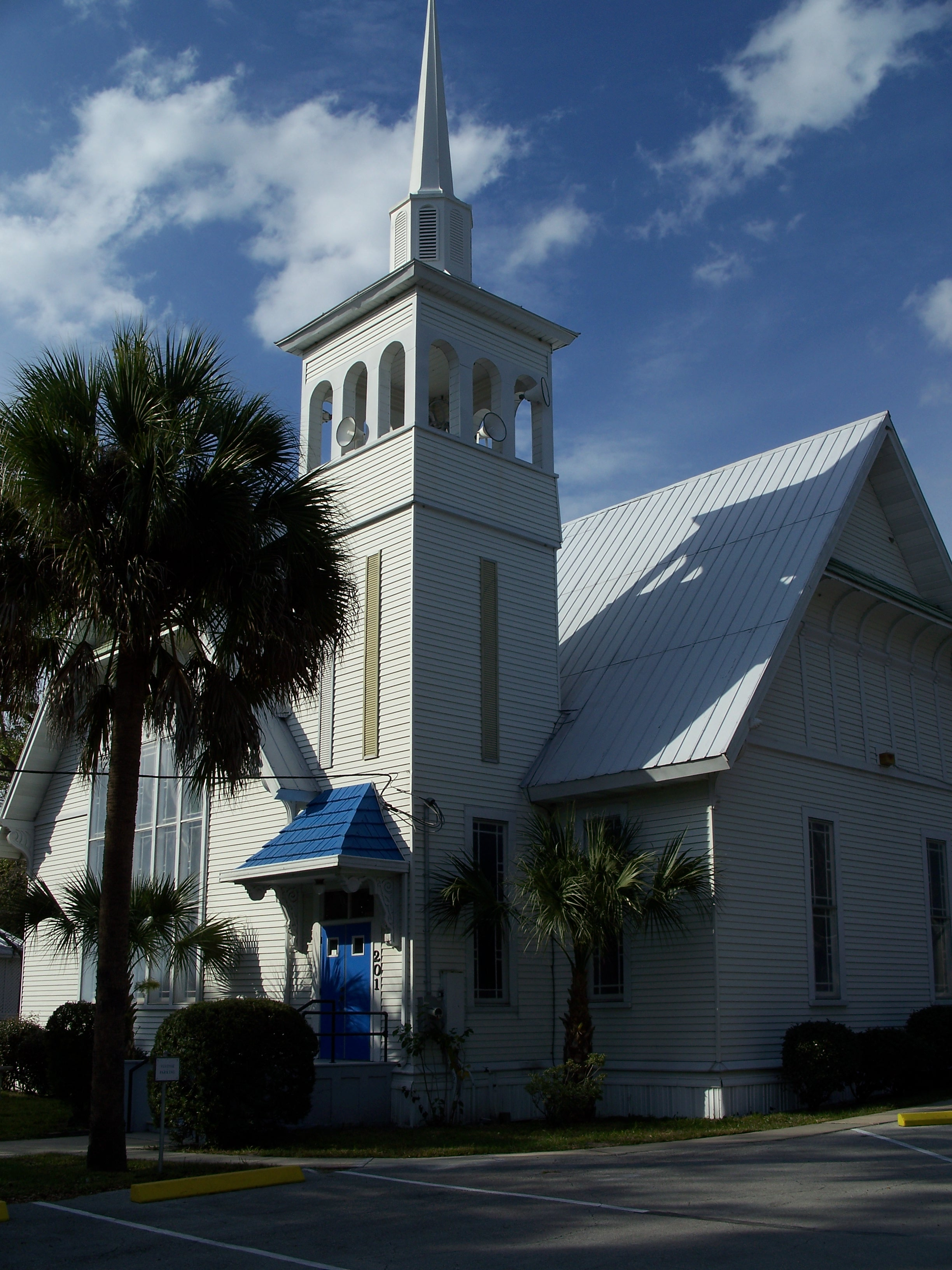
First Congregational United Church of Christ, in the district
