= Danny Kelley =

American stock car racing driver

- Born: 1964 (age 61–62) Orange City, Florida, U.S.

ARCA Bondo/Mar-Hyde Series
- Years active: 1985-1996
- Teams: No. 74, D.K. Racing
- Starts: 8
- Wins: 0
- Poles: 0

Danny Kelley (born 1964 in Orange City, Florida) is an American stock car racing driver. He is a former competitor in the ARCA Racing Series.

== Career ==
Kelley began his racing career in central Florida, racing Sportsman and Four Cylinder cars at tracks including New Smyrna Speedway. He moved to ARCA competition in 1985, posting his best career finish in the series, 14th, at Atlanta International Raceway in that year. Kelly raced in the series' biggest event, run as part of Speedweeks at Daytona International Speedway, in 1986, 1987 and 1989; in 1988 he constructed a new race shop in DeLand, Florida for his D.K. Racing team. Kelley competed primarily in the ARCA series' superspeedway races, at Daytona International Speedway and Talladega Superspeedway; he failed to qualify for the ARCA race at Daytona International Speedway in 1993 and 1994, before making his final ARCA Racing Series start in 1995 at the track, finishing 26th. He would attempt to qualify for the 1996 ARCA event at Daytona, failing to make the race; it was his final attempted start in major-league stock car racing.
