= Pine Ridge High School =

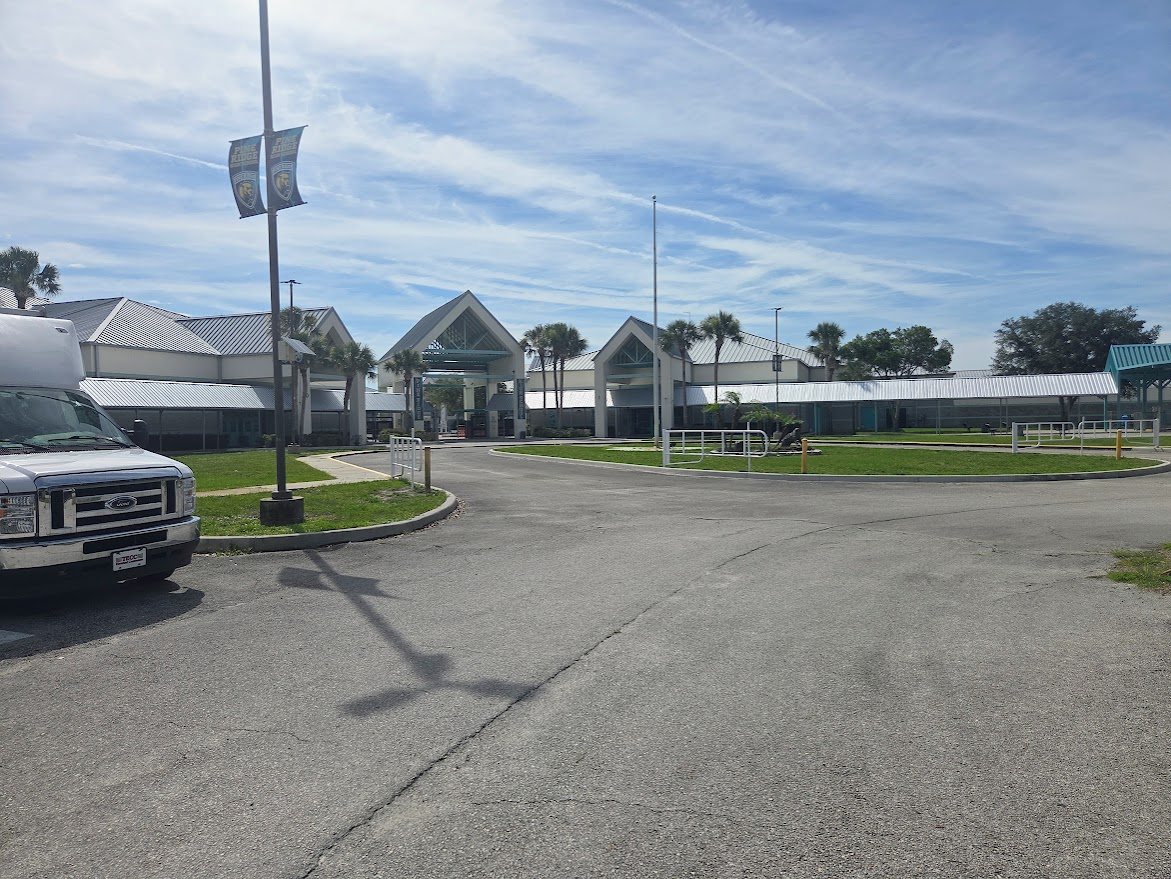
- Main entrance in June 2026

Location
- 926 Howland Boulevard; Deltona, (Volusia County), Florida 32738; United States; 28.887155°N 81.163791°W

Information
- Type: Public high school
- School district: Volusia County Schools
- Principal: Julian Doster
- Teaching staff: 80.00 (FTE)
- Enrollment: 1,630 (2023-2024)
- Student to teacher ratio: 20.38
- Colors: Teal, black and gold
- Nickname: Panthers
- Website: www.pineridgehighschool.com

Pine Ridge High School is a public high school located in Deltona, Florida. First classes commenced on September 6, 1994 and is located at 926 Howland Blvd, near Florida State Road 415. Pine Ridge High School's team mascot is the Panther, and its colors are teal, black, and gold.

Pine Ridge has a twin school, Atlantic High School. Both schools were built on the same design but by different contractors. Both campuses have the iconic courtyard clock, however the one at Pine Ridge stopped some years ago and the clock has since been covered with signs that feature the schools popular Panther P logo. The principal for the school is Julian Doster.

== Academics and curriculum ==
Similar to many schools in Volusia County, Pine Ridge High School has specialized academies that have been successful in helping students to graduate with unique skills and certifications in Culinary Arts and EMS. They include the Academy of Agriculture Education and Communication, Veterinary Assisting, Academy of Sports Science and Emergency Medical Services, and STEM. Daytona State College courses are available on Pine Ridge campus, as well as Advanced Placement courses. The school has its own student-supported early childhood/preschool program called The Pee Wee Panthers. The school has an Air Force JROTC program. Pine Ridge offers AVID, ESOL, and OJT as well. The school, as of the 2021–2022 school year, offers Russian and Spanish as foreign languages. There are many courses available to support students with unique needs in the ESE and ESOL departments. Pine Ridge has a variety of programs available to students in the performing arts such as chorus, band, drama and dance. There are also fine arts as well as career and technology courses.

== Extracurricular activities ==
Pine Ridge has many activities and clubs in which students can participate. Some popular ones are the Earth First, FCA, FFA, Health Occupation Students of America, Key Club, Mu Alpha Theta, National Honor Society, International Thespian Society, SGA, S.A.D.D, and Science National Honors Society.

The Pine Ridge High School Bands consist of marching band, concert band, and jazz band. The marching band provides entertainment during football games by playing stand tunes during the game and performing on the field during half-time. It also plays at pep rallies, marching competitions, and parades. The concert band performs several times throughout the year. Performances include winter and spring concerts as well as MPA. The jazz band performs at various functions including the Lakeside Jazz Festival in Port Orange, Florida.

== Athletics ==
Pine Ridge has fall, winter, and spring athletic teams as well as a football stadium and soccer and baseball fields on campus. Pine Ridge shares a rivalry with neighboring Deltona High. It has been dubbed the "Battle of the Boulevard". Varsity soccer were district champions in the 2012–2013 season.

== Air Force Junior Reserve Officers' Training Corps ==
Pine Ridge High School has an award-winning Air Force Junior Reserve Officers' Training Corps program: designated a Distinguished Unit by the USAF since 2004; recognized as an Outstanding High School Leadership Training Program by College Admissions Officers; led by teachers with USAF Advanced Instructor Certification. The guiding principle for the Cadet Group is to "Follow, Lead, Succeed." The FL-941 Cadet Group meets and fulfills this challenge daily by planning, organizing, and running all cadet operations. Cadet activities are numerous, and include academic goal-setting campaigns, community service projects, parades, field training exercises, color guard, drill competitions, school-wide inter-murals, and more. As of December 9, 2018, Pine Ridge AFJROTC is now known as a Distinguished Unit with Merit.
