= Dennis Mulder =

2nd Mayor of Deltona
- In office November 8, 2005 – November 2, 2010
- Preceded by: John Masiarcyzk, Sr.
- Succeeded by: John Masiarcyzk, Sr.

Personal details
- Born: Dennis E. Mulder; July 8, 1978 (age 48) Washington, North Carolina
- Party: Democratic
- Spouse: Heather Mulder
- Children: 1
- Profession: Business owner, politician
- Website: City Council website

Dennis Mulder (born July 8, 1978) is an American politician and former mayor of Deltona, Florida.

== Early life ==
Mulder was born in Washington, North Carolina on July 8, 1978. Graduated from Deltona High School. He was formerly a small business owner and founded the Deltona Tennis Association in 2000, before becoming mayor of Deltona.

== Political career ==
In 2005, Mulder announced his candidacy to become the mayor of the city of Deltona to replace the incumbent mayor John Masiarcyzk, Sr., who was elected as Deltona's first mayor and was ineligible to seek reelection. He won the general election later that year by receiving 58.02% of the vote, and defeating City Commissioner Doug Horn, a resident of Deltona exactly twice Mulder's age, who received 41.98% of the vote. Muldar became the youngest elected official in the city’s history. He served as mayor from November 8, 2005, until November 2, 2010. In 2010, Dennis Mulder resigned from office, stating that he will not be seeking reelection. Former mayor John Masiarcyzk, Sr. ran, and defeated his opponent, then City Commissioner and Vice Mayor David Santiago, in the 2010 general election.

In 2012, legislative districts were redrawn, and incumbent state representative Dorothy Hukill was unable to seek re-election, creating an open seat in the 27th District, which stretches from Oak Hill to DeBary. Mulder announced that year that he would be running for that Florida House seat as the Democratic candidate. Mulder was to face off against the former Deltona City Commissioner and Vice Mayor David Santiago, who was running as the Republican candidate. In August, he abruptly dropped out of the race, citing his son's deteriorating health. The Volusia County Democratic Party was forced to find a replacement, eventually voting to nominate their Chairman, Phil Giorno, who previously served as a member of the Volusia County Council, over DeBary mayor Bob Garcia and former congressional candidate Nicholas Ruiz. Ultimately, Santiago was elected over Giorno, winning his first term in the legislature with 55% of the vote to Giorno's 45%. In 2016, Mulder was looked at as one of the four possible candidates to run for mayor of DeBary, Florida in the special election to replace the incumbent mayor Clint P. Johnson who was being ousted from office by the city council. He said it is on his mind but that he is "nowhere close to making any kind of decision." He later did not run for office in the special election, and former mayor Bob Garcia won the special election that year.

== Personal life ==
He currently lives Debary, Florida with his wife Heather and his son Nicko.
