= Trinity Christian Academy (Deltona, Florida) =

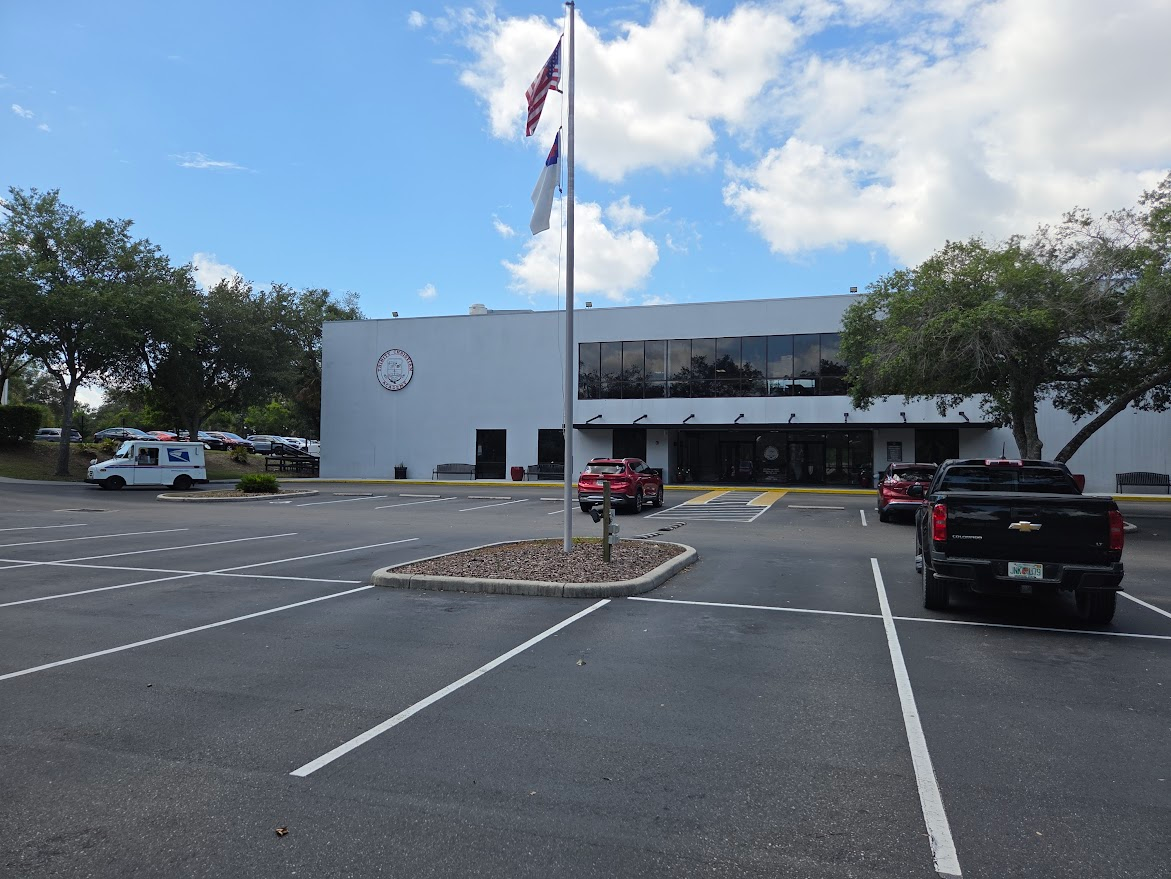

Location
- 875 Elkcam Boulevard; Deltona, Florida; United States; 28.9247°N 81.2532°W

Information
- Type: Private
- Established: 1985
- Faculty: 31.0 (on FTE basis)
- Grades: PreK–12
- Enrollment: 465 (2007–08)
- Student to teacher ratio: 15.0:1
- Colors: Maroon and gray
- Mascot: Eagles
- Website: www.trinitychristianacademy.com

Trinity Christian Academy (TCA) is a private, non-denominational Christian school ministry of the Trinity Assembly of God church in Deltona, Florida. It enrolls students from preschool through 12th grade.

Trinity's baseball team won the state championship in 2009, 2010, and 2012.

== Alumni ==
- Austin Barber, college football offensive tackle for the Florida Gators
- Andrew Brown, pitcher in the MLB.
- Paxton Lynch, quarterback, was selected in the first round of the 2016 NFL draft by the Denver Broncos.
- Gerard Ross, former NFL cornerback for the Seattle Seahawks
- Derek West, baseball player
