= David Santiago =

American politician

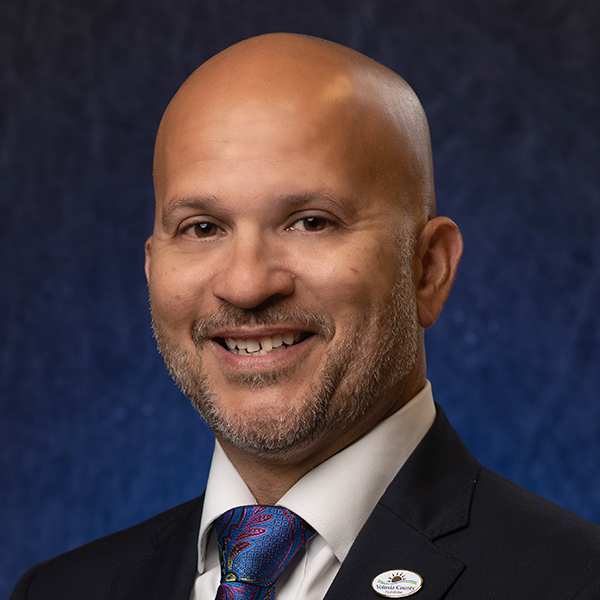

Member of the Volusia County Council from the 5th district
- Incumbent
- Assumed office January 1, 2023
- Preceded by: Fred Lowry

Member of the Florida House of Representatives from the 27th district
- In office November 6, 2012 – November 3, 2020
- Preceded by: Redistricted
- Succeeded by: Webster Barnaby

Member of the Deltona City Commission from the 2nd district
- In office November 4, 2003 – November 6, 2007
- Preceded by: Ken Runge
- Succeeded by: Herb Zischkau

Personal details
- Born: December 14, 1970 (age 55) Dover, New Jersey
- Party: Republican
- Spouse: Emma Santiago
- Children: Kristina, Gabriela, David
- Profession: Financial manager

Military service
- Branch/service: United States Army Reserve
- Years of service: 1988-1996

David Santiago (born December 14, 1970) is an American politician who has served as a member of the Volusia County Council since 2023. A member of the Republican Party, he previously served in the Florida House of Representatives from 2012 to 2020 and on the Deltona City Commission from 2003 to 2007.

== History ==
Santiago was born in Dover, New Jersey, and joined the United States Army Reserve after graduating from Brentwood High School in Brentwood, New York. He was honorably discharged eight years later. Santiago moved to the state of Florida in 1991 after his father-in-law gave him a house in Deltona, Florida as a wedding gift. Following his move, Santiago worked in insurance and real estate, and served on the Deltona, Florida City Commission from 2003 to 2007.

== Deltona City Commission ==
Santiago served as a city commissioner of District 2 and vice mayor in the city of Deltona. In 2010 incumbent mayor Dennis Mulder decided not to seek reelection. Santiago ran against two opponents in the primaries (Robert Desmond and former mayor John Masiarcyzk Sr.). Santiago was defeated by Masiarcyzk in the general election with Masiarczyk receiving 58.52% of votes and Santiago 41.48%.

== Florida House of Representatives ==
In 2012, the legislative districts were redrawn, and incumbent State Representative Dorothy Hukill was unable to seek re-election, creating an open seat in the 27th District, which stretches from Oak Hill to DeBary. Santiago ran in the open seat and faced George Trovato in the Republican primary, whom he easily defeated with 65% of the vote. In the general election, Santiago was initially set to face Dennis Mulder, the Democratic nominee and the former Mayor of Deltona. The Florida Democratic Party was targeting the district because it has a substantial registration advantage, but in August, Mulder abruptly dropped out of the race, citing his son's deteriorating health. The Volusia County Democratic Party was forced to find a replacement, eventually voting to nominate their Chairman, Phil Giorno, who previously served as a member of the Volusia County Council, over DeBary Mayor Bob Garcia and former congressional candidate Nicholas Ruiz. Santiago declared, "The race hasn't changed. My campaign has never been about my opponent. It's about getting Florida back on track." Ultimately, Santiago was elected over Giorno, winning his first term in the legislature with 55% of the votes to Giorno's 45%.

Santiago was term-limited from the House in 2020, after serving four terms.

=== 2020 Volusia County Tax Collector campaign ===
In 2020, Santiago was a candidate for the newly established position of tax collector of Volusia County. He was defeated in the Republican primary by Will Roberts.

== Volusia County Council ==
In November 2022, Santiago was elected to the Volusia County Council from the 5th district, succeeding Fred Lowry.
