= John Masiarcyzk Sr. =

Mayor of Deltona, Florida

John Masiarcyzk

1st and 3rd Mayor of Deltona
- In office November 2, 2010 – November 6, 2018
- Preceded by: Dennis Mulder
- Succeeded by: Heidi Herzberg
- In office November 7, 1995 – November 8, 2005
- Preceded by: Office established
- Succeeded by: Dennis Mulder

Personal details
- Born: August 18, 1945 (age 81) Detroit, Michigan, U.S.

Military service
- Branch/service: United States Navy

John Masiarcyzk Sr. is the former and inaugural mayor of the city of Deltona, Florida.

== Early life ==
Masiarcyzk was born in Detroit, Michigan. He enlisted in the United States Navy after graduating from high school. He was stationed at Naval Air Station Sanford in Sanford, Florida. Following his service in the Vietnam War, he later retired from the US Navy and moved to Deltona, Florida in 1968.

== Political career ==
In 1995, Masiarcyzk ran to become the mayor of the city of Deltona, which he would serve as from 1995 to 2005. He ran against Roberto "Bob" Garcia in the general election that year. Masiarcyzk was ineligible to run for re-election in 2005 due to term limits. In 2005, Dennis Mulder declared his candidacy to succeed Masiarcyzk as mayor and later won that year defeating City Commissioner Doug Horn. In 2010, Masiarcyzk won election again to replace the incumbent mayor Dennis Mulder who resigned from office not seeking re-election. He ran against then Commissioner/Vice Mayor David Santiago in the general election. Masiarcyzk won re-election again as mayor defeating his challenger, Zenaida Denizac, who was a commissioner of the city in the year of 2014. Due to term limits, Masiarcyzk was once again ineligible to run for re-election in 2018 for having served two consecutive terms in office since his return to the mayoral office in 2010.
