= Dickinson Memorial Library and Park =

- U.S. National Register of Historic Places
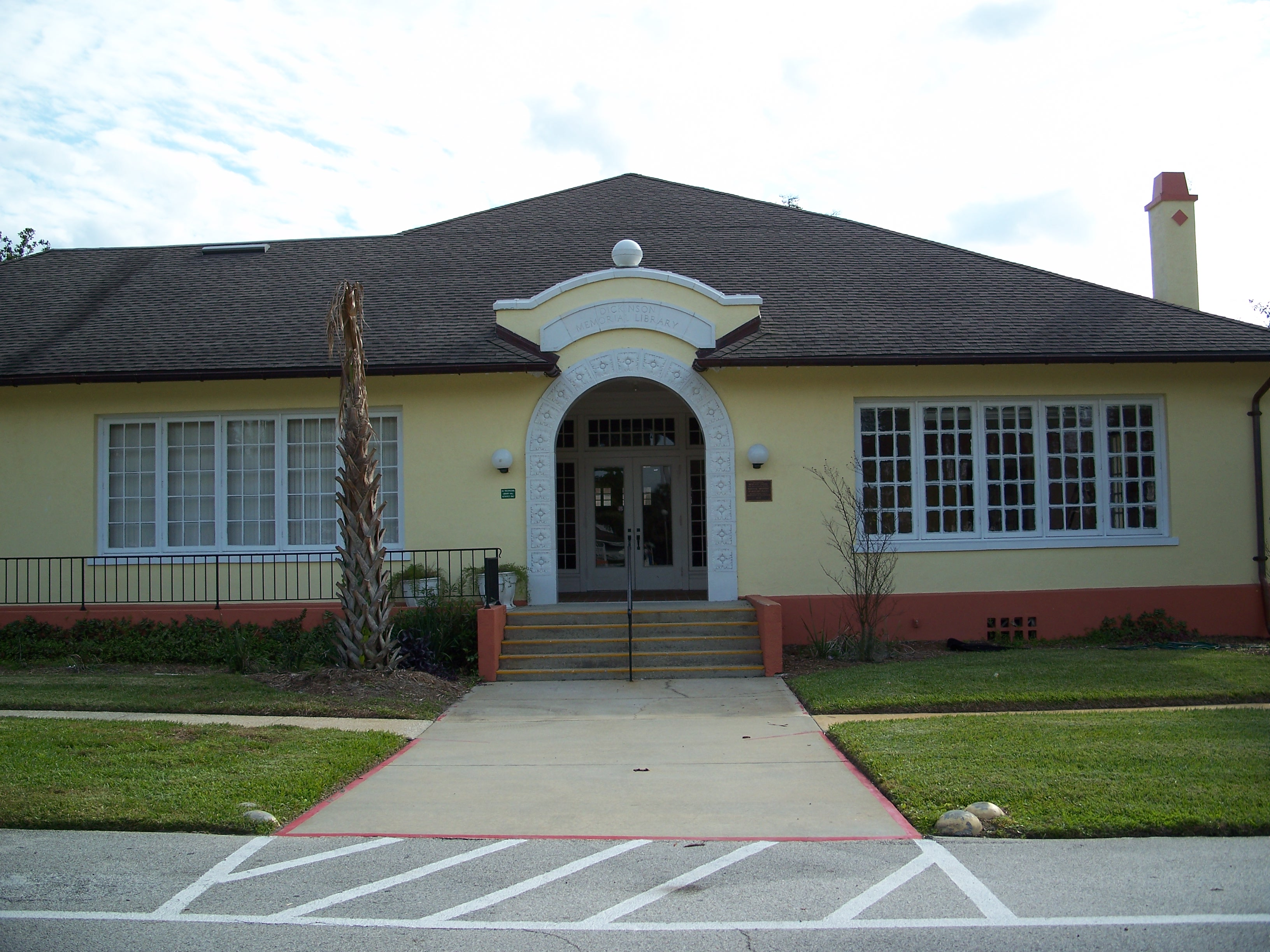

- Location within Volusia County
- Location: Orange City, FloridaFlorida
- Coordinates: 28°56′52″N 81°17′55″W
- Built: 1919
- Architect: J. H. Bates, Francis Miller
- Architectural style: Masonry Vernacular
- NRHP reference No.: 95000020
- Added to NRHP: February 8, 1995

The Dickinson Memorial Library and Park is a historic site in Orange City, Florida, United States. The library is located at 148 Albertus Way. The park is located on the corner of East Graves Avenue and U.S. Hwy 17–92. It contains tables and park benches around a gazebo and two water fountains. It is adjacent to the library. Every Friday from 8 AM to 1 PM you can find a farmer's market located in the park, with a wide selection of fruits, vegetables, plants, baked goods and other great items. The park is also used for various City and community events including an annual summer music in the park program. It was added to the National Register of Historic Places in 1995.

The library is now known as the Orange City Library, and is part of the Deltona Region of the Volusia County Public Library.
