= Orange City Town Hall =

- U.S. National Register of Historic Places
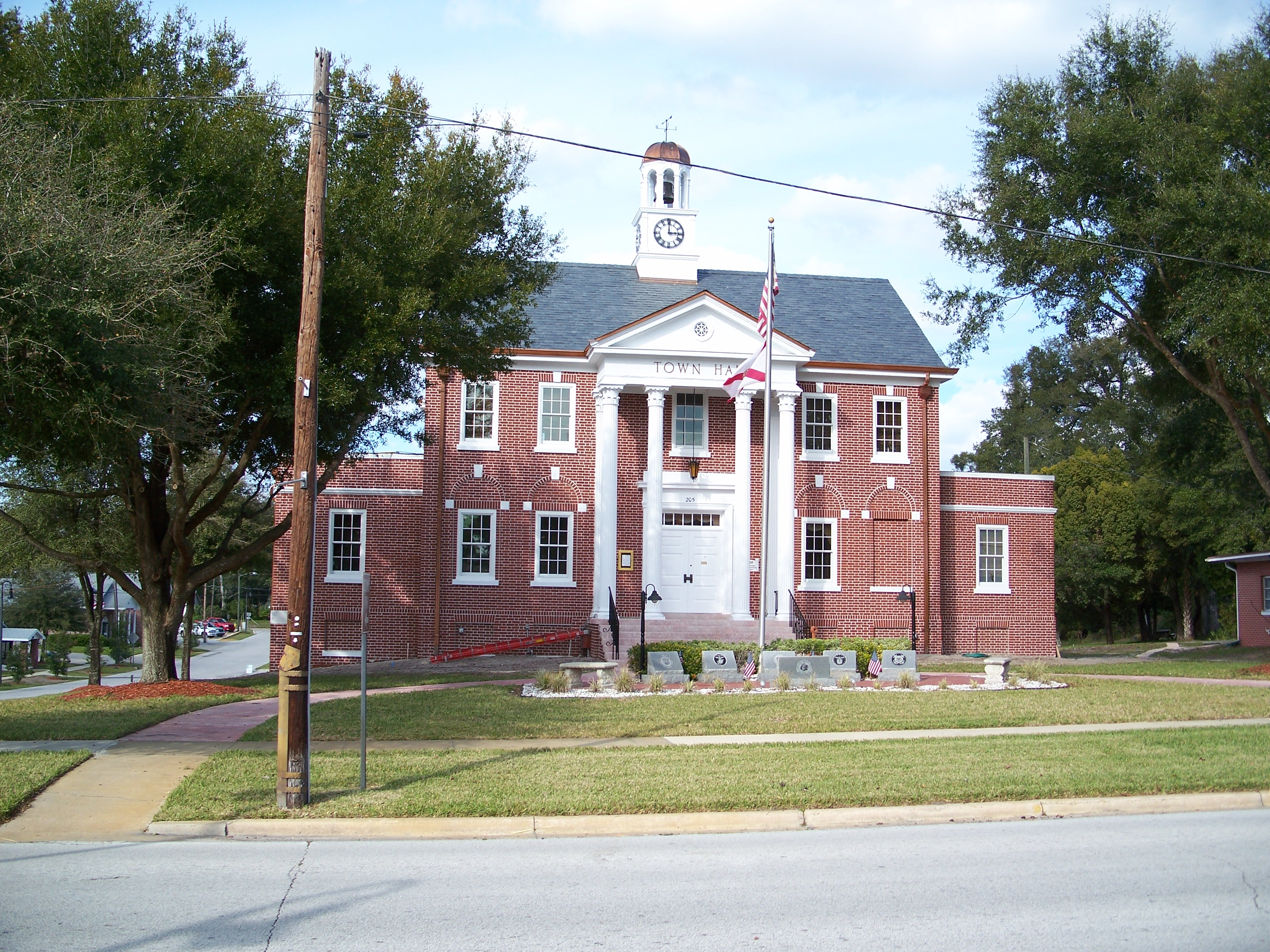

- Location within Volusia County
- Location: Orange City, Florida United States
- Coordinates: 28°56′56″N 81°17′52″W
- Architectural style: Classical Revival
- NRHP reference No.: 02000493
- Added to NRHP: May 16, 2002

The Orange City Town Hall is a historic site in Orange City, Florida, United States. It is located at 205 East Graves Avenue. On May 16, 2002, it was added to the U.S. National Register of Historic Places.
