= Chad Brown (basketball) =

American basketball player (born 1996)

No. 22 – Pallacanestro Cantù
- Position: Center
- League: Lega Basket Serie A

Personal information
- Born: September 6, 1996 (age 30) Deltona, Florida, U.S.
- Listed height: 6 ft 9 in (2.06 m)
- Listed weight: 245 lb (111 kg)

Career information
- High school: Deltona (Deltona, Florida)
- College: UCF (2015–2019)
- NBA draft: 2019: undrafted
- Playing career: 2019–present

Career history
- 2019–2020: Texas Legends
- 2020–2021: Charilaos Trikoupis
- 2021: Gießen 46ers
- 2021: Guelph Nighthawks
- 2021–2022: Peristeri
- 2022: Merkezefendi
- 2022–2023: Hapoel Gilboa Galil
- 2023: Uralmash Yekaterinburg
- 2023–2024: Apollon Patras
- 2024: King Szczecin
- 2024–2025: Peristeri
- 2025: Manama Club
- 2025: Titanes del Distrito
- 2025: Trepça
- 2025–2026: Satria Muda Bandung
- 2026: Maccabi Ramat Gan
- 2026–present: Pallacanestro Cantù

Career highlights
- Greek League rebounding leader (2024); Greek League blocks leader (2024)
- Stats at Basketball Reference

Chad Teron Brown (born September 6, 1996) is an American professional basketball player for Pallacanestro Cantù of the Lega Basket Serie A (LBA). He played college basketball for the UCF Knights.

== Early life and education ==
Brown attended Deltona High School at Deltona, Florida. A four star prospect by Scout.com, Brown averaged 14.7 points, 15 rebounds and 9.4 blocks per game as a senior.

== College career ==
Brown played for UCF Knights from 2015 to 2019. As a junior, he averaged 5.2 points and 4.6 rebounds per game, shooting 51 percent from the field, while playing along with Tacko Fall. The same season, he led the team in blocks, averaging 1.1 blocks per game. During his senior season, he averaged 4.5 points, 5 rebounds, and 1 block per game.

== Professional career ==
After going undrafted in the 2019 NBA draft, Brown joined the Dallas Mavericks, on October 17, 2019, but was waived after two days. On October 26, 2020, he was acquired by the Texas Legends. In 42 games, he averaged 5.4 points, 6.2 rebounds and 0.9 blocks per game.

On August 6, 2020, he joined Charilaos Trikoupis of the Greek Basket League. In 10 games with the Greek club, he averaged 12.5 points and 8.9 rebounds per contest. After his impressive tenure with Trikoupis, Brown was bought out by Gießen 46ers of the Basketball Bundesliga. In 12 games with the German club, he averaged 4.3 points and 3.1 rebounds per contest. Brown then finished the season off with the Guelph Nighthawks of the Canadian Elite Basketball League, averaging 13.4 points, 10.6 rebounds, and 2.8 blocks per game.

On July 27, 2021, Brown signed with Peristeri of the Greek Basket League and the Basketball Champions League. In 24 league games, he averaged 5.6 points, 7.1 rebounds and 0.9 blocks in 18 minutes per contest.

On July 4, 2022, Brown signed with Merkezefendi of the Turkish Basketbol Süper Ligi. On November 12, 2022, he moved to Hapoel Gilboa Galil of the Israeli Basketball Premier League.

In July 2023, Brown signed with Russian club Uralmash Yekaterinburg of the VTB United League. On October 18, 2023, he moved back to Greece for Apollon Patras. In 25 games, he averaged 12.3 points, 9.2 rebounds and 1.2 blocks in 29 minutes of play.

On July 17, 2024, he signed with Wilki Morskie Szczecin of the Polish Basketball League (PLK).

On December 28, 2024, Brown returned to Peristeri.

On August 14, 2025, Brown signed with Trepça of the Kosovo Superleague.
