= Deltona, Florida =

City in Florida, United States

- City
- City of Deltona
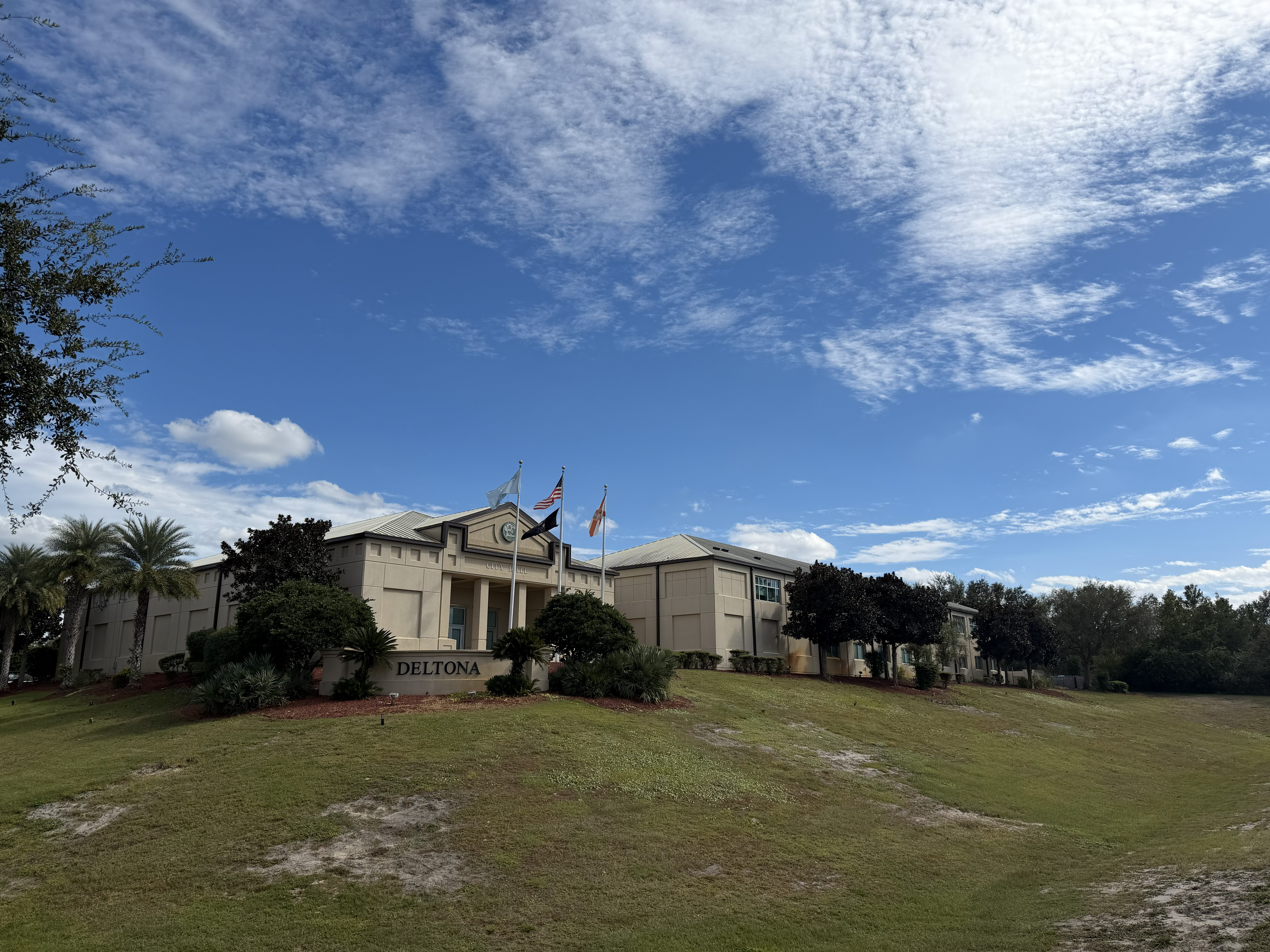
- Deltona City Hall

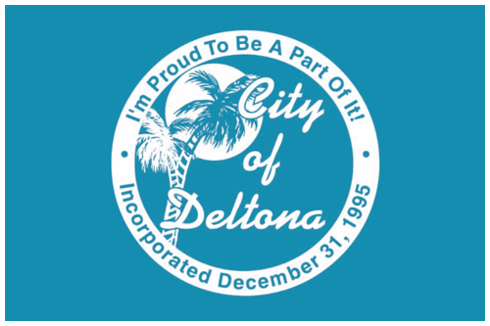
- Flag Seal
- Motto: "I'm Proud To Be A Part Of It!"
- Location in Volusia County and the state of Florida
- Coordinates: 28°53′10″N 81°12′55″W
- Country: United States
- State: Florida
- County: Volusia
- Established: November 18, 1962, as Deltona Lakes
- Incorporated: December 31, 1995, as the City of Deltona

Government
  - Type: Commission–manager
  - Mayor: William J. Rodriguez

Area
  - City: 40.85 sq mi (105.79 km^{2})
  - Land: 37.32 sq mi (96.67 km^{2})
  - Water: 3.52 sq mi (9.12 km^{2}) 8.5%
- Elevation: 46 ft (14 m)

Population (2020)
  - City: 93,692
  - Estimate (2025): 100,267
  - Density: 2,510.2/sq mi (969.21/km^{2})
  - Urban: 210,712 (183rd U.S.)
  - Urban density: 1,933.4/sq mi (746.5/km^{2})
  - Metro: 668,921 (88th U.S.)
- Demonym: Deltonian
- Time zone: UTC−5 (EST)
  - Summer (DST): UTC−4 (EDT)
- ZIP codes: 32725, 32738
- Area codes: 321, 386, 407 and 689
- FIPS code: 12-17200
- GNIS feature ID: 2404213
- Website: www.deltonafl.gov

Deltona is a city in Volusia County, Florida, United States. It is located on the northern shore of Lake Monroe. As of the 2020 census, the city population was 93,692. It is a principal city of the Deltona–Daytona Beach–Ormond Beach metropolitan area, which was home to an estimated 685,344 people in 2021. It is the second largest city in the Greater Orlando combined statistical area.

The city, previously known as Deltona Lakes, was originally established as a planned residential community, and was master-planned and developed by the General Development Corporation and the Mackle Brothers. Since its opening in 1962, the community rapidly grew from a small subdivision to becoming one of largest cities in Central Florida by the end of the 20th century, largely in part by the Mackle Brothers' worldwide marketing efforts showcasing small low maintenance homes offered at affordable prices. The city is mostly residential, and primarily serves as a commuter town for the nearby cities of Orlando and Daytona Beach, as well as its surrounding communities.

== Etymology ==
Deltona is a portmanteau of DeLand and Daytona Beach.

== History ==
The area of current Deltona and surrounding communities was originally inhabited by nomadic Timucuans, who found fish and fresh water to be plentiful in the area. After Florida became a state in 1845, steamboats began to make regular trips up the St. Johns River to Lake Monroe. George Sauls, a former secret agent for the Confederacy during the American Civil War, along with his wife Adeline and six children, were the first settlers in the area in 1859. The area was located approximately three miles (4.8 km) north of the community of Osteen. Sauls' homestead caught fire in 1972, but it would eventually be designated as a historical site by the Volusia County Historical Commission, and the street, originally named Barranca, was renamed George Sauls Street in 1977. It was decommissioned as a historical site in 2000, and its site marker has since been relocated to the nearby Osteen Cemetery, with maintenance overseen by the Volusia County Preservation Board.

What now constitutes the city was originally developed in 1962 as Deltona Lakes by Elliott, Robert and Frank Mackle as a planned residential community through the purchase of 17,203 acres of land. The development would open to potential land buyers on November 18, 1962, and included out-parcels for drainage retention, apartments, churches, parks, commercial centers, an industrial area, a community center, and a golf course. Deltona Lakes was heavily marketed throughout the United States, including Ohio, Illinois, Indiana and Michigan. Sales representatives would also market in places such as Germany, Puerto Rico, Latin America and the Far East.

By November 1965, just one year after its opening, Deltona Lakes grew to a population of nearly 1,600, nearly 1,000 homes were built or under construction, and had more than 120 miles of paved roads or roads being surfaced. By September 1966, Deltona Lakes came to attract more families, growing to a population of 2,413, and a student enrollment of more than 200, resulting in soaring property sales of up to US$60 million. In April 1967, more than 30 civic, social, charitable and fraternal clubs would form, including a civic association, a men's and women's golf association, a shuffle board club, and a bicycle club. By 1970, Deltona Lakes had an estimated population of 4,868 and would continue to grow in population throughout the 1970s and 1980s, reaching a population of 51,828 by 1990.

The residents of Deltona Lakes attempted to incorporate it as a city in 1987 and 1990, but were not successful until 1995. A city charter was adopted on September 9, 1995, and a seven-member city commission was elected. Deltona Lakes was incorporated as a city on December 31, 1995, with its name shortened to Deltona.

By 2000, the city grew to a population of 69,543 people, surpassing Daytona Beach as the most populous city in Volusia County. After the city's incorporation, regular city meetings would be held on the second floor of the now-defunct SouthTrust Bank building on Deltona Boulevard, until the first city hall began construction in 2001. The US$7 million project would complete for opening on March 16, 2002. On December 3, 2002, ground broke for the development of the Deltona satellite campus of Daytona State College (then known as Daytona Beach Community College), adjacent to Deltona City Hall. The campus opened in August 2004.

On August 6, 2004, four men broke into a home and beat six people and a dog to death with baseball bats, making it the deadliest mass murder in Volusia County history.

In recent years, new measures have been taken by city officials to begin attracting new businesses and industries into the city. Specially zoned areas in the city have been designated to allow for the development of upscale office facilities, light industrial space, health care facilities, warehousing and distribution facilities, commercial recreational facilities, and lodging services.

== Geography and climate ==
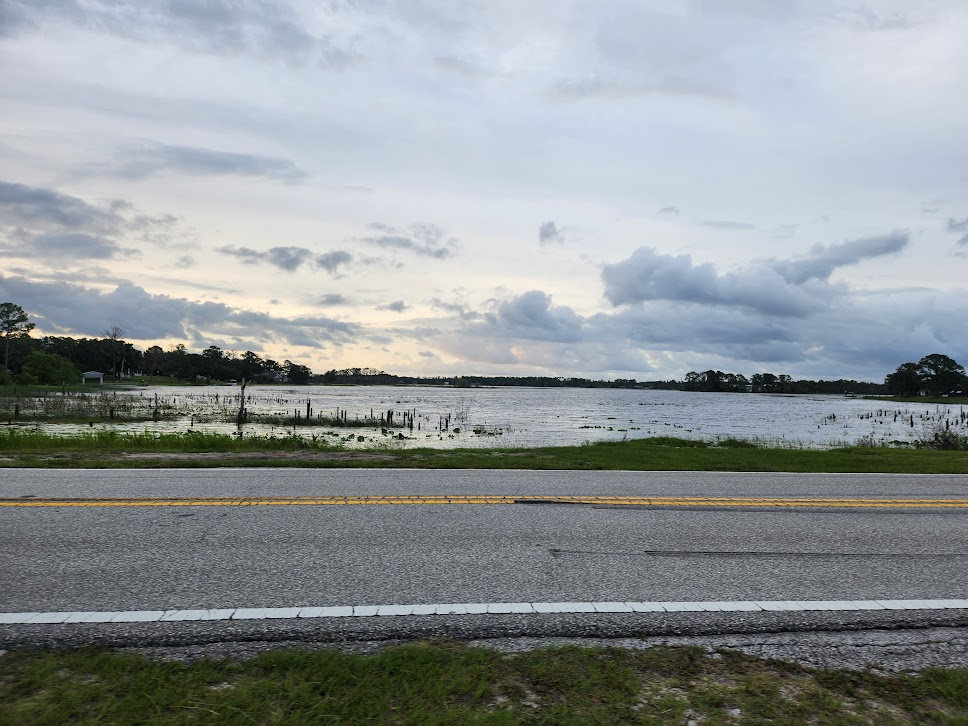
Lake Dupont in Deltona

Deltona is located in southwestern Volusia County in Central Florida approximately 25 miles (40 km) inland from the Atlantic Ocean, halfway between Daytona Beach and Orlando. It is bordered by Lake Helen and Cassadaga on the north, DeLand on the northwest, Orange City on the west, DeBary on the southwest, Enterprise on the south, and Osteen on the southeast. It is included in the Deltona–Daytona Beach–Ormond Beach Metropolitan Statistical Area and the larger Orlando–Lakeland–Deltona Combined Statistical Area.

The majority of the land in the city is of karst topography, characterized by rolling hills and an abundant amount of lakes. The St. Johns River passes through Lake Monroe, directly south of the city. The United States Geological Survey lists the city's elevation at 33 feet (10 m) above sea level at a point near Deltona's geographic center. Elevations range from 20 feet (6.1 m) to 112 feet (34 m) above sea level. As of 2010, according to the United States Census Bureau, the city has a total area of 41.1 square miles (106.4 km^{2}), 37.5 square miles (97.1 km^{2}) of which is land and 3.5 square miles (9.1 km^{2}) of which is water.

Deltona's climate is classified as a humid subtropical climate in the Cfa Köppen climate classification, meaning it typically has hot, humid summers and mild winters. The record high temperature is 103 °F (39 °C) recorded in July 1998, with a record low of 19 °F (−7 °C) recorded in January 1985. Rainfall averages around 53 inches (1,300 mm) a year, with the wettest months being June through September. The hurricane season lasts from June 1 to November 30, with September as the most susceptible month to hurricanes. The most powerful hurricane to strike Deltona since its incorporation was Charley in 2004, during which the eye of the hurricane passed directly over the city; that same year, the city would also suffer from the effects of hurricanes Frances and Jeanne.

Climate data for Deltona, Florida
| Month | Jan | Feb | Mar | Apr | May | Jun | Jul | Aug | Sep | Oct | Nov | Dec | Year |
|---|---|---|---|---|---|---|---|---|---|---|---|---|---|
| Record high °F (°C) | 89 (32) | 89 (32) | 92 (33) | 96 (36) | 100 (38) | 102 (39) | 103 (39) | 100 (38) | 98 (37) | 96 (36) | 92 (33) | 88 (31) | 103 (39) |
| Mean daily maximum °F (°C) | 70 (21) | 72 (22) | 77 (25) | 81 (27) | 87 (31) | 90 (32) | 92 (33) | 92 (33) | 89 (32) | 83 (28) | 78 (26) | 72 (22) | 82 (28) |
| Mean daily minimum °F (°C) | 47 (8) | 49 (9) | 54 (12) | 57 (14) | 63 (17) | 69 (21) | 71 (22) | 71 (22) | 70 (21) | 64 (18) | 57 (14) | 50 (10) | 60 (16) |
| Record low °F (°C) | 19 (−7) | 25 (−4) | 27 (−3) | 36 (2) | 45 (7) | 52 (11) | 60 (16) | 64 (18) | 52 (11) | 39 (4) | 30 (−1) | 19 (−7) | 19 (−7) |
| Average precipitation inches (mm) | 2.88 (73) | 2.96 (75) | 3.80 (97) | 2.55 (65) | 3.53 (90) | 6.41 (163) | 7.02 (178) | 7.23 (184) | 5.88 (149) | 3.56 (90) | 2.96 (75) | 2.53 (64) | 51.31 (1,303) |
Source: The Weather Channel

== Demographics ==
Historical population
| Census | Pop. | Note | %± |
|---|---|---|---|
| 1970 | 4,868 | | — |
| 1980 | 15,710 | | 222.7% |
| 1990 | 50,828 | | 223.5% |
| 2000 | 69,543 | | 36.8% |
| 2010 | 85,182 | | 22.5% |
| 2020 | 93,692 | | 10.0% |
| 2025 (est.) | 100,267 | | 7.0% |
U.S. Decennial Census

=== Racial and ethnic composition ===
Deltona, Florida – Racial and ethnic composition Note: the US Census treats Hispanic/Latino as an ethnic category. This table excludes Latinos from the racial categories and assigns them to a separate category. Hispanics/Latinos may be of any race.
| Race / Ethnicity (NH = Non-Hispanic) | Pop 2000 | Pop 2010 | Pop 2020 | % 2000 | % 2010 | % 2020 |
|---|---|---|---|---|---|---|
| White (NH) | 50,540 | 48,502 | 42,893 | 72.67% | 56.94% | 45.78% |
| Black or African American (NH) | 4,478 | 8,058 | 9,837 | 6.44% | 9.46% | 10.50% |
| Native American or Alaska Native (NH) | 203 | 236 | 200 | 0.29% | 0.28% | 0.21% |
| Asian (NH) | 629 | 988 | 1,328 | 0.90% | 1.16% | 1.42% |
| Pacific Islander or Native Hawaiian (NH) | 28 | 29 | 61 | 0.04% | 0.03% | 0.07% |
| Some other race (NH) | 73 | 180 | 533 | 0.10% | 0.21% | 0.57% |
| Mixed race or Multiracial (NH) | 845 | 1,455 | 3,581 | 1.22% | 1.71% | 3.82% |
| Hispanic or Latino (any race) | 12,747 | 25,734 | 35,259 | 18.33% | 30.21% | 37.63% |
| Total | 69,543 | 85,182 | 93,692 | 100.00% | 100.00% | 100.00% |

=== 2020 census ===
As of the 2020 census, Deltona had a population of 93,692. The median age was 40.3 years. 22.0% of residents were under the age of 18 and 16.9% of residents were 65 years of age or older. For every 100 females there were 95.7 males, and for every 100 females age 18 and over there were 92.6 males age 18 and over.

99.5% of residents lived in urban areas, while 0.5% lived in rural areas.

There were 33,244 households in Deltona, of which 33.6% had children under the age of 18 living in them. Of all households, 51.1% were married-couple households, 15.4% were households with a male householder and no spouse or partner present, and 24.6% were households with a female householder and no spouse or partner present. About 18.6% of all households were made up of individuals and 8.7% had someone living alone who was 65 years of age or older.

There were 35,035 housing units, of which 5.1% were vacant. The homeowner vacancy rate was 1.9% and the rental vacancy rate was 5.0%.

Racial composition as of the 2020 census
| Race | Number | Percent |
|---|---|---|
| White | 51,205 | 54.7% |
| Black or African American | 10,914 | 11.6% |
| American Indian and Alaska Native | 499 | 0.5% |
| Asian | 1,390 | 1.5% |
| Native Hawaiian and Other Pacific Islander | 76 | 0.1% |
| Some other race | 11,666 | 12.5% |
| Two or more races | 17,942 | 19.1% |
| Hispanic or Latino (of any race) | 35,259 | 37.6% |

=== 2010 census ===
As of the 2010 United States census, there were 85,182 people, 29,400 households, and 22,459 families residing in the city.

The 2010 U.S. Census data indicated that 30.2% of the city's population were Hispanic or Latino. The majority of Hispanic residents in Deltona were Puerto Rican, and made up 20.7% of the population. 1.8% of the population were Cuban, 1.6% of the population were Mexican, 1.5% of the population were Dominican, and 4.6% of the population were of other Hispanic or Latino origin, as of 2010.

=== 2000 census ===
In 2000, 32.8% had children under the age of 18 living with them, 55% were married couples living together, 15.3% had a female householder with no husband present, and 23.7% were non-families. Of all households, 38.3% were made up of individuals, and 26.6% had someone living alone who was 65 years of age or older.

As of 2000, the median income for a household in the city was $50,058. Males had a median income of $34,478 versus $27,230 for females. The per capita income for the city was $21,019. About 11.1% of the population were below the poverty line.

As of 2000, English spoken as a first language accounted for 81.39% of all residents, while 18.60% spoke other languages as their mother tongue. The most significant were Spanish speakers who made up 15.85% of the population, while Italian came up as the third most spoken language, which made up 0.71%, and French was at fourth, with 0.58% of the population.

== Government and infrastructure ==
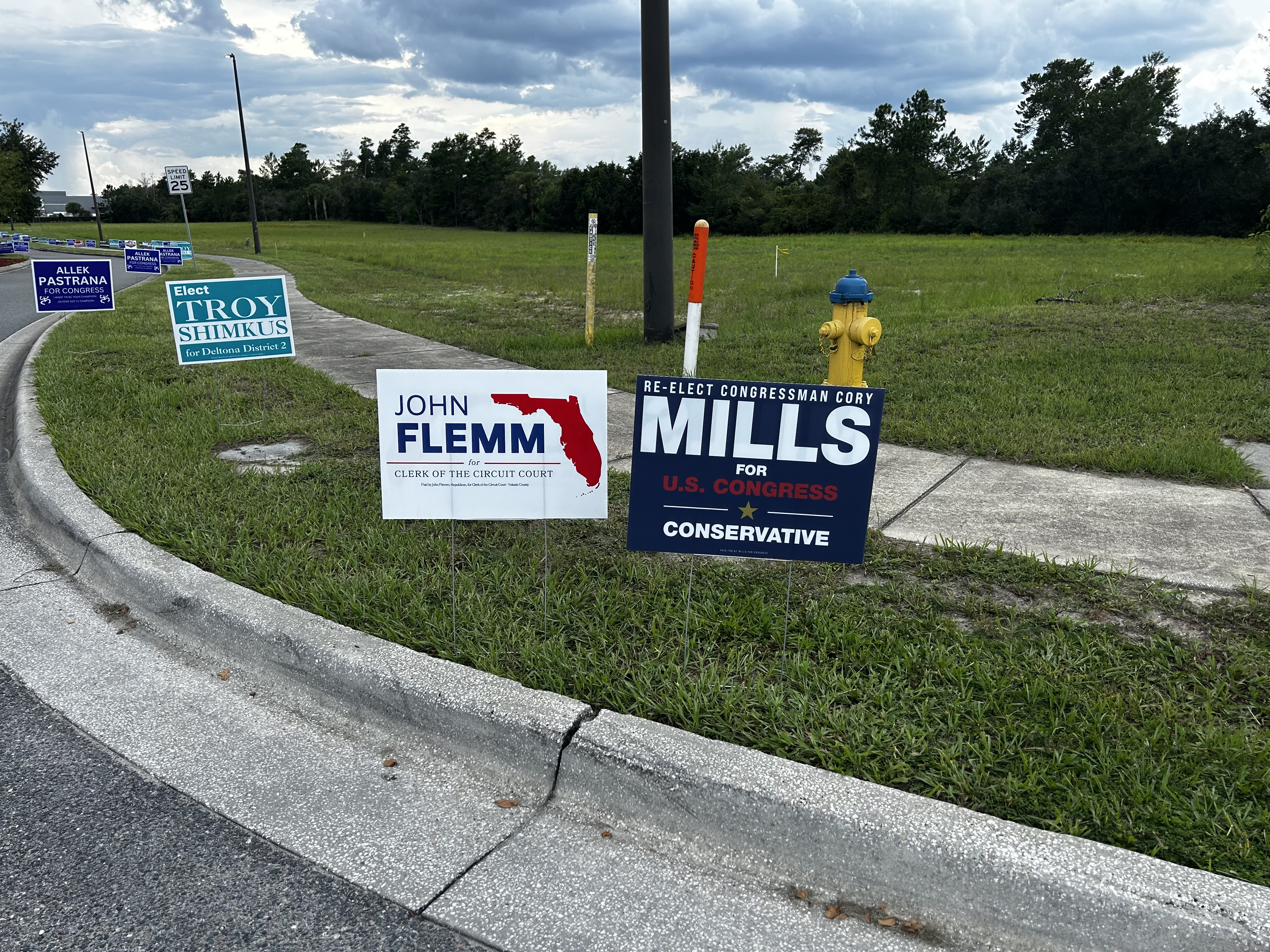
Campaign signs in Deltona, 2024

Deltona operates under a commission–manager form of government, consisting of seven elected officials, and an appointed city manager. Residents elect, through non-partisan elections, a mayor who represents the city at-large and six commission members who each represent a specific district of the community. Elected officials serve four-year terms, with a limit of two successive four-year terms. The mayor serves as the presiding officer at official meetings and as the ceremonial head of the city. A vice mayor is elected annually by the city commission from among the commission members. The current mayor is Santiago Avila, who was elected into office in November 2022.

No invocation is normally recited at the start of City Commission meetings. However, in June, 2017, the national group Americans United for Separation of Church and State, acting on behalf of a Deltona resident, contacted the city's attorneys to advise them that the reading of passages from the Bible by City Commissioner Christopher Alcantara allegedly violates the Establishment Clause of the First Amendment of the United States Constitution. The city responded that “engaging in the recitation of Biblical verse during a public meeting is not in and of itself enough for an Establishment Clause violation.”

Citywide public bus transportation and paratransit service is provided by Votran, a public transit service governed by the County of Volusia. SunRail provides commuter rail service to the Orlando area in the neighboring city of DeBary via Votran feeder bus service to the DeBary station, and a 275-space park and ride. The closest major passenger airport to Deltona is Orlando International Airport, located approximately 33 miles (53 km) south. Additional commercial airline service is provided at Orlando Sanford International Airport, approximately 9 miles (14 km) south, and Daytona Beach International Airport, approximately 22 miles (35 km) northeast. Deltona's only limited-access highway is Interstate 4, and traverses through the city's western boundary. Other major highways include Florida State Road 472, which terminates near the city limit in northwestern Deltona at Howland Boulevard, and Florida State Road 415, which traverses through the city's southeastern boundary.

The city's water supply and wastewater management is overseen by Deltona Water, a division of the City of Deltona's Public Works Department, with some areas managed by the Volusia County Water Resources and Utilities division. Its main water supply comes from the Floridan aquifer system, one of the most productive aquifers in the world. Commercial solid waste (trash and garbage collection), and yard waste services are offered through Waste Pro. Natural gas is provided by Florida Public Utilities. Electric power service is provided by Florida Power & Light and Duke Energy. Wired telephone service is provided by AT&T and CenturyLink. Cable television is provided by Spectrum.

== Economy ==
As of 2013, 60.0% of the population aged 16 years and over was in the labor force, with 52.7% employed and 7.2% unemployed. 32.4% of the population worked in sales and office occupations; 24.8% worked in management, business, science and arts occupations; 20.7% in service occupations; 11.5% in production, transportation, and material moving occupations; and 10.6% in natural resources, construction, and maintenance occupations. The industries for which the city's inhabitants worked were 20.0% educational, health, and social services; 15.4% retail trade; 10.7% professional, scientific, management, administrative and waste management services; 9.5% arts, entertainment, recreation, accommodation and food services; 7.7% manufacturing; 7.6% finance, insurance, real estate, and rental and leasing; 7.2% construction; 6.3% public administration; 5.1% transportation, warehousing and utilities; 4.5% other services (except public administration); 3.5% information; 2.2% wholesale trade; and 0.4% agriculture, forestry, fishing and hunting, and mining. 82.7% of workers worked in the private sector, 12.7% in government, and 4.6% self-employed in unincorporated businesses. 85.9% of the population commute to work by driving alone in own car, with 8.1% consisting of carpoolers, 3.3% worked from home, 0.5% walked to work, 0.4% used public transportation (excluding taxicab), and 1.7% used other means to travel to work. The average commute time for workers is 32 minutes.

Fitch, Moody's, and Standard & Poor's rated Deltona bonds as "AA-" from 2013 to 2014. Fitch attributed Deltona's small commercial sector to the city being a "largely residential and mostly built-out community", but did acknowledge the city's improving unemployment rate, dropping from a peak of 12% in 2010 to 6.4% in June 2014. As of 2014, the largest employers in the city include Daytona State College, followed by Publix Super Markets, and Walmart.

== Education ==
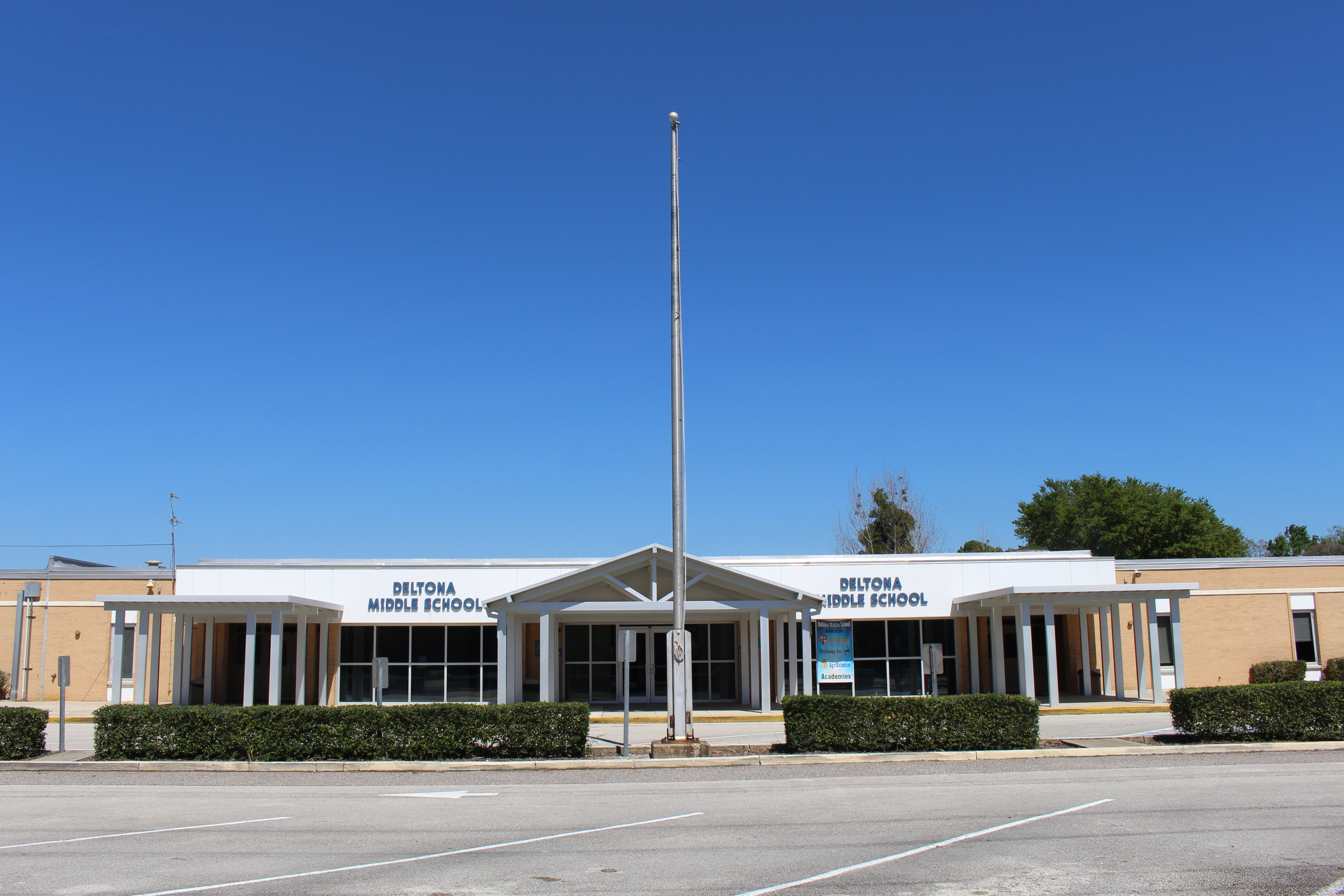
Deltona Middle School

According to the 2010 American Community Survey, 14.2% of all adults over the age of 25 in Deltona have obtained a bachelor's degree, which was below the national average of 27.2% of adults over 25, and 84.7% of Deltona residents over the age of 25 have earned a high school diploma, as compared to the national average of 85.0%. Deltona had approximately 11,877 students enrolled in its public schools in the 2012–2013 school year. Three private schools are located in the city, offering both primary and secondary education. Higher education is offered by Bethune-Cookman University and Daytona State College through satellite campuses located in the city.

Public primary and secondary education is handled by Volusia County Schools (VCS). VCS operates 2 high schools (Deltona High School and Pine Ridge High School), 3 middle schools (Galaxy, Heritage and Deltona Middle Schools) and 7 elementary schools within city limits. One elementary school is located in unincorporated Deltona, and four public schools in neighboring communities serve outer portions of the city. In 2010, the Florida Department of Education awarded all public elementary and middle schools in the city "A" or "B" grades based on their performance on the Florida Comprehensive Assessment Test. In 2013, both public high schools in the city received a "B."

Schools in Deltona, Florida

Elementary schools (Note: Operated by Volusia County Schools.)

- Deltona Lakes Elementary School
- Discovery Elementary School
- Forest Lake Elementary School (Note: Located in unincorporated Deltona.)
- Friendship Elementary School
- Pride Elementary School
- Spirit Elementary School
- Sunrise Elementary School
- Timbercrest Elementary School

Middle schools

- Deltona Middle School
- Galaxy Middle School
- Heritage Middle School

High schools

- Deltona High School
- Pine Ridge High School

Private schools

- Deltona Adventist School
- Deltona Christian School
- Good Shepherd Academy
- Trinity Christian Academy

Additional public schools serving Deltona

- University High School (in Orange City)
- Enterprise Elementary School (in Enterprise)
- Osteen Elementary School (in Osteen)
- Volusia Pines Elementary School (in Lake Helen)

Footnotes

== Media and culture ==
Deltona is a part of the Orlando–Daytona Beach–Melbourne media market, which is the 33rd largest radio market and the eighteenth largest television market in the United States. Its primary daily newspapers are the Orlando Sentinel, The Daytona Beach News-Journal, and the West Volusia Beacon. The city is also served by El Sentinel, the Spanish-language counterpart of the Orlando Sentinel and the city run Deltona TV which live streams city commission meetings and original programing online.

The city has one public library, the Deltona Regional Library, a branch of the Volusia County Public Library system which consists of the main library, an environmental learning center, and a 1,000-seat outdoor amphitheater built for community gatherings and educational instruction. The 50,000 square foot (4,645 m^{2}) facility received a Silver Certification from the U.S. Green Building Council. The library is adjacent to the Lyonia Preserve, a 360-acre (146 ha) joint project between Volusia County's Land Acquisition & Management Division and the District School Board. The purpose of the project is to restore and maintain the area's endangered scrub habitat. The Lyonia Environmental Center, located at the library, serves to encourage discovery and exploration of Volusia County's ecosystems and foster community involvement in conservation efforts.

== Notable people ==
- Chad Brown (born 1996), basketball player in the Lega Basket Serie A
- Montana DuRapau, former MLB pitcher for the Pittsburgh Pirates
- Paxton Lynch, former Denver Broncos quarterback
- John Masiarcyzk Sr., former first and third mayor of Deltona
- Dennis Mulder, business owner and the former second mayor of Deltona
- David Santiago, current Florida State Representative representing the 27th district
