= University High School (Orange City, Florida) =

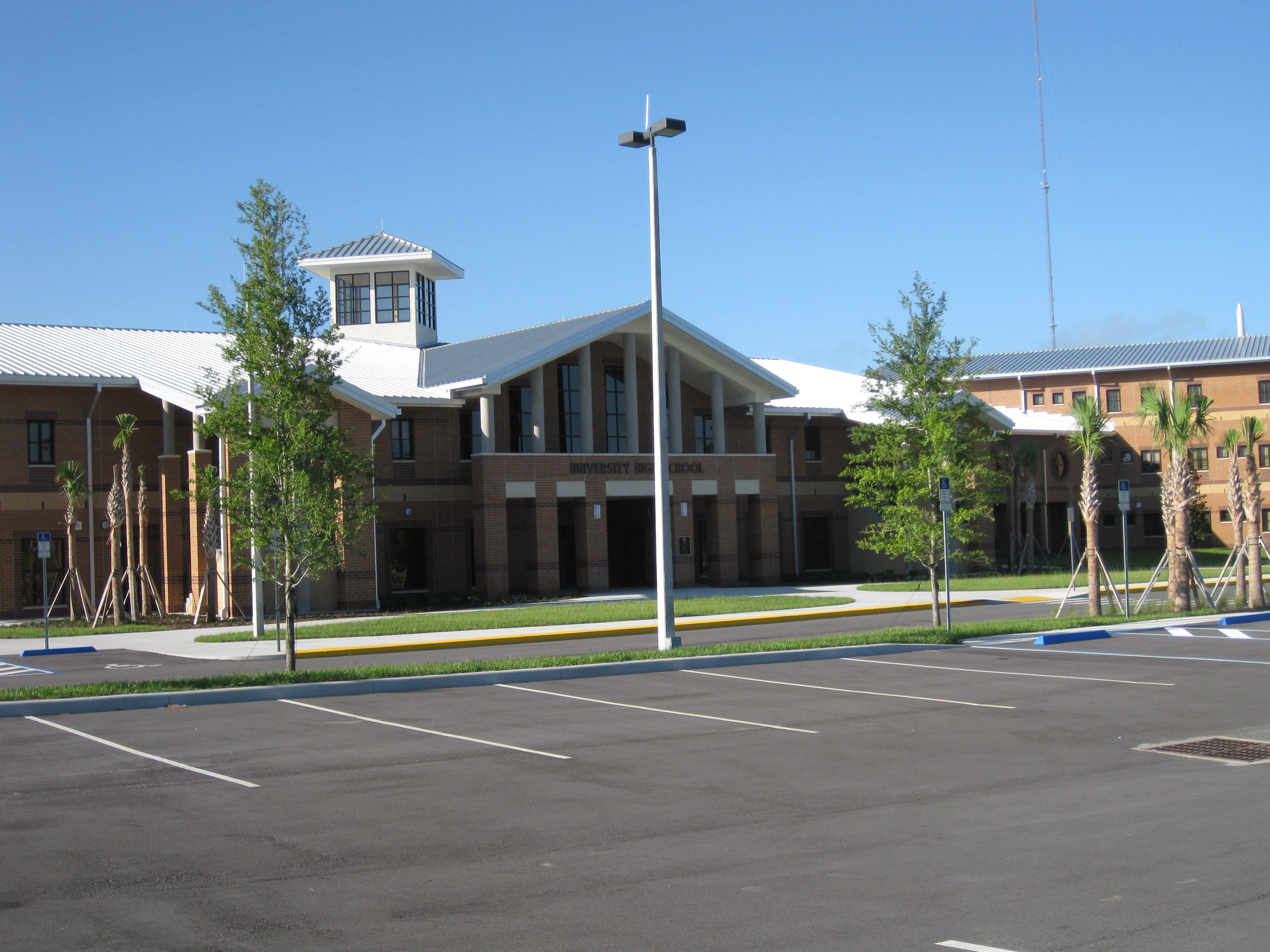
- Main entrance of University High School

Location
- 1000 W Rhode Island Ave; Orange City, Florida 32763; United States; 28.9341°N 81.3031°W

Information
- Type: Public
- Motto: Knowledge, strength, courage, respect
- Established: 2010
- Status: Open
- School district: Volusia County Schools
- Dean: Trae Weiss; Heather Whetstone
- Principal: Amanda Wiles
- Teaching staff: 113.00 (FTE)
- Grades: 9–12
- Gender: Male (50.68%); Female (49.32%)
- Enrollment: 2,855 (2024-2025)
- Student to teacher ratio: 25.2
- Campus: Suburban
- Colors: Orange, white and grey
- Mascot: Titan
- Accreditation: Southern Association of Colleges and Schools
- Florida District ID: 64
- Florida School ID: 1551
- Website: www.uhstitans.com

University High School is a public, four-year high school located in Orange City, Florida, United States. Established in 2010, it is the newest high school established in Volusia County since 1994, as well as its costliest. As of 2010, it was the largest high school in Volusia County by enrollment.

The school opened on August 16, 2010. About 500 students at the new high school come from DeBary, about 500 from Orange City, another 250 from the unincorporated area around Orange City, and about 900 from Deltona. The school did not have a senior class for its 2010–2011 school year. The school has an elaborate advanced-placement program.

University High School is partnered with the University of Central Florida, Stetson University, and Embry Riddle Aeronautical University in sponsoring two academies: the STEM Academy and the Academy of Finance. Stetson has an advisory role in the program. For the 2016–2017 school year, University High School had 2,824 students enrolled.

== Notable alumni ==
- Logan Allen, professional baseball pitcher for the Cleveland Guardians of Major League Baseball
- Jalyx Hunt, professional football player for the Philadelphia Eagles of the National Football League
- Garrett Stewart, Marine and Certified 2016 Iron Man Mat Gladiator

== See also ==
- List of high schools in Florida
