= Orange City, Florida =

City in the United States

- City
- City of Orange City
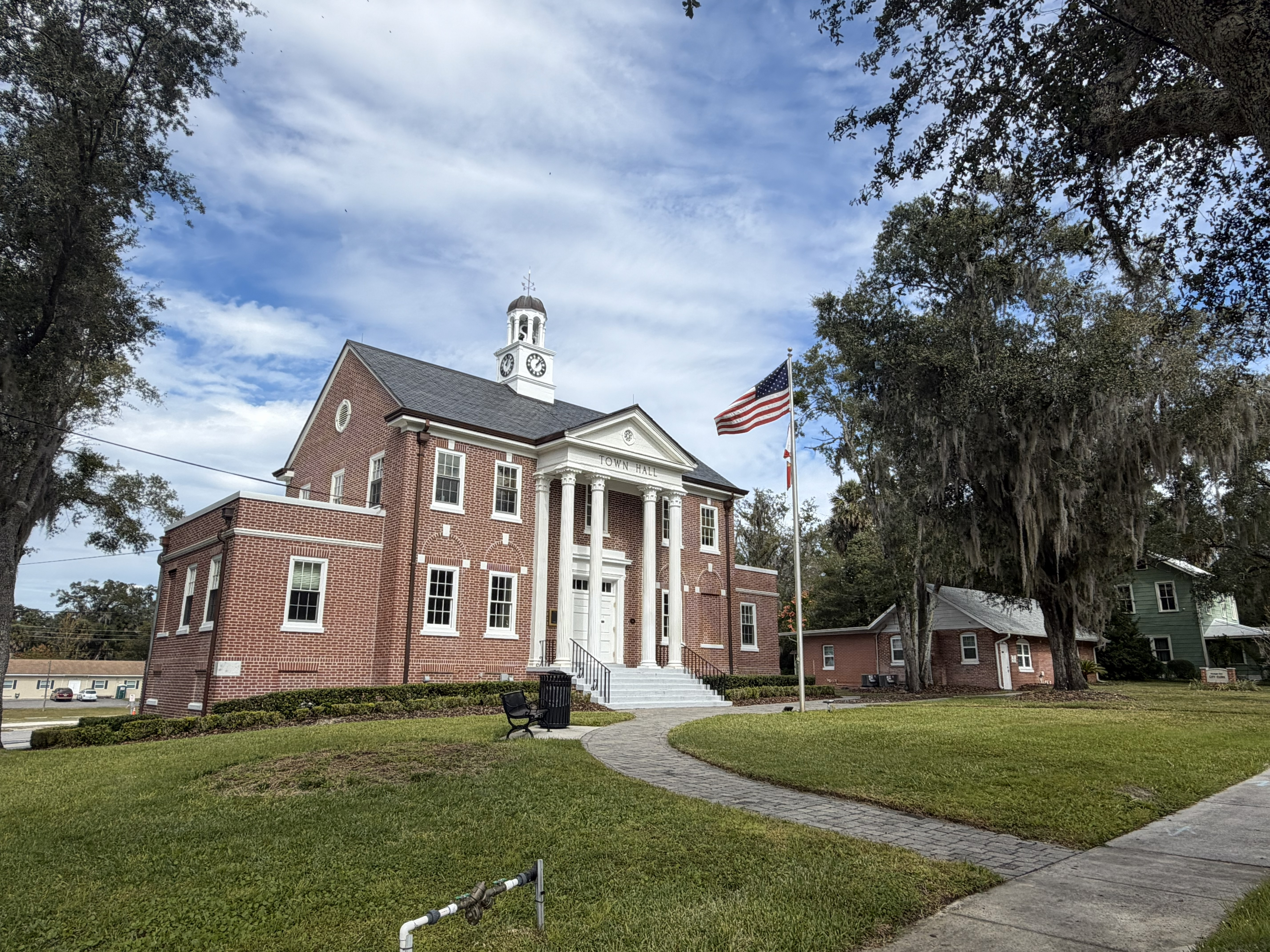
- Orange City Town Hall

- Seal
- Nickname: The Heart of Southwest Volusia
- Location in Volusia County and the state of Florida
- Coordinates: 28°56′05″N 81°17′17″W
- Country: United States
- State: Florida
- County: Volusia
- Incorporated: 1882

Government
  - Type: Council–Manager

Area
  - Total: 7.92 sq mi (20.50 km^{2})
  - Land: 7.82 sq mi (20.25 km^{2})
  - Water: 0.097 sq mi (0.25 km^{2})
- Elevation: 102 ft (31 m)

Population (2020)
  - Total: 12,632
  - Density: 1,616.0/sq mi (623.93/km^{2})
- Time zone: UTC-5 (Eastern)
  - Summer (DST): UTC-4 (EDT)
- ZIP code: 32763
- Area code: 386
- FIPS code: 12-51825
- GNIS feature ID: 2404440
- Website: www.orangecityfl.gov

Orange City is a city in Volusia County, Florida, United States. It is a part of the Deltona–Daytona Beach–Ormond Beach metropolitan area. As of the 2020 US census, the city had a population of 12,632.

== Geography ==
According to the United States Census Bureau, the city has a total area of 7.2 square miles (18.6 km^{2}), of which 7.1 square miles (18.3 km^{2}) are land and 0.077 square miles (0.2 km^{2}) or 1.31%, is covered by water.

== History ==
Orange City was incorporated as a city in 1882. The city was named for the thousands of acres of orange groves in and around the city. Twelve years later, the Great Freeze wiped out the orange groves for which the town was named.

Orange City received the "highest award that the world can give" for its water at the 1904 Louisiana Purchase Exposition. John D. Rockefeller Sr. had Orange City Mineral Springs water sent to him wherever he traveled, and even used it for bathing.

=== Historic places ===
Sites on the National Register of Historic Places in Orange City include:

- Dickinson Memorial Library and Park
- Louis P. Thursby House
- Orange City Colored School
- Orange City Historic District
- Orange City Town Hall
- Seth French House
- 1876 Heritage Inn

== Demographics ==
Historical population
Census	Pop.	Note	%±
1900	365		—
1910	490		34.2%
1920	497		1.4%
1930	572		15.1%
1940	489		−14.5%
1950	797		63.0%
1960	1,598		100.5%
1970	1,777		11.2%
1980	2,795		57.3%
1990	5,347		91.3%
2000	6,604		23.5%
2010	10,599		60.5%
2020	12,632		19.2%
U.S. Decennial Census

=== Racial and ethnic composition ===
Orange City racial composition (Hispanics excluded from racial categories) (NH = Non-Hispanic)
Race	Pop 2010	Pop 2020	% 2010	% 2020
White (NH)	7,852	7,930	74.08%	62.78%
Black or African American (NH)	609	967	5.75%	7.66%
Native American or Alaska Native (NH)	34	27	0.32%	0.21%
Asian (NH)	149	248	1.41%	1.96%
Pacific Islander or Native Hawaiian (NH)	2	3	0.02%	0.02%
Some other race (NH)	12	46	0.11%	0.36%
Two or more races/Multiracial (NH)	147	441	1.39%	3.49%
Hispanic or Latino (any race)	1,794	2,970	16.93%	23.51%
Total	10,599	12,632		

=== 2020 census ===
As of the 2020 census, Orange City had a population of 12,632. The median age was 48.8 years. 18.4% of residents were under the age of 18 and 30.3% of residents were 65 years of age or older. For every 100 females, there were 82.9 males, and for every 100 females age 18 and over there were 79.3 males.

99.8% of residents lived in urban areas, while 0.2% lived in rural areas.

There were 5,791 households in Orange City, of which 22.9% had children under the age of 18 living in them. Of all households, 36.5% were married-couple households, 18.4% were households with a male householder and no spouse or partner present, and 37.7% were households with a female householder and no spouse or partner present. About 38.2% of all households were made up of individuals and 24.0% had someone living alone who was 65 years of age or older.

There were 6,561 housing units, of which 11.7% were vacant. The homeowner vacancy rate was 3.7% and the rental vacancy rate was 7.8%.

According to the 2020 ACS 5-year estimates, there were 3,239 families residing in the city.

=== 2010 census ===
As of the 2010 United States census, there were 10,599 people, 4,877 households, and 2,488 families residing in the city.

=== 2000 census ===
In the census of 2000, 6,604 people, 3,062 households, and 1,904 families resided in the city. The population density was 1,091.4 inhabitants per square mile (421.4/km^{2}). The 3,685 housing units averaged 609.0 per square mile (235.2/km^{2}). The racial makeup of the city was 92.97% White, 3.66% African American, 0.38% Native American, 0.56% Asian, 1.47% from other races, and 0.95% from two or more races. About 5.13% of the population was Hispanic or Latino of any race.

Of the 3,062 households in 2000, 19.9% had children under the age of 18 living with them, 49.3% were married couples living together, 9.8% had a female householder with no husband present, and 37.8% were not families. Around 32.4% of all households were made up of individuals, and 18.4% had someone living alone who was 65 years of age or older. The average household size was 2.12 and the average family size was 2.63.

In 2000, in the city, the population was distributed as 17.5% under the age of 18, 5.8% from 18 to 24, 21.4% from 25 to 44, 24.2% from 45 to 64, and 31.1% who were 65 years of age or older. The median age was 49 years. For every 100 females, there were 86.5 males. For every 100 females age 18 and over, there were 82.9 males.

In 2000, the median income for a household in the city was $26,883, and for a family was $34,003. Males had a median income of $29,817 versus $21,034 for females. The per capita income for the city was $16,318. About 9.9% of the population and 7.1% of families were below the poverty line. Of the total population, 15.2% of those under the age of 18 and 7.0% of those 65 and older were living below the poverty line.

== Government and infrastructure ==
The United States Postal Service operates a post office at 260 N Industrial Drive.

=== Government ===
The City of Orange City has a council–manager government. The city council is composed of a mayor and six council members who serve overlapping four-year terms. The city council serves as the elected legislative and governing body responsible for establishing policies, adopting an annual budget, adopting local laws and ordinances, and hiring and overseeing the city manager, city attorney, and municipal clerk. The mayor and council members are elected by voters citywide and must reside within the corporate limits of Orange City. Council members run for office by district (five) and one at-large.

=== Fire department ===
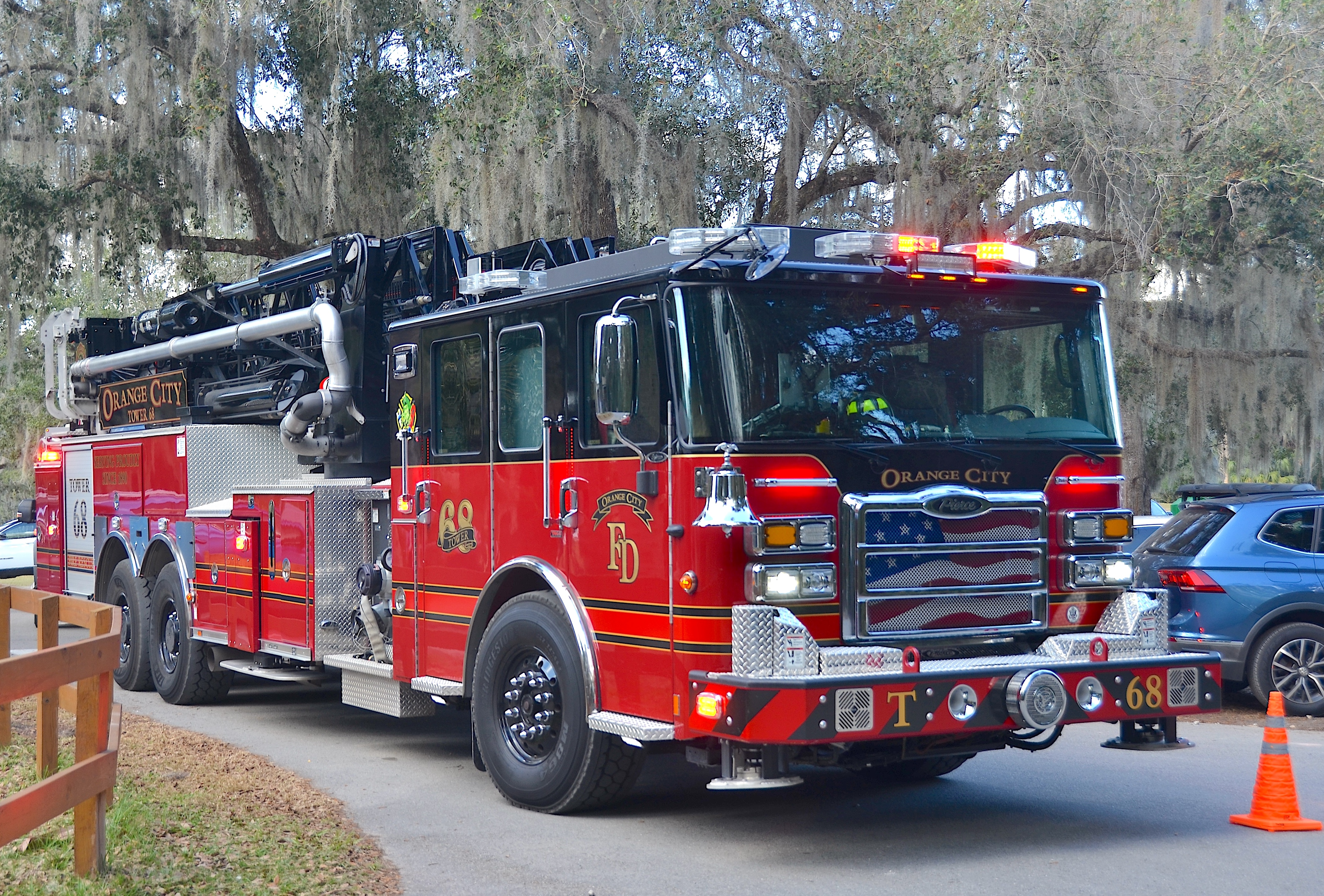
Pierce Fire Engine of Station 68

The Orange City Fire Department, established in 1890, is a combination department (volunteer and paid). The department consists of two fire stations; station 67, located at 215 N. Holly Ave, is also the main station where administration is housed. Station 68 is located at the south-end water plant. This is a secured facility and not accessible for the public. The department was recently awarded a class 2 ISO rating, first and only in Volusia County. The Orange City Fire Department is contracted to provide fire services to the City of DeBary, Florida (Station 33). All engines and the Rescue are ALS supplied and staffed with paramedics.

=== Public transportation ===
- Interstate 4
- State Road 472

Orange City is served by the #20, #21, #22, & #23 routes operated by Volusia County Public Transit System.

== Education ==
=== Elementary schools ===
- Manatee Cove Elementary School
- Orange City Elementary School

=== Middle schools ===
- River Springs Middle School

=== High schools ===
- University High School

== Notable people ==
- Herbert L. Becker, magician who performed under the name Kardeen
- Gaylord DuBois, author of the novel The Lone Ranger
- Danny Kelley, American stock-car racing driver
- Tom Laputka, former football player for Ottawa Rough Riders and Edmonton Eskimos, former mayor of Orange City
- Gar Samuelson, former drummer for heavy metal band Megadeth
