= Harold Garde =

American painter (1923–2022)

- Born: June 7, 1923; New York City, U.S.
- Died: October 11, 2022 (aged 99); Florida, U.S.
- Education: University of Wyoming (BFA, 1949); Columbia University (MFA, 1951)
- Known for: Painting, printmaking
- Movement: Abstract expressionism Strappo printmaking
- Spouse(s): Mimi Rosenberg (1946–1977); Barbara Kramer (1982–1998)
- Children: 4
- Website: haroldgardeart.com

Iconoclass Acrylic on board, 8' x 22', 1972-76 Museum of Florida Art

Sighting Strappo, 7" x 5", 2007 Private collection

Harold Garde (June 7, 1923 – October 11, 2022) was an American abstract expressionist painter and the originator and namer of the Strappo technique.

== Early life and education ==
Garde was born on June 7, 1923, in New York City, to immigrant Eastern European Jewish parents. After graduating from Stuyvesant High School, he attended City College of New York for three years, where he majored in science. Before completing his undergraduate studies, he joined the United States Air Force, serving in the Philippines and in World War II from 1943 to 1945. Post-war, he switched his focus and completed a Bachelor of Fine Arts at the University of Wyoming in Laramie, where he studied under surrealist Leon Kelly, abstract expressionist George McNeil and geometric abstractionist Ilya Bolotowsky. He earned a master's degree in fine arts and art education from Columbia University in New York in 1951.

== Career ==
=== Teaching ===
After graduating from Columbia, Garde worked for 15 years in New York City's commercial interior design industry. In 1968, now married with four children, he began teaching art at Nassau Community College in Garden City, New York, and at a secondary school in Port Washington, New York, while continuing to paint professionally. In an effort to produce art full-time, Garde retired from teaching in 1984.

=== Painting ===
Abstract expressionist art mixed with surrealist and figurative elements defined Garde's early work. In the early 1980s, his subjects transitioned from rounded human figures to structural shapes, segueing to series of objects, such as chairs, vases, and kimonos. Some of his paintings focus on a sequence of letters or numbers. Garde's work executed in Maine incorporates colors far more vibrant than those from his earlier years in New York. He attributed this transformation to Maine's natural light, and wanting his paintings to be brighter and fresher in his advanced age. Some of his mediums include acrylics on canvases of various sizes, ceramic, and clay sculptures, and Strappo prints.

Garde had his first solo exhibition in 1970 in Huntington, New York. Over 40 years later, the Museum of Florida Art added his 8x24-foot, 16-panel mural Iconoclass (c. 1970s) to its permanent collection. Original pieces are displayed inside, with a reproduction installed on the building's exterior façade since the 2012 acquisition. His Rendered Kimonos series (c. 1995-2005) conveys a variety of sizes and forms. In 2001, the Farnsworth Art Museum in Rockland, Maine, showcased the Japanese garb-inspired kimono paintings in a solo exhibition. Garde's work is on display as part of the permanent collections of the Portland Museum of Art, Farnsworth Art Museum, New Mexico Museum of Art, University of Wyoming Art Museum, Museum of Florida Art, and the Bibliothèque nationale de France, among others.

=== Strappo printmaking ===
In the mid-1980s, Garde invented, developed, and named Strappo printmaking, an artistic technique combining painting and printmaking that he taught in workshops nationwide. Transferring dried acrylic paint layers from glass or another smooth surface onto paper or canvas produces a layered image's reversal and Strappo monotype. In celebration of his 90th birthday and as a New Year's challenge, Garde created one new Strappo print each day for the first 90 days of 2013.

== Personal life and death ==
In 1984, Garde and his second wife, writer Barbara Kramer, moved to Belfast, Maine, where he set up a waterfront studio. In 1993, they purchased an additional home in New Smyrna Beach, Florida. Garde split his time between his art studios in Maine and Florida. Kramer died in 1998.

Garde died in Florida on October 11, 2022, at the age of 99.

== Exhibitions (selected) ==
- Baiter Gallery, Huntington, NY, 1970
- Brooklyn College, Brooklyn, NY, 1971–72
- Linden Gallery, New York, NY, 1982
- Deicas Gallery, La Jolla, CA, 1983
- Palm Gallery, Brooklyn, NY, 1984
- ACW Gallery, San Diego, CA, 1985
- Instituto Allende, San Miguel de Allende, Mexico, 1985
- Sena Gallery, Santa Fe, NM, 1985
- Theodore F. Wolff, curator, On the Edge: Forty Years of Maine Painting 1952-1992, included in exhibition and accompanying book
- Hamlet Series, Wade Wilson Art, Chicago, IL, 1990
- The Prints and Paintings of Harold Garde, Harris House of the Atlantic Center for the Arts, New Smyrna Beach, FL, 1995
- Harold Garde: Acrylic Paintings and Prints, DeLand Museum, DeLand, FL, 1996
- The Belfast Prints, Maine Coast Artists, Rockport, ME, 1998
- Recent Studio Selections, Nassau County Firehouse Gallery, Garden City, NY, 2000
- Kimono: Harold Garde, Farnsworth Art Museum, Rockland, ME, 2001
- Harold Garde. A Retrospective, University of Maine at Farmington, 2005
- Brevard Art Museum, Melbourne, FL, 2007
- Cornell Museum of Art & American Culture, Delray, FL, 2008
- Harold Garde. Painting. 50 Years., Museum of Florida Art, DeLand, FL, 2008-09
- Millenia Art Gallery, Orlando, FL, 2009
- Mulford Gallery, Rockland, ME, 2009
- Abstract Expressionism, Three Maine Artists, Courthouse Gallery Fine Art, Ellsworth, ME, 2010
- Art Museum of the University of Wyoming, Laramie, WY, 2010
- Wade Wilson Gallery, Houston, TX, 2010
- Harold Garde: All The Walls, Harbor Square Gallery, Rockland, ME, 2012
- Garde Addendum, Maine Jewish Museum, Portland, ME, 2013
- 90 90 90, Harbor Square Gallery, Rockland, ME, 2013
- Harold Garde: Masterworks, Jai Gallery, Orlando, FL, 2014
- Mid-Century to This Century, Orlando Museum of Art, Orlando, FL, 2015
- Last of the Game Changers, HENAO Contemporary Center, Orlando, FL, 2016
- Harold Garde: Ab-Ex to Neo-Expressionism, Artlery 160 Gallery, Boston, MA, 2017-18
- New Works, ArtSuite Gallery, Piermont, NY, 2018
- Never Too Late, Center for the Arts, Mount Dora, FL, 2019
- Some Reliable Truths About Chairs, Union of Maine Visual Artists Gallery, Portland, ME, 2019
- Burn This Down: Reflections on the Art World, Mills Gallery, Orlando, FL, 2019
- When There Was Another Me, University of Maine Museum of Art, Bangor, ME, 2019

== Filmography ==
Garde was the subject of a 30-minute film about his life and art as part of the Union of Maine Visual Arts' nine-film series Maine Masters. He was also the subject of the hour-long film Harold Garde, Working Artist, directed by Dale Schierholt, about his life and work. The latter premiered at the Museum of Florida Art in 2009, presented in conjunction with the museum's retrospective touring exhibit, Harold Garde. Painting. 50 Years. In 2015, Harold Garde: Art & Spirit, a 60-minute documentary, was a Selection of the Newport Film Festival, among other festivals, and has had numerous showings, including the Center for Maine Contemporary Art in conjunction with the Strand Theatre and Farnsworth Art Museum and Maine Public Television.
