= DeLand Hall =

- U.S. National Register of Historic Places
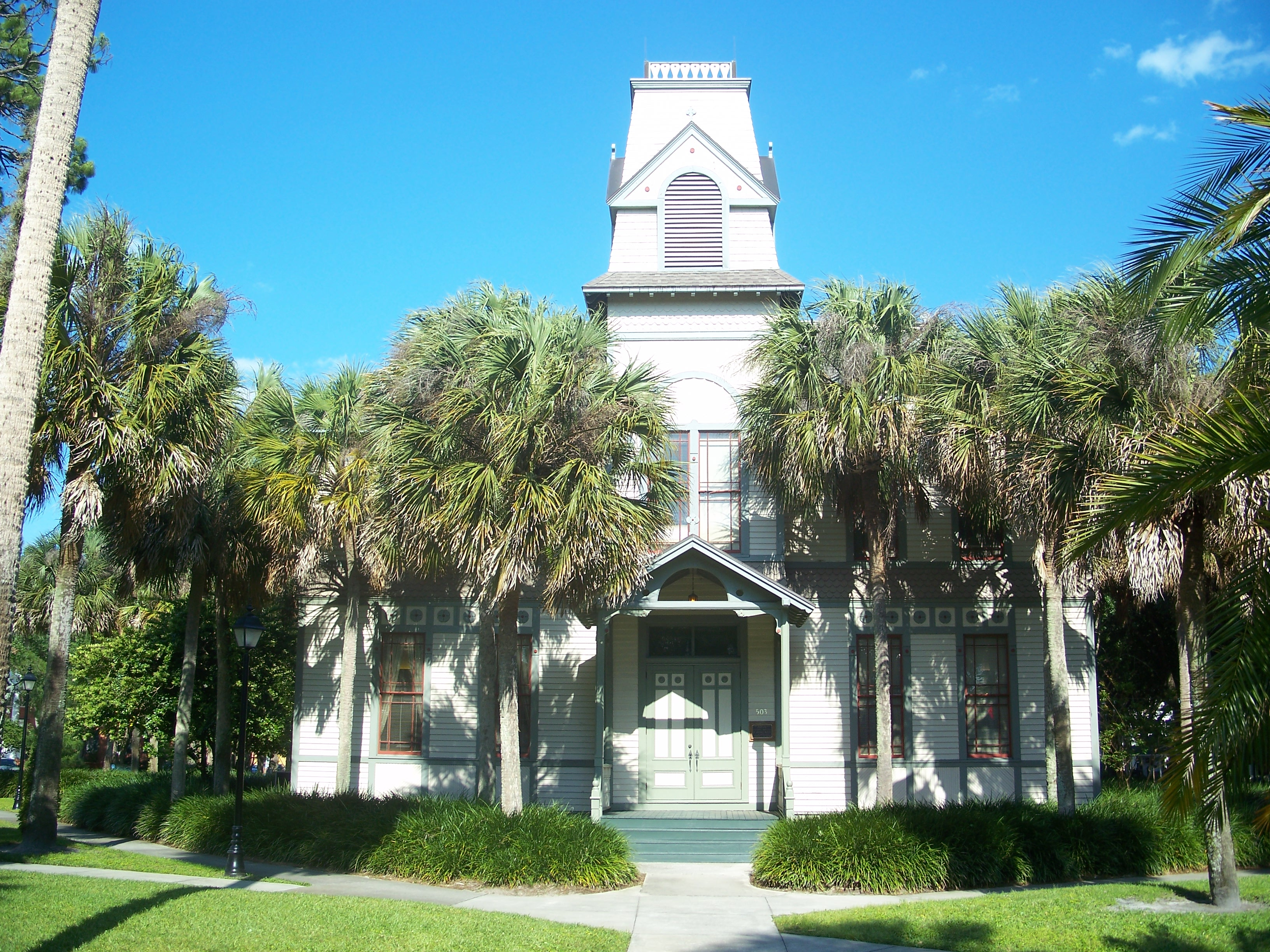
- Location: DeLand, Florida United States
- Coordinates: 29°2′6″N 81°18′12″W
- Built: 1884+
- Architectural style: Stick-Eastlake
- NRHP reference No.: 83001441
- Added to NRHP: January 27, 1983

The DeLand Hall is a historic site in DeLand, Florida, United States. It is located within the Stetson University Campus Historic District, on the northeast corner of an entrance to the university at from North Woodland Boulevard (US 17/92) across from West Minnesota Avenue. On January 27, 1983, it was added to the U.S. National Register of Historic Places.
