= Medwin Peek =

American architect

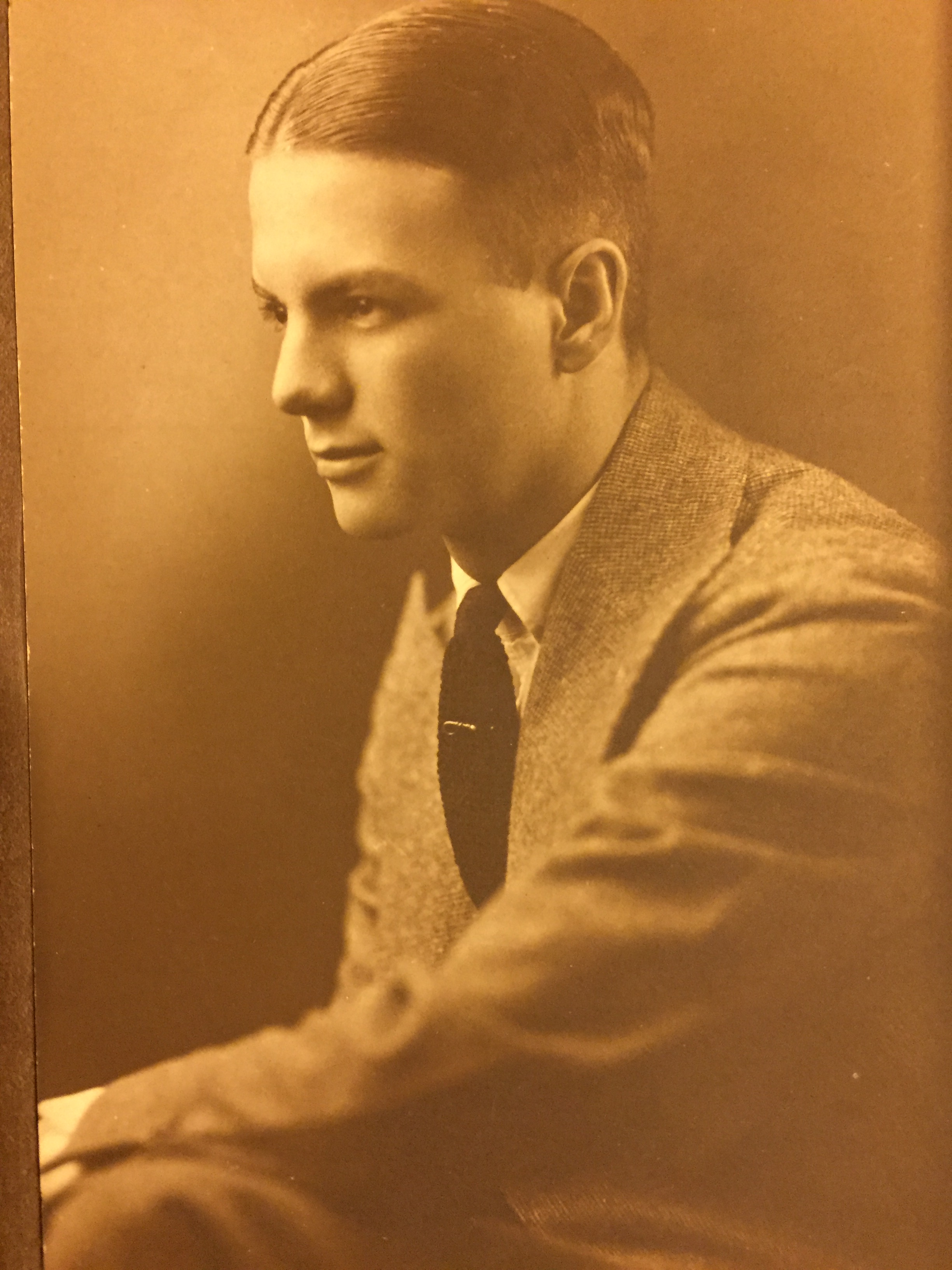

Gouverneur Medwin Peek was an American architect who practiced in Central Florida in the middle years of the twentieth century.

== Early years and education ==
Peek was born January 26, 1900, in Palatka, Putnam County, Florida, to Gouverneur Frank Peek and Rebecca Medwin Hyde. His father died the year after his birth. He and his mother lived with his maternal grandmother, Anne Elizabeth Copcutt Hyde in DeLand, and two spinster relatives Aunt Marianna Hyde and great-Aunt Anna Crook Copcutt. Peek graduated with a Bachelor of Science degree from Stetson University in 1920. He then studied at Harvard University (Master in Architecture, 1924), his senior thesis being "A Casino at De Leon Springs." His Harvard education included two years of study in Italy. After serving as artist of record on an archaeological team at Deir el Baḥri, in Egypt (1924–1925), Peek then returned to Florida to begin architectural practice in DeLand. He did the major design for the National Archives Building in Washington, D.C., when he worked for the John Russell Pope Architectural firm. He was commissioned by the Metropolitan Museum of Art to draw sketches of the King Tutankhamen digs, shortly after graduating from Harvard.

== Practice in DeLand, Florida ==
Peek designed many landmark structures in DeLand, including the old City Hall and the civic band shell. Peek also created notable homes in DeLand's University Terrace neighborhood. The subdivision is contained by Amelia, Garfield, Oakdale and University Avenues. It was platted in late 1925 by Harry W. Prahl, who was a contractor from Erie, Pennsylvania. and who employed Peek as consulting architect between 1926 and 1928. The development comprised the styles popular in Florida at the time, with Tudor and Colonial designs on the south side of Pennsylvania Avenue and those with Mediterranean and Mission revival to the north.

Medwin Peek was a childhood friend of Bert Fish and served as the architect of the Fish Memorial Hospitals. His address, at 714 N. Woodland Blvd., DeLand, FL, is now part of the campus of First Presbyterian Church, DeLand.

== Personal life ==
Peek married Alleyne Caroline Foster (4 Aug. 1906, Springfield, Windsor, Vermont - 24 Jul 1989, Longwood, Seminole, Florida) on 25 Aug 1927 in Daytona Beach, Volusia, Florida. He married Ellen Tansel on November 21, 1942. Peek died on 25 Apr 1979, in DeLand, at the age of 79. Personal Family Records of Grandson, Russell A. Peek

== Selected work ==
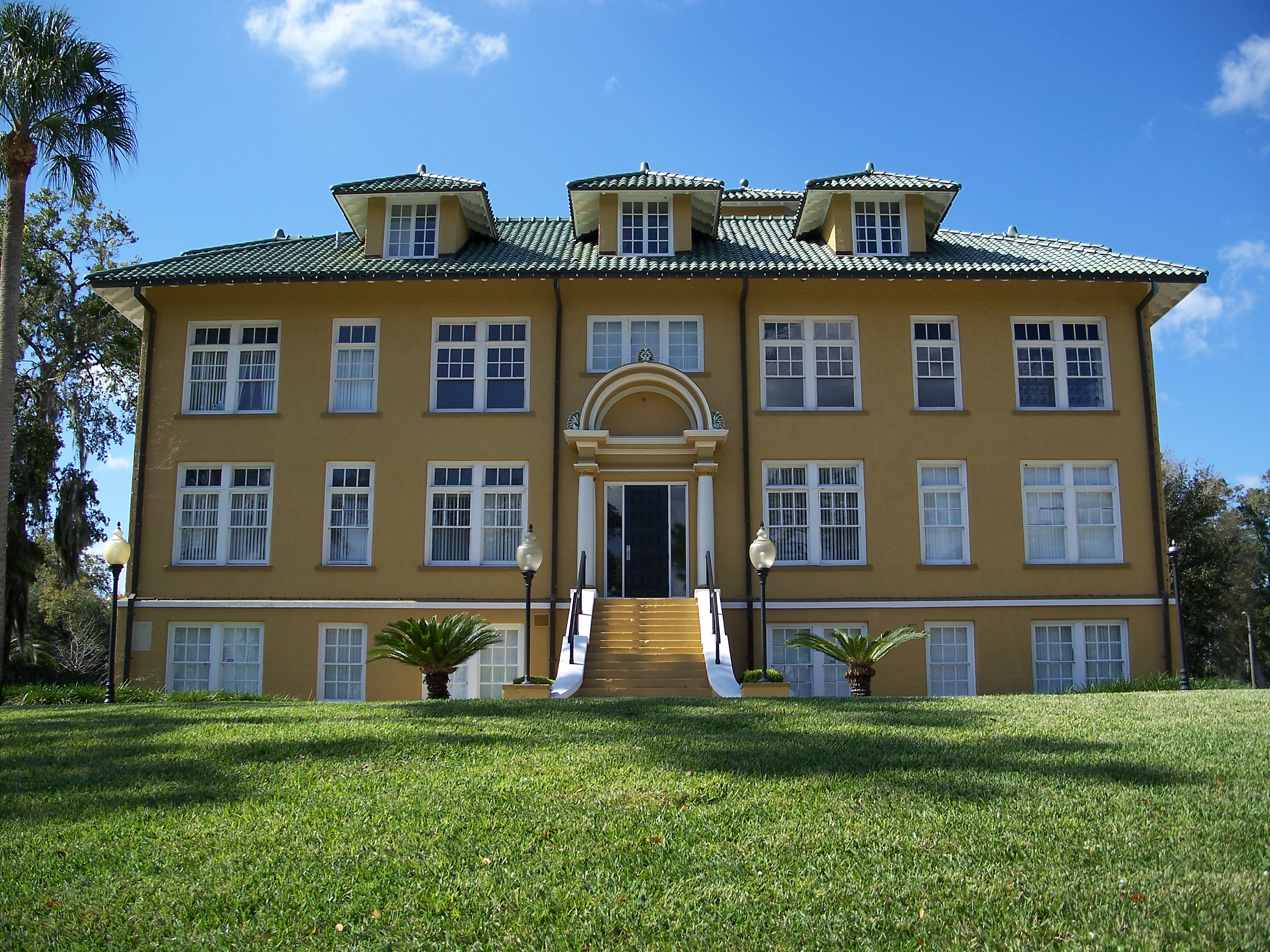
Old DeLand Colored Hospital

- 1924 The DeLand Hotel, now DeLand Artisan Inn, 215 S. Woodland Blvd., DeLand
- 1926 DeLand City Hall, Florida Ave., between New York and Howry Avenues (demolished in 2007).
- 1926 "Tuxedo House", 738 N. Tuxedo Avenue, University Terrace, DeLand
- 1926 "Casa de Rosa", 321 E. Pennsylvania Avenue, University Terrace, DeLand
- 1926 Smith Hall, the John J. Peacock Residence, 717 N. Amelia Ave., University Terrace, DeLand
- 1926 Old DeLand Colored Hospital, Stone Street
- 1929, the DeLand Band Shell at Veterans Park, between Rich and Indiana (demolished in 1950)
- 1936 Commons Building, West end of Bert Fish Dr., (burned in 1954)
- 1945 Music Building, Stetson University, DeLand, Florida
- 1952 Fish Memorial Hospital, DeLand, Florida
