= SLH =

SLH may refer to:

- Siu Lam Hospital, a hospital in Tuen Mun, Hong Kong
- Small Luxury Hotels of the World, partners of Hilton Worldwide
- SLH Transport, Kingston, Ontario, Canada
- Southern Lushootseed dialect (ISO 639-3: slh)
- Stockton-Lindquist House, DeLand, Florida, US

== Mathematics ==
- Lemniscate elliptic functions § Hyperbolic lemniscate functions
- SLH-DSA, the Stateless Hash-Based Digital Signature Standard for post-quantum cryptography

== Transportation ==
- Cheboygan County Airport, Michigan, US, FAA code
- PNR South Long Haul rail system, Philippines
- Vanua Lava Airport, Vanuatu, IATA code
