= Kilkoff House =

Historic house in Florida, United States

- U.S. National Register of Historic Places
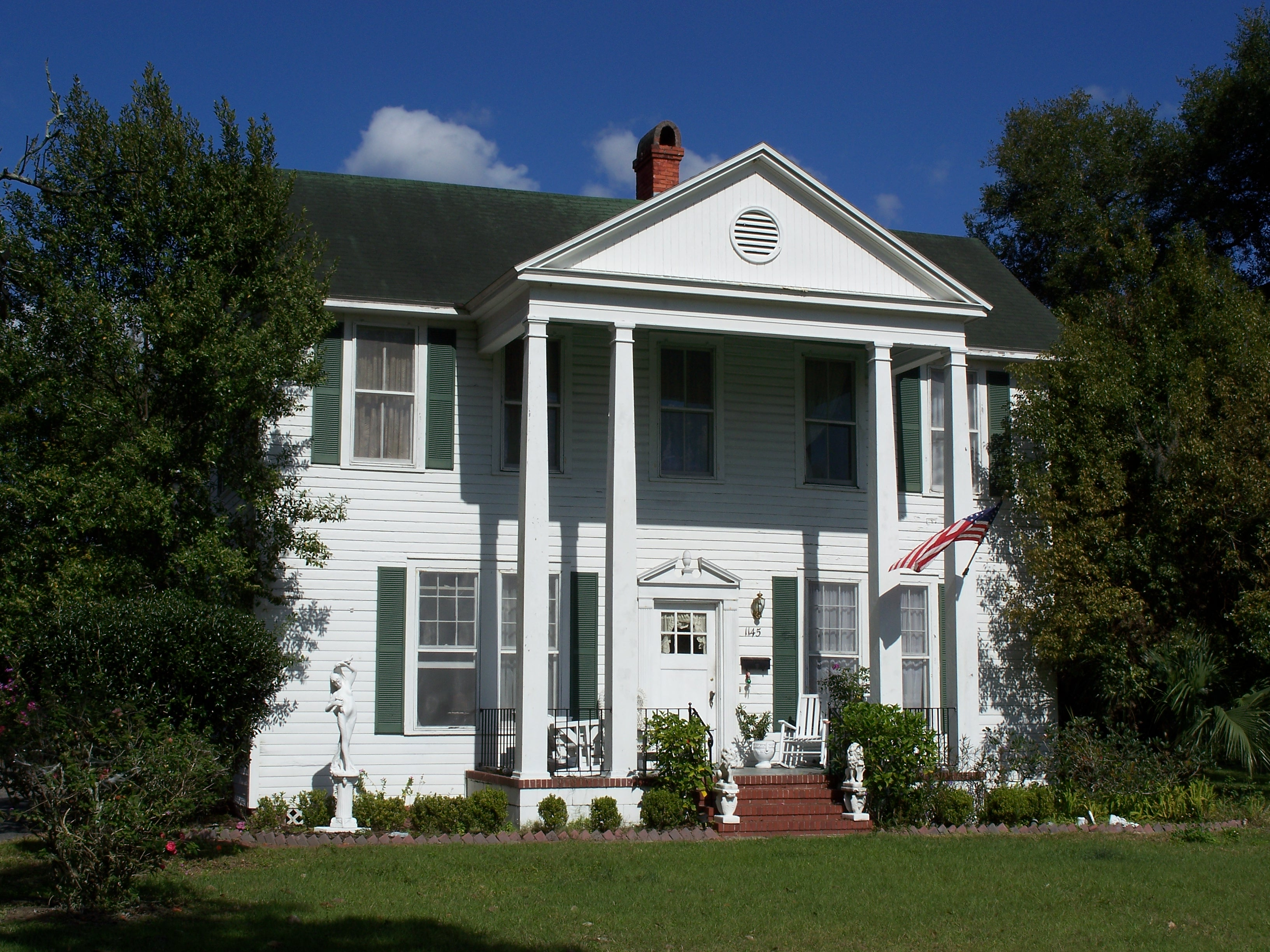

- Location within Volusia County
- Location: 1145 West New York Avenue, DeLand, Florida United States
- Coordinates: 29°1′42″N 81°19′33″W
- Area: 1.47 acres (0.59 ha)
- Built: 1878
- Architectural style: Classical Revival
- NRHP reference No.: 97001216
- Added to NRHP: October 8, 1997

The Kilkoff House is a historic house located in DeLand, Florida. It is locally significant as one of DeLand's earliest buildings, and also as a good example of vernacular construction that historically underwent modification to suit the needs and tastes of its owners.

== Description and history ==
Constructed in 1878, and altered up until 1920, the residence is a two-story frame, vernacular building with Classical Revival elements, and a "T" footprint. Built on a foundation of brick piers, the exterior is of horizontal siding, and the cross gable roof is surfaced with asphalt shingles and pierced by one brick chimney. The property contains two non-contributing resources: a swimming pool and a garage. As of 2025, it remains a private residence.

It was added to the National Register of Historic Places on October 8, 1997.

== Gallery ==
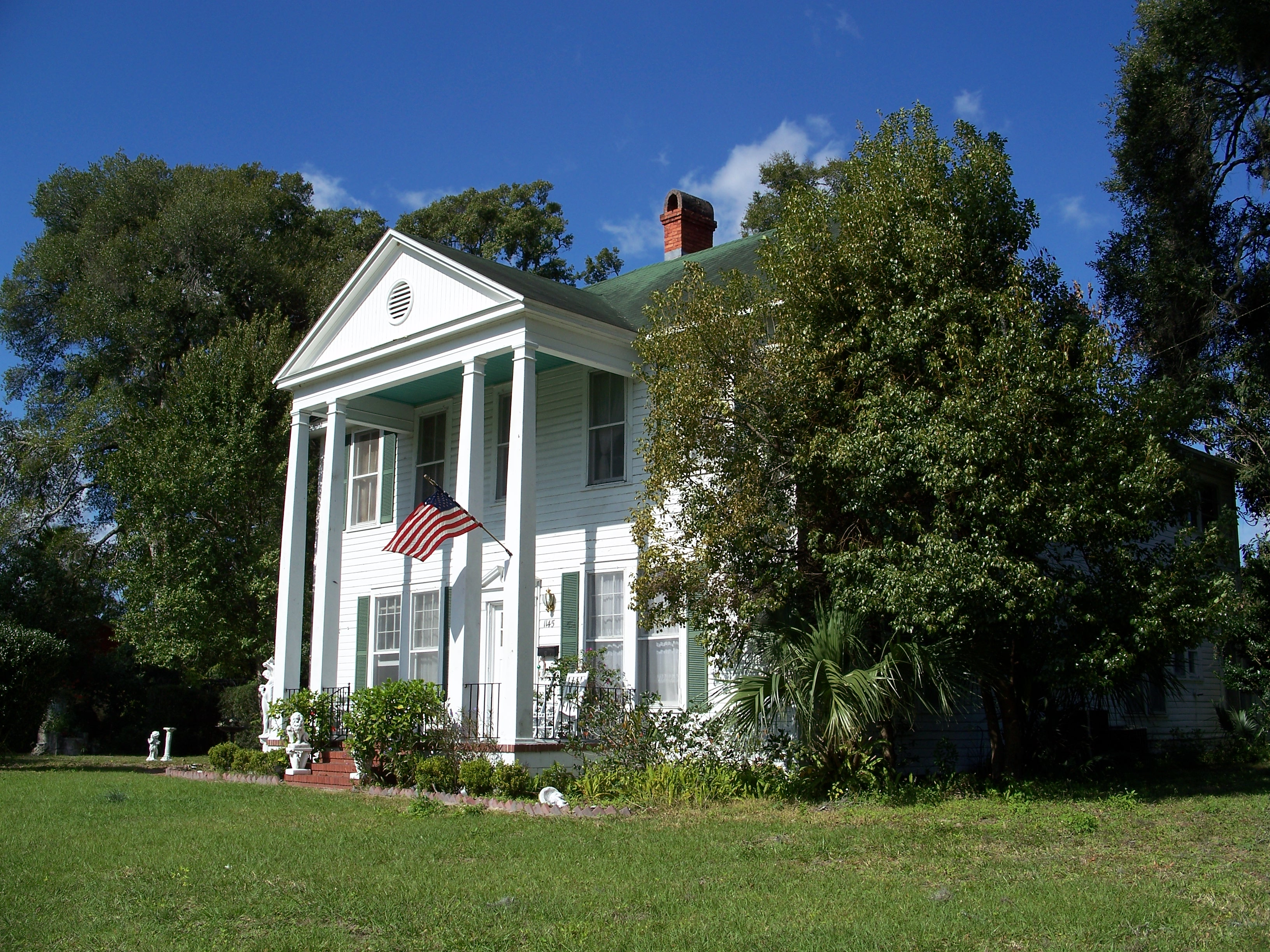

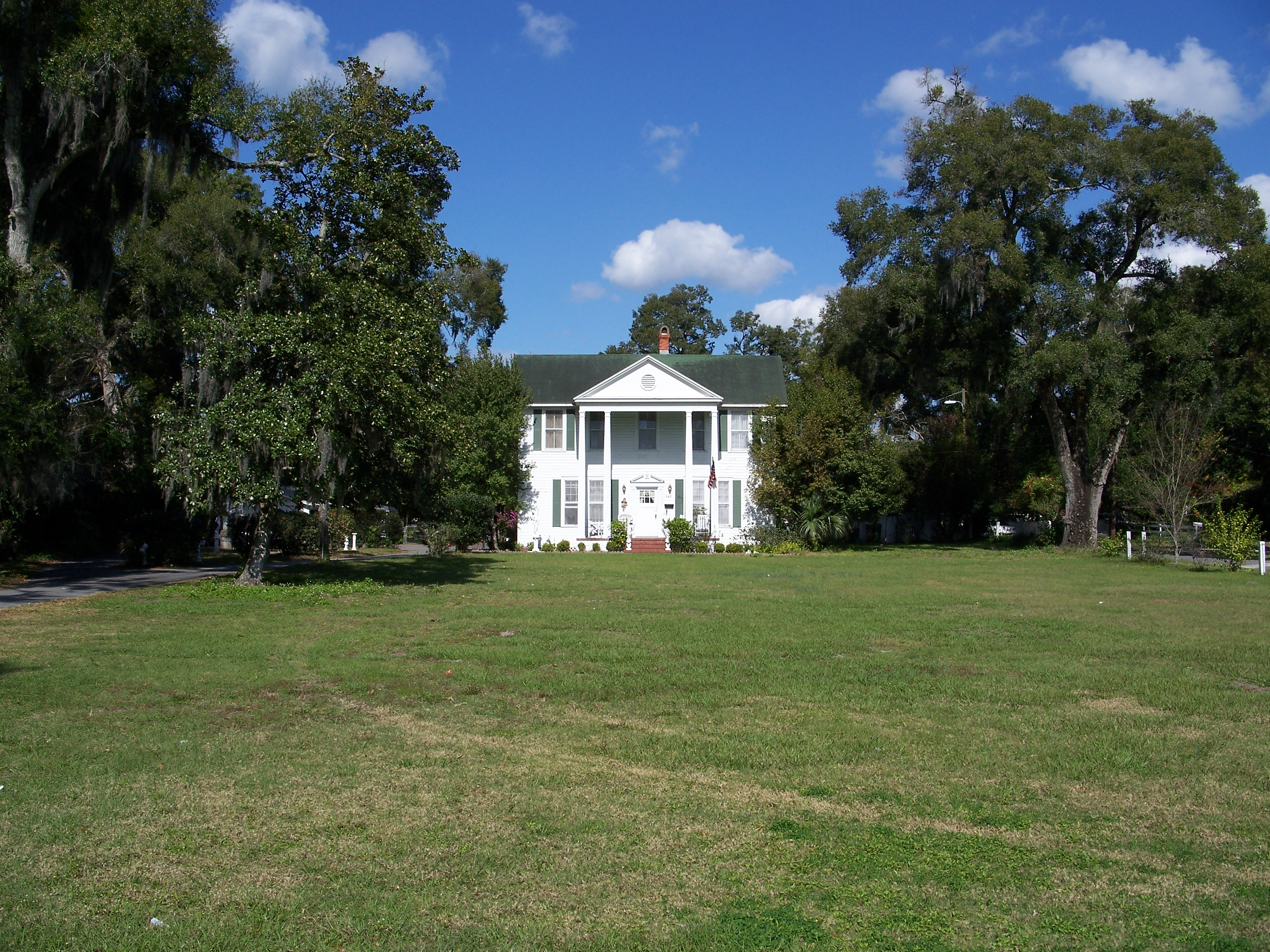
