= Alexander Haynes House =

Historic house in Florida, United States

- U.S. National Register of Historic Places
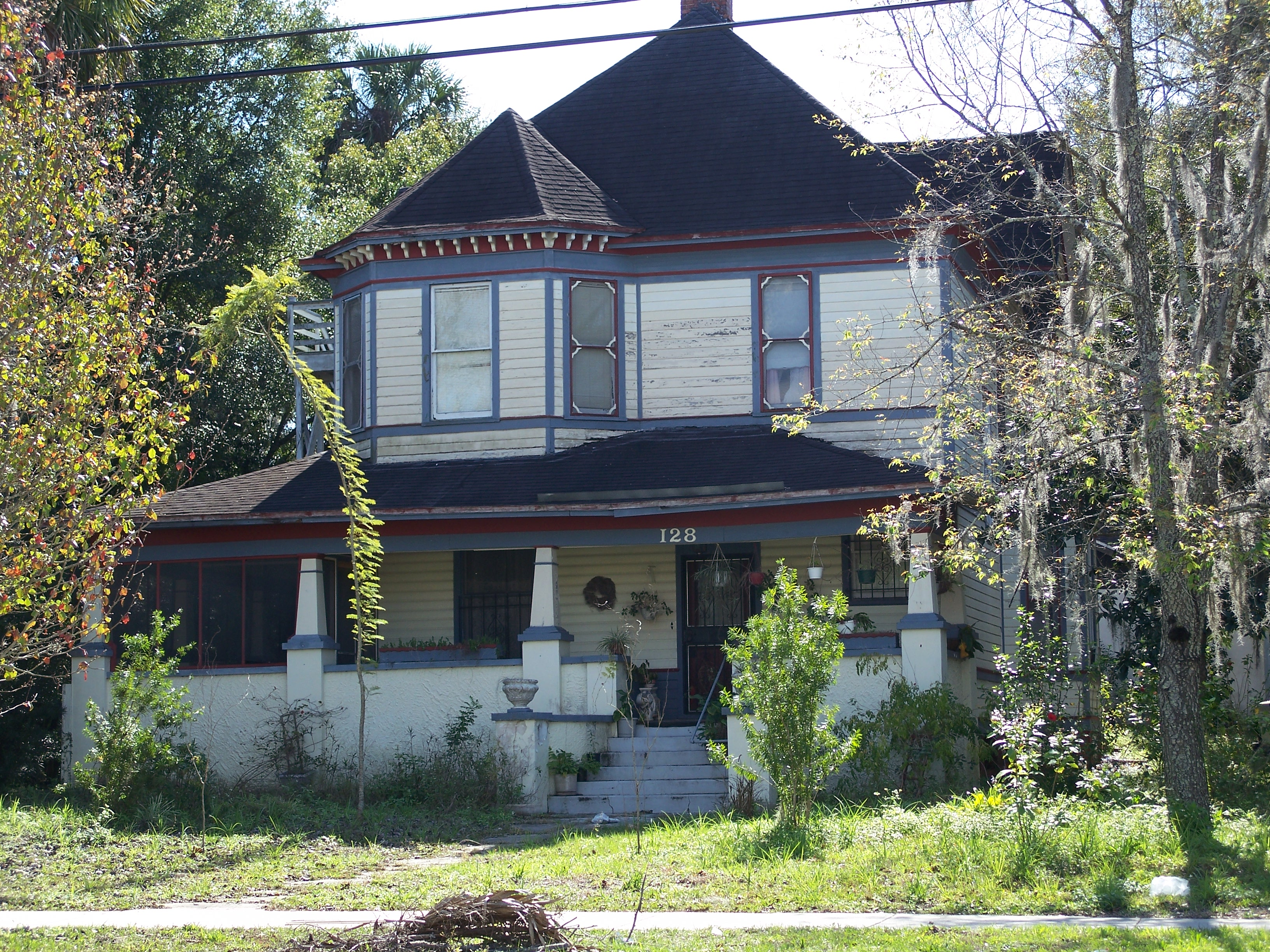

- Location within Volusia County
- Location: DeLand, Florida
- Coordinates: 29°1′33″N 81°18′18″W
- Built: 1896
- Architectural style: Queen Anne
- NRHP reference No.: 95001070
- Added to NRHP: September 7, 1995

The Alexander Haynes House is a historic house located at 128 West Howry Avenue in DeLand, Florida. It is the oldest Queen Anne style home in the city. The building displays craftsmanship typically applied to large, formal residences. Completed in 1896, the building retains its integrity to a high degree.

== Description and history ==
The house is a good example of a late 19th century Queen Anne style residence. The building is 2 1/2 stories, measures approximately thirty by fifty feet, and has an irregular footprint.

It was added to the National Register of Historic Places on September 7, 1995.

== References and external links ==
- Volusia County listings at National Register of Historic Places
