= Volusia County Fair and Expo Center =

Convention center in DeLand, Florida

Coordinates: 29°0′54″N 81°13′25″W

The Volusia County Fair and Youth Show is a combination fairgrounds and convention center located in DeLand, Florida. It consists of two indoor arenas and two exhibit halls:

== The arenas ==
- Tommy Lawrence Arena is a 3,000-seat outdoor arena with 22,400 square feet (2,080 m^{2}) of arena floor space. It is used for sporting events, circuses, and concerts (capacity up to 4,500.), among other events. Its arena ceiling height is between 24 and 34 feet (10 m).
- Townsend Livestock Pavilion Arena is a 1,300-seat outdoor arena with 10,000 square feet (1,000 m^{2}) of floor space and is used for smaller events. It has a ceiling height of between 20 and 48 feet (15 m).

== Exhibit halls ==
- The Townsend Livestock Pavilion features 18,270 square feet (1,697 m^{2}) of space at its exhibit halls. Its ceiling height is between 12 and 16 feet (5 m).
- Smaller trade shows are held at the Talton Exhibit Hall which has 8,100 square feet (750 m^{2}) of exhibit space.

All four venues have a total of 58,770 square feet (5,460 m^{2}) of exhibit space. All four are used either separately or combined for conventions, trade shows and other events, including the Volusia County Fair. All four have restrooms, concession stands, and state-of-the-art PA systems.

== See also ==
- List of convention centers in the United States

== Other facilities ==
There are 102 spaces for RVs at the fairgrounds and lighted parking for 4,000 cars.
