= Yemassee Settlement =

Residential neighborhood in DeLand, Florida

The Yemassee Settlement was a residential neighborhood developed in DeLand, Florida for African Americans. It was planned during the Progressive Era. The Greater Union Baptist Church was built in the area in 1893. It is a site on Florida's Black Heritage Trail.
