= Downtown DeLand Historic District =

Historic district in Florida, United States

- U.S. National Register of Historic Places
- U.S. Historic district
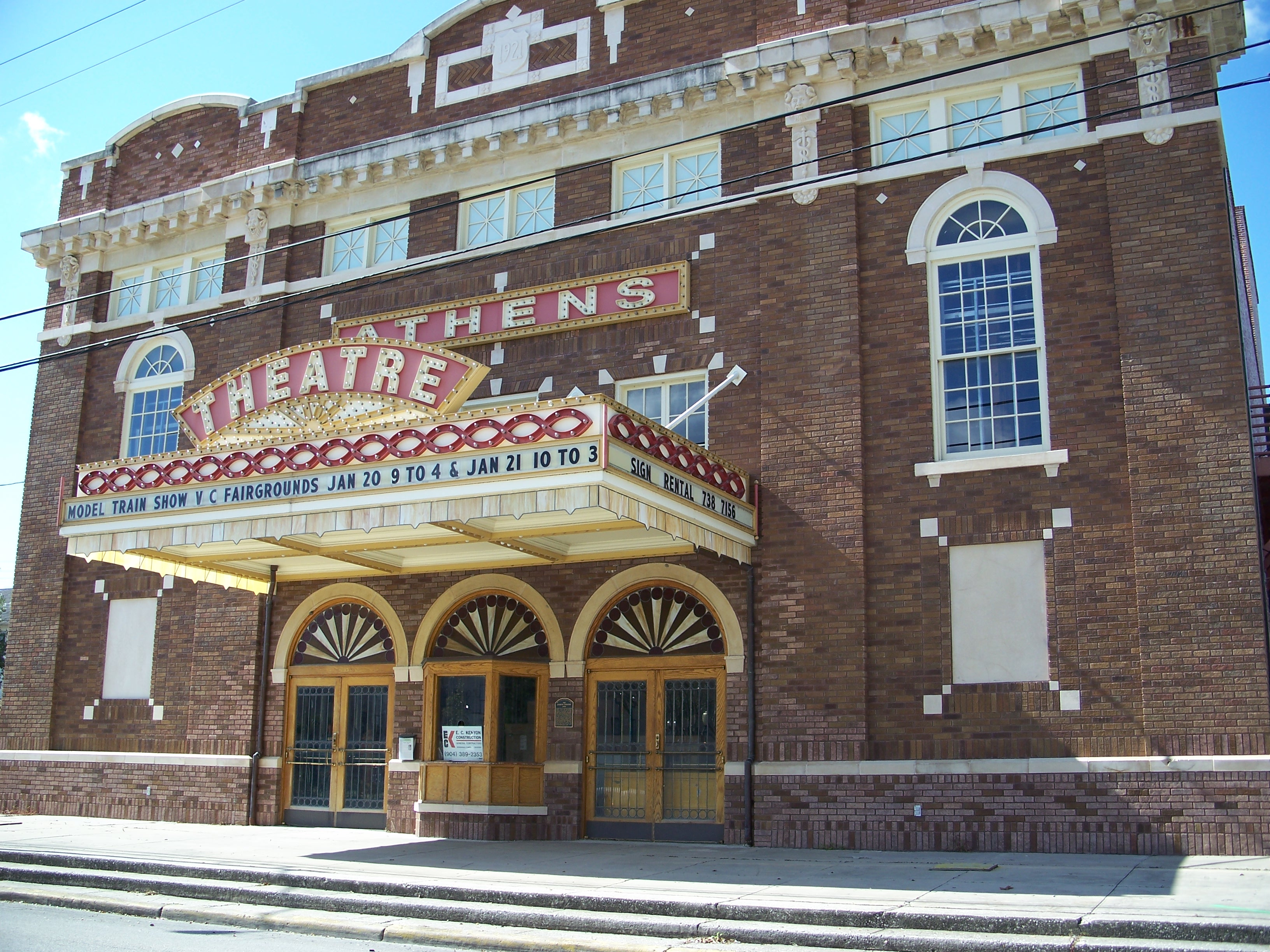
- Athens Theatre, in historic district

- Location within Volusia County
- Location: DeLand, Florida United States
- Coordinates: 29°1′39″N 81°18′17″W
- Area: 300 acres (1.2 km^{2})
- NRHP reference No.: 87001796
- Added to NRHP: December 23, 1987

The Downtown DeLand Historic District (also known as downtown DeLand) is a U.S. historic district (designated on December 23, 1987) located in DeLand, Florida. The district is bounded by Florida & Rich Avenues, Woodland Boulevard, & Howry Avenue. It contains 68 historic buildings.

== Gallery ==
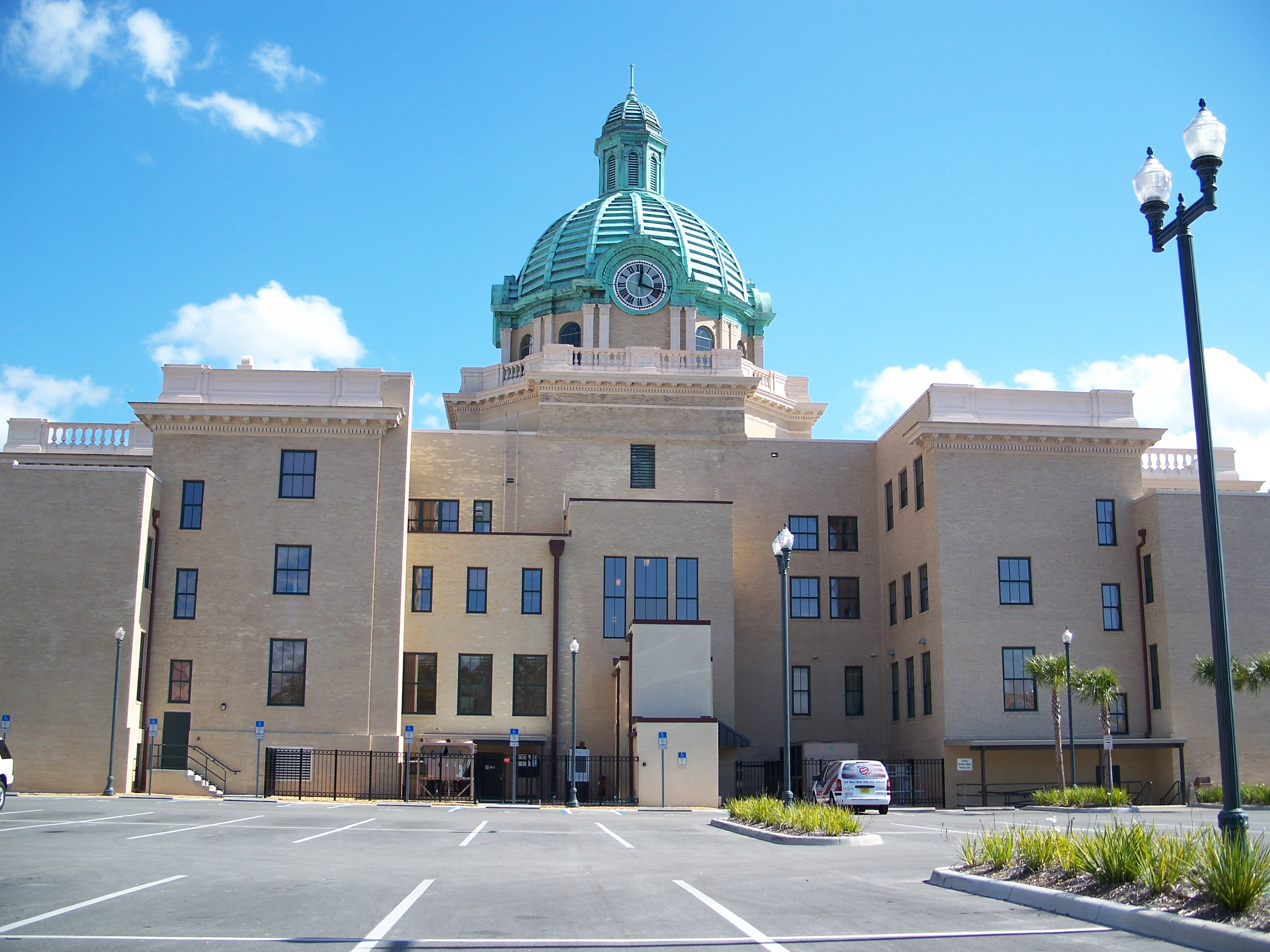
Old Volusia County court house. Now a part of county administration.

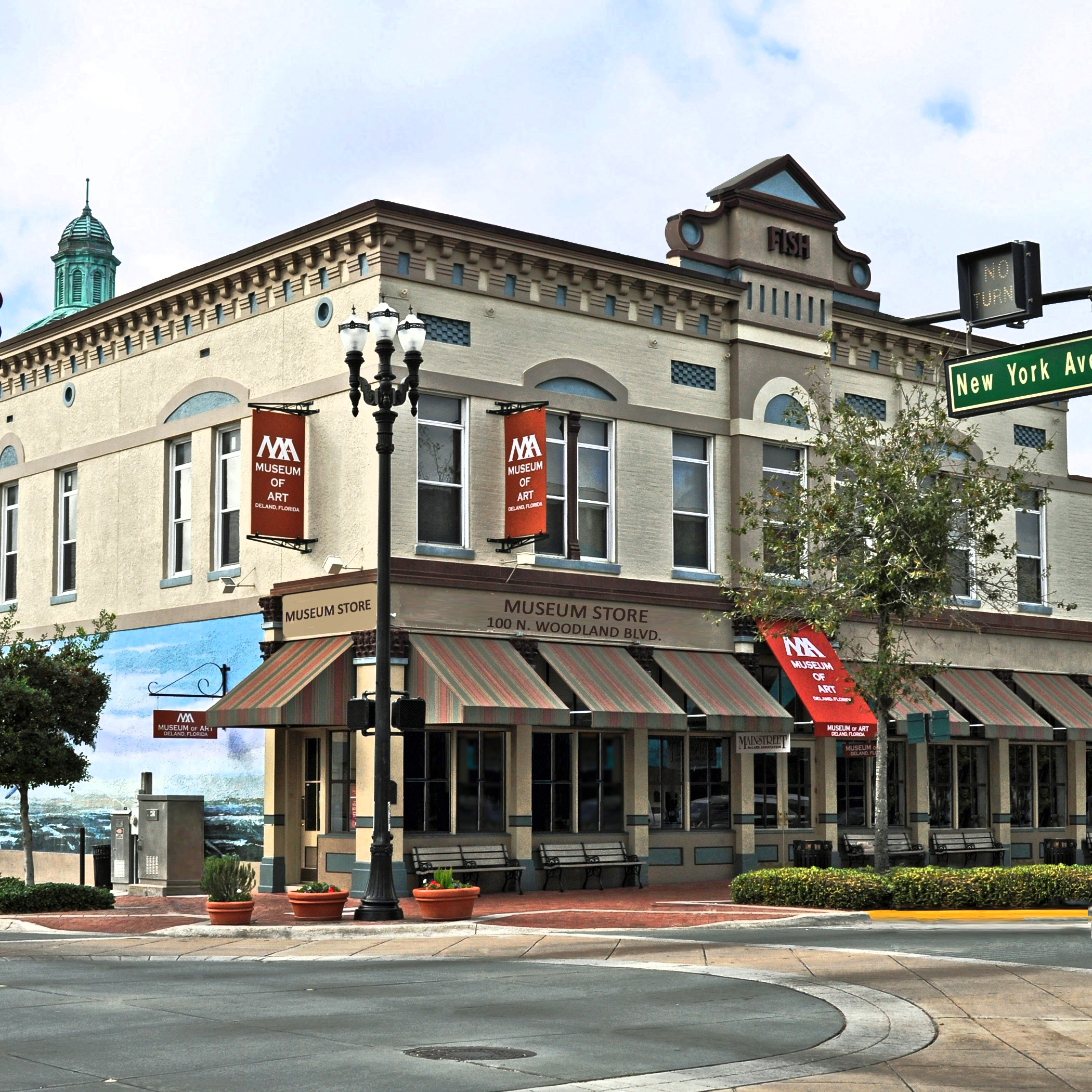
The Miller-Fish Building on US 17/92 and FL 44, now part of the "Museum of Florida Art."

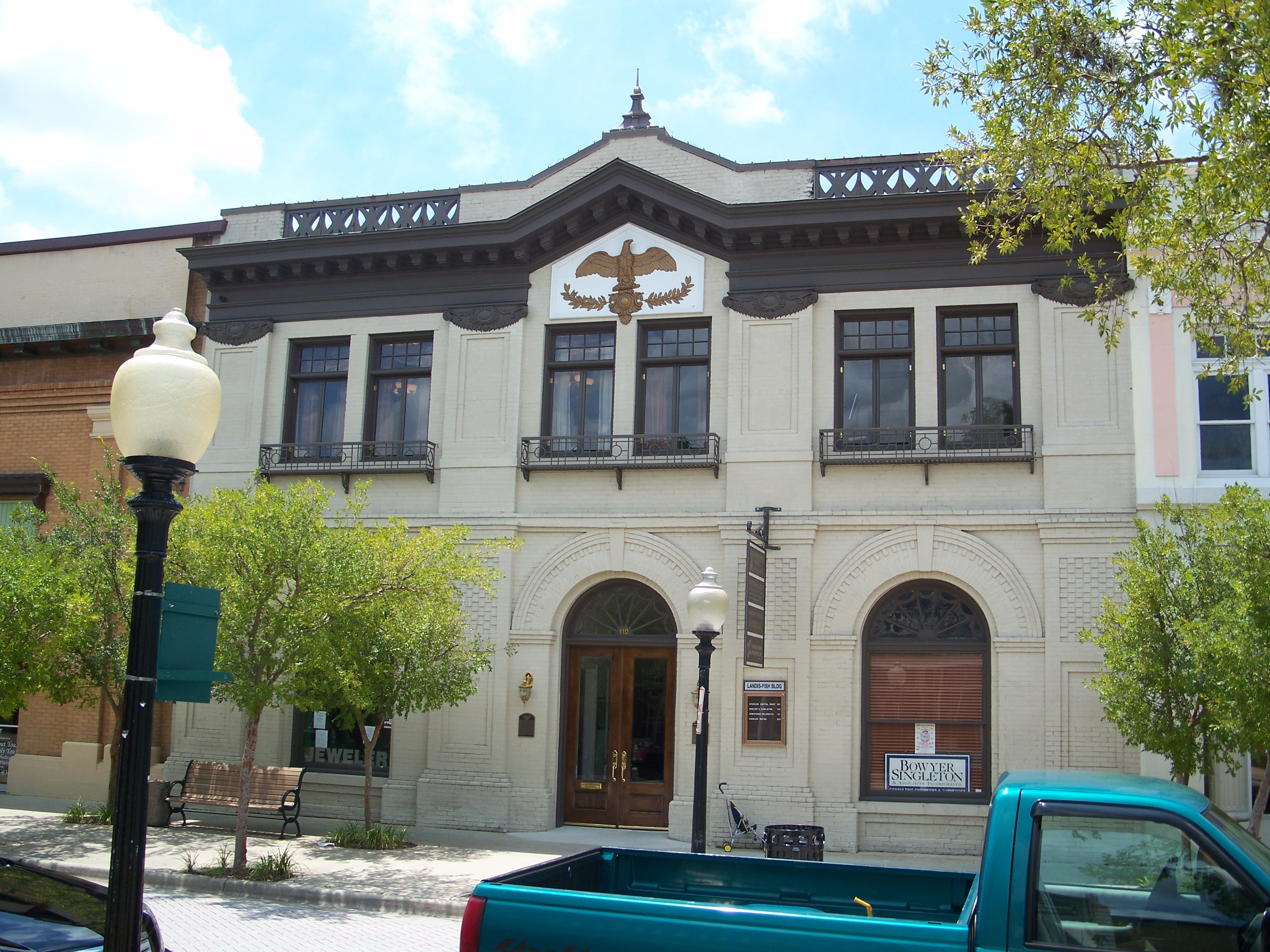
The Landis-Fish Building on Indiana Avenue. Today, this building is painted blue.
