= Museum of Art - DeLand =

Museum in DeLand, Florida, U.S.

Museum of Art - DeLand, Florida
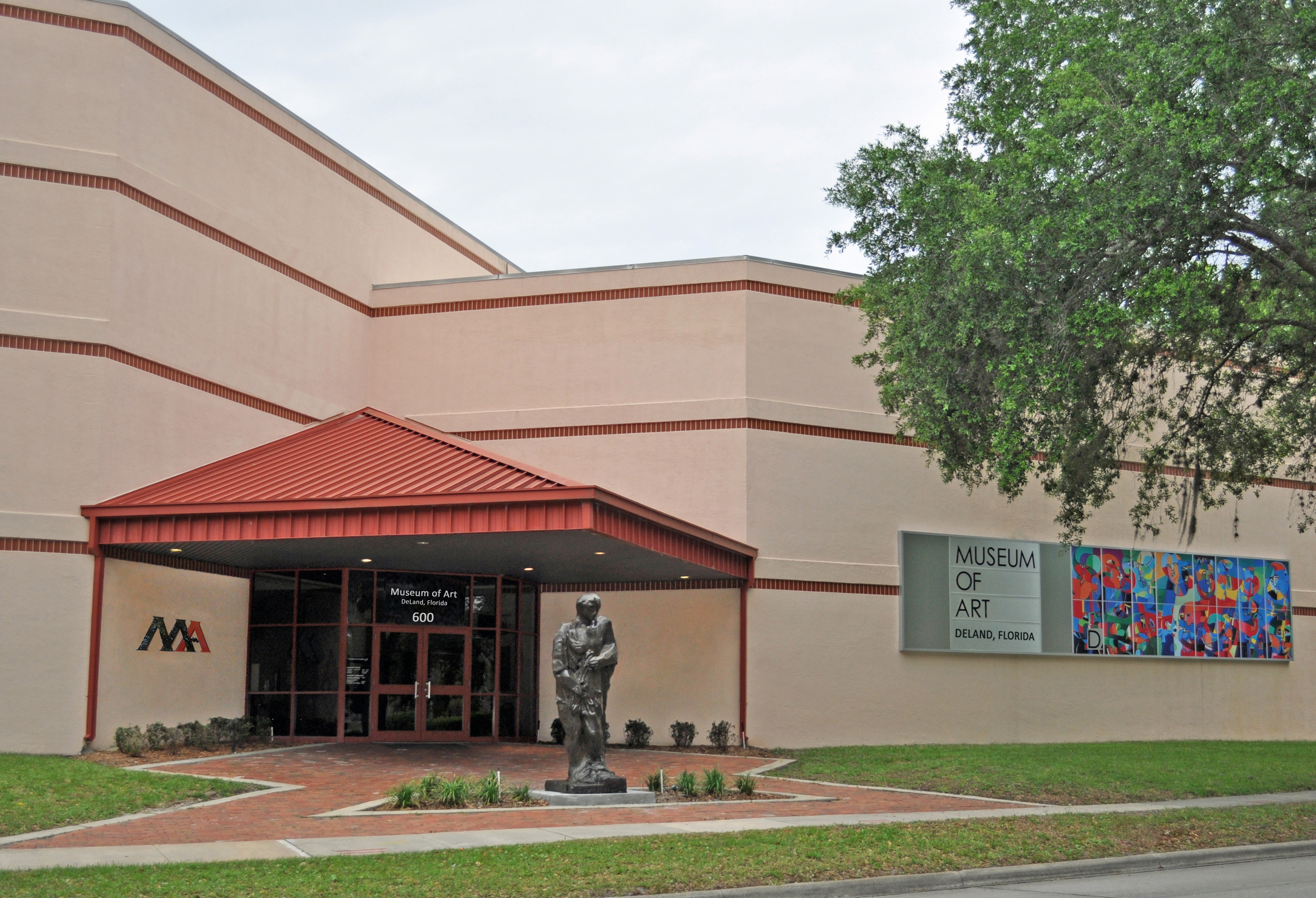
- 600 North Woodland Boulevard location across from Stetson University

- Location within Volusia County
- Established: 1951
- Location: 600 North Woodland Boulevard DeLand, Florida; 100 North Woodland Boulevard DeLand, Florida
- Coordinates: 29.03780°N 81.30412°W
- Type: Art museum
- Director: George Bolge
- Curator: David Fithian
- Website: moartdeland.org

The Museum of Art - DeLand, Florida (formerly the Museum of Florida Art) is a 501(c)(3) organization incorporated in the US state of Florida, and is a member of the American Alliance of Museums and the Florida Association of Museums. It is a community visual arts museum dedicated to the collecting, preservation, study, display and educational use of the fine arts. In addition to the permanent collection, the museum is host to exhibitions, gallery talks and receptions, educational programming, master artist workshops and special events throughout the year.

== History ==
The museum was established in 1951 by the American Association of University Women. Its campus includes a 23,000-square-foot (2,100 m^{2}) arts facility completed in 1991, and the adjacent Evans C. and Betty Drees Johnson Children’s Art Center, which opened in 2010. In 2013 the museum expanded to include 2,970 square feet (276 m^{2}) of modern gallery space and a 2,239-square-foot (208 m^{2}) Museum Store located at 100 N. Woodland Boulevard in the center of historic downtown DeLand.

== Education ==
The museum provides programming to various age groups, including lectures, discussions, gallery talks, tours and field studies, art classes and workshops, art camps and community outreach presentations.

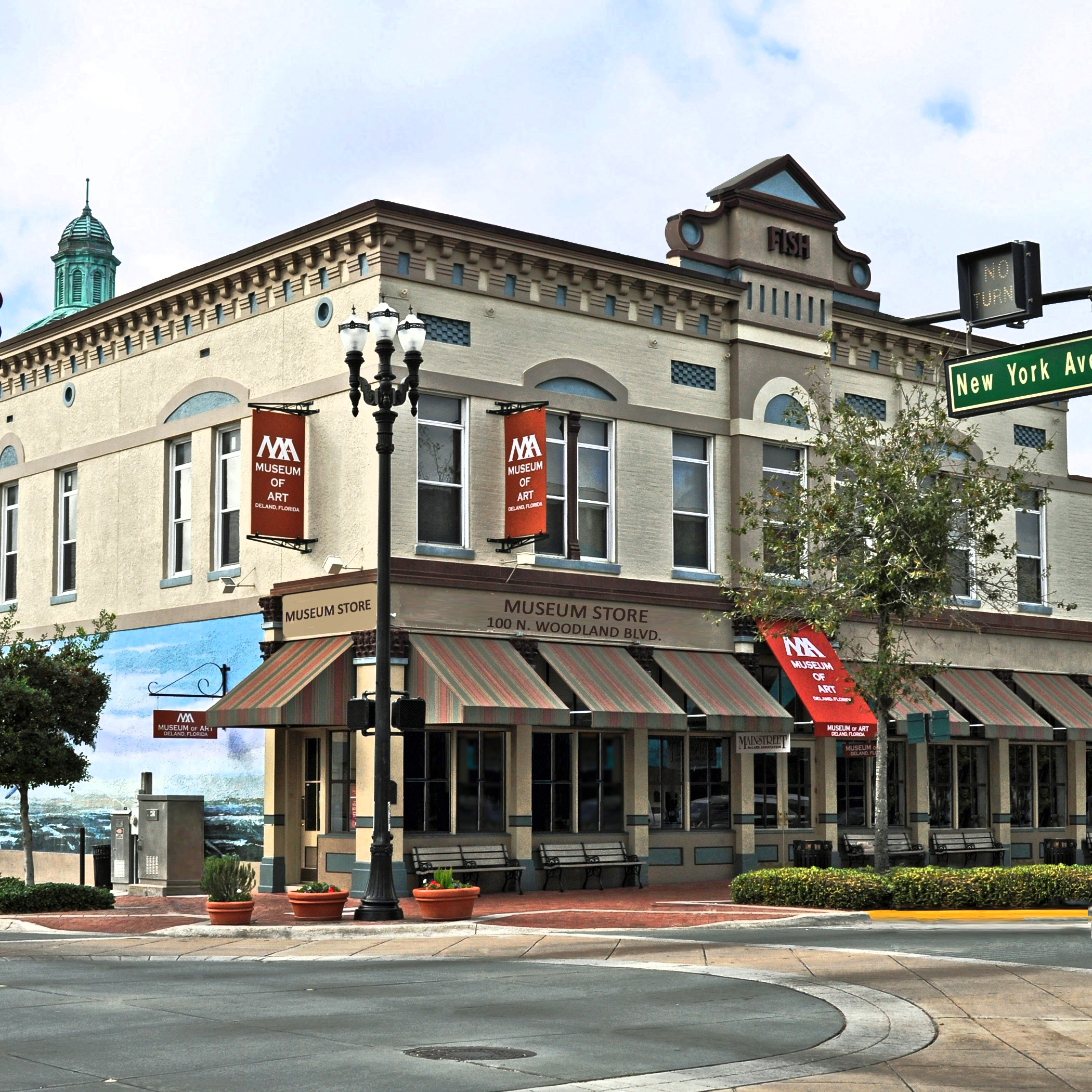
Museum of Art - DeLand

== Past exhibitions ==
The museum has hosted to multiple exhibitions by internationally renowned artists such as Mateo Blanco, Sandro Chia, Stephen Althouse, and many more. The museum's 2013 exhibition, "Forging an Identity: Contemporary Latin American Art", presented works by Fernando Botero, Tomás Sánchez and Roberto Matta.

=== Selected exhibitions ===
- May 23 – August 24, 2014 Collector’s Choice: Samuel Blatt Collection
- June 13 – 29, 2014 Brightest Africa
- January 17 – May 11, 2014 Jill Cannady: Idea & Medium
- October 10, 2013 – January 5, 2014 Small Masterworks: Butler Institute of American Art Collection
- April 19 - August 18, 2013 Sequined Sentinels: Haitian Flags from the Collection of Candice Russell
- December 6, 2012 - April 7, 2013 Florida Masters I Exhibitions
- July 27 – November 25, 2012 Survival Series: Barbara Neijna
- February 22, 2012 - Harold Garde: Painting 50 years
