= Stockton-Lindquist House =

Historic house in Florida, United States

- U.S. National Register of Historic Places
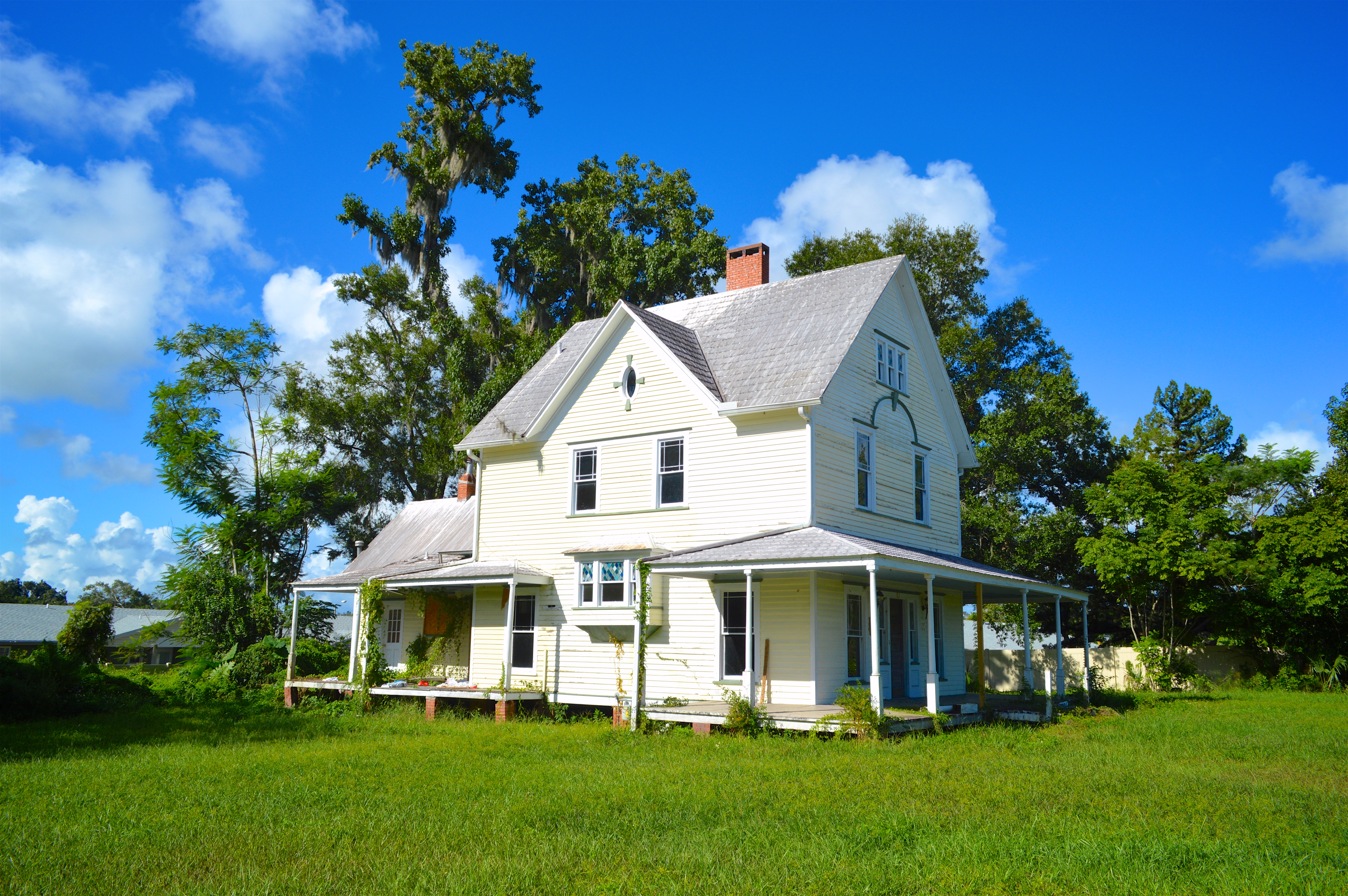
- House in September 2018

- Location within Volusia County
- Location: DeLand, Florida United States
- Coordinates: 29°0′48″N 81°17′59″W
- NRHP reference No.: 04000626
- Added to NRHP: June 22, 2004

The Stockton-Lindquist House (SLH) is the oldest historic home in the small town of DeLand, Florida and one of the oldest Historic Sites in Volusia County, FL. SLH was built in 1870. It is located at 244 East Beresford Avenue. SLH has been designated four times, each time highlighting its important aspects and contributions to Volusia County, FL. On June 22, 2004, it was added to the U.S. National Register of Historic Places. SLH has also being designated a Florida Archaeological Site under the project name Andrew and Mary Lindquist Aboriginal site. It was recognized by the Florida Bureau of Folklife and has been recently designated on the Volusia County Register of Historic Places.

On July 4, 2008, the Stockton-Lindquist House became the home of the Stockton-Lindquist House Foundation for Historic Preservation, Inc, a 501 (C)(4). The foundation is organized exclusively for civics, social welfare, religious, charitable, educational, and scientific purposes, including, for such purposes as the restoration and preservation in perpetuity of historic buildings and properties, and to increase the sum of historic knowledge for the benefit of all mankind.

== References and external links ==
Media related to Stockton-Lindquist House at Wikimedia Commons

- Volusia County listings at the National Register of Historic Places
- Stockton-Lindquist House Foundation for Historic Preservation, Inc

== Gallery ==
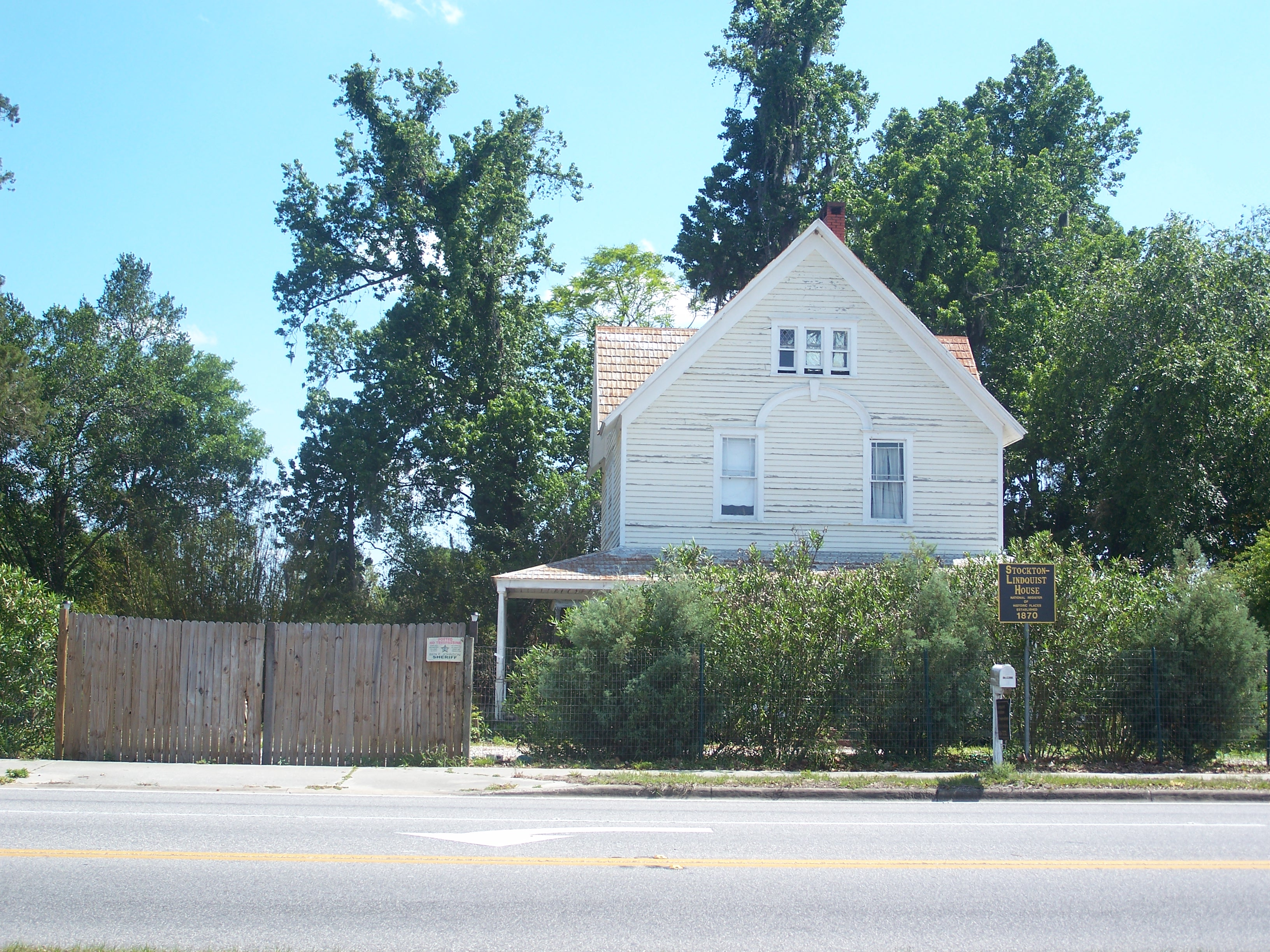

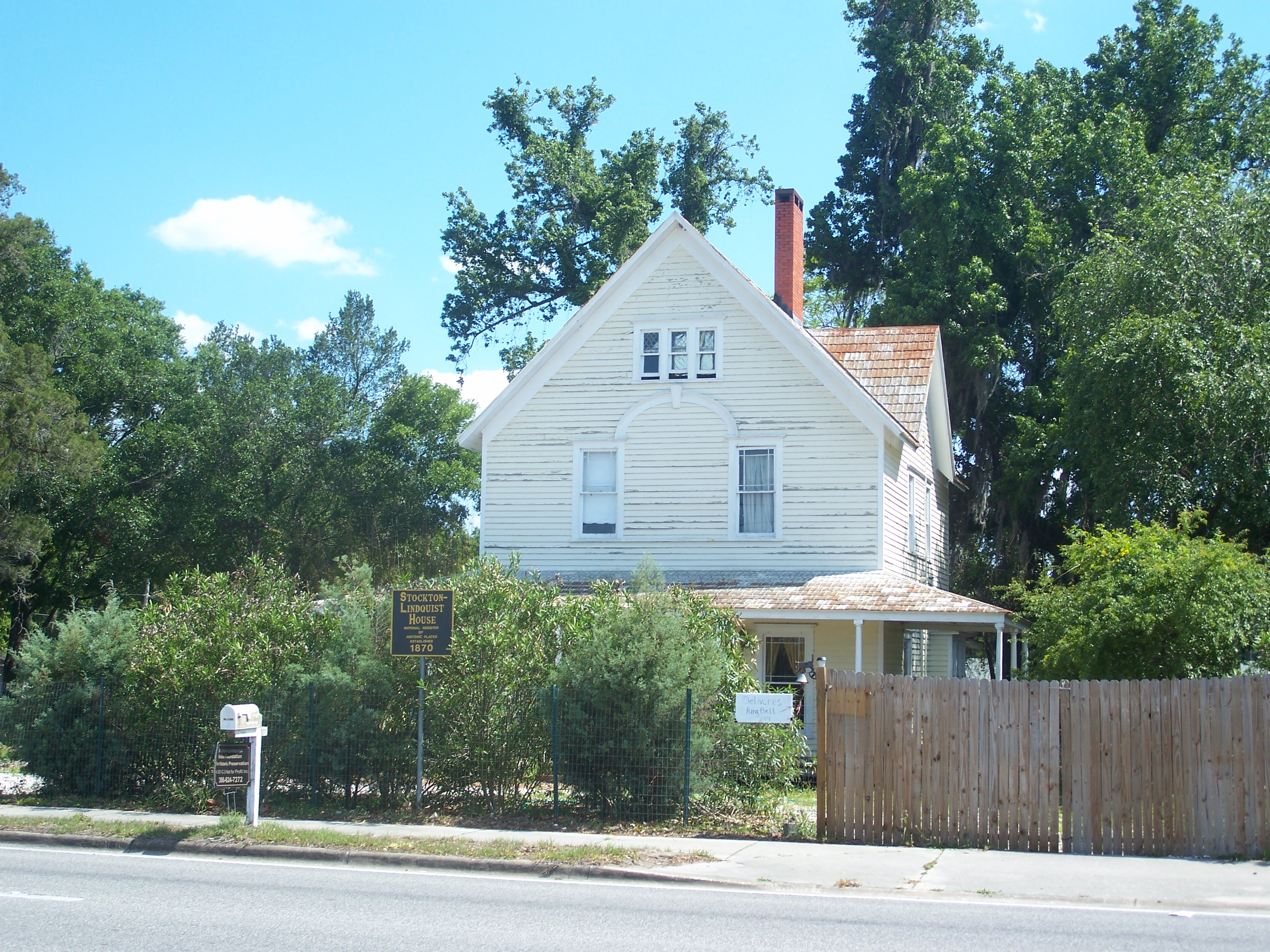
Closer view
