= DeLand, Florida =

- City
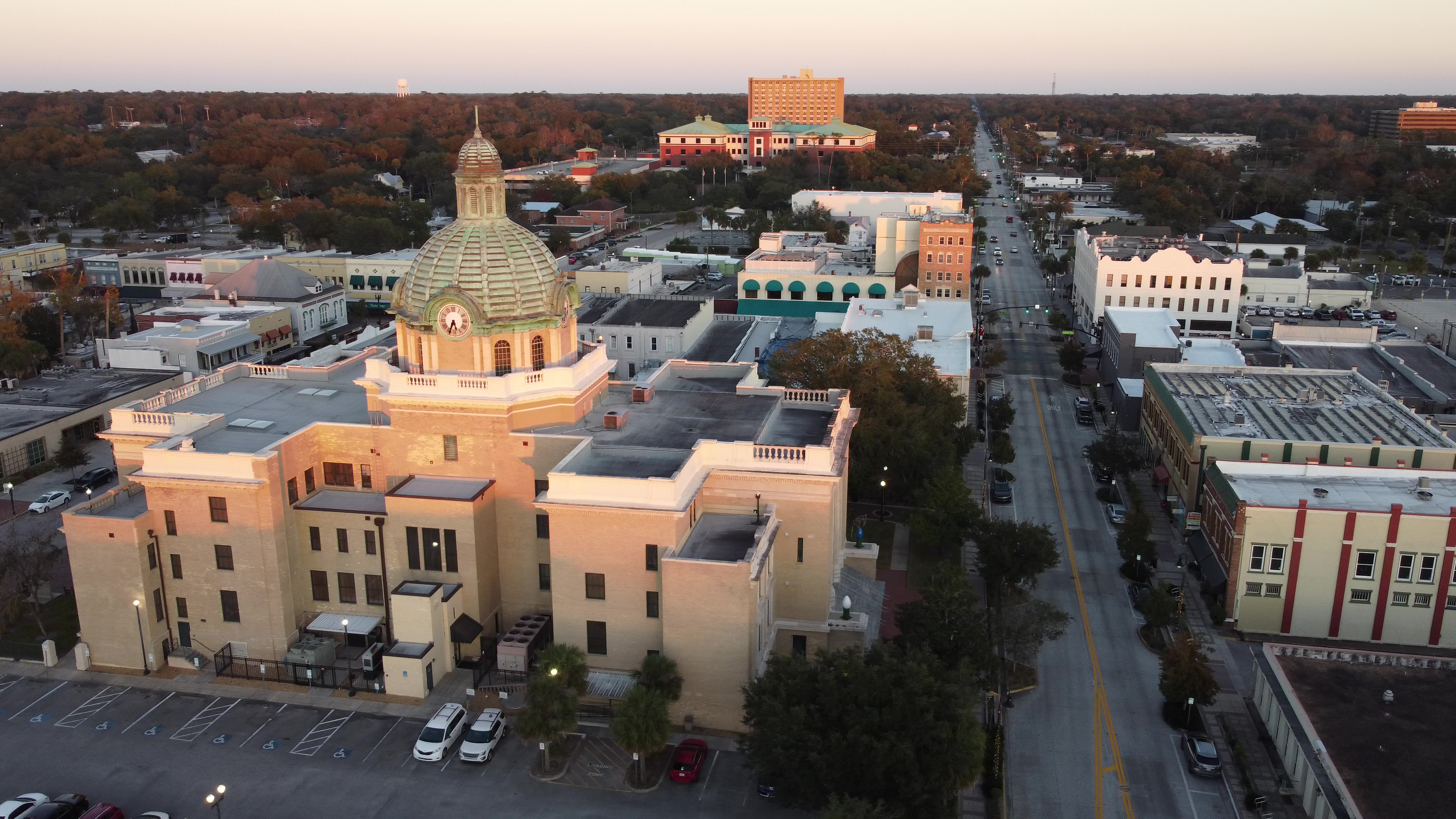
- Downtown DeLand

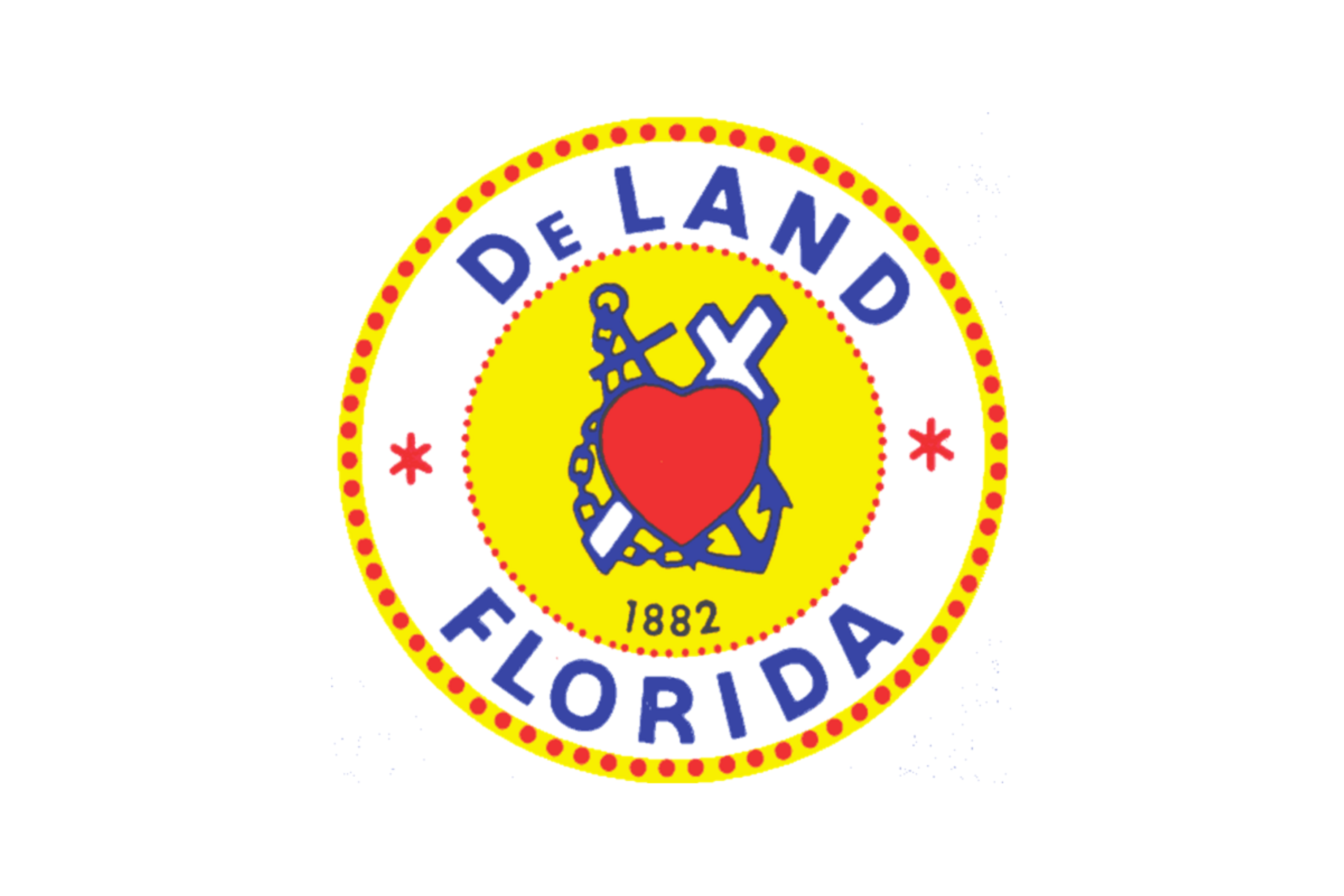
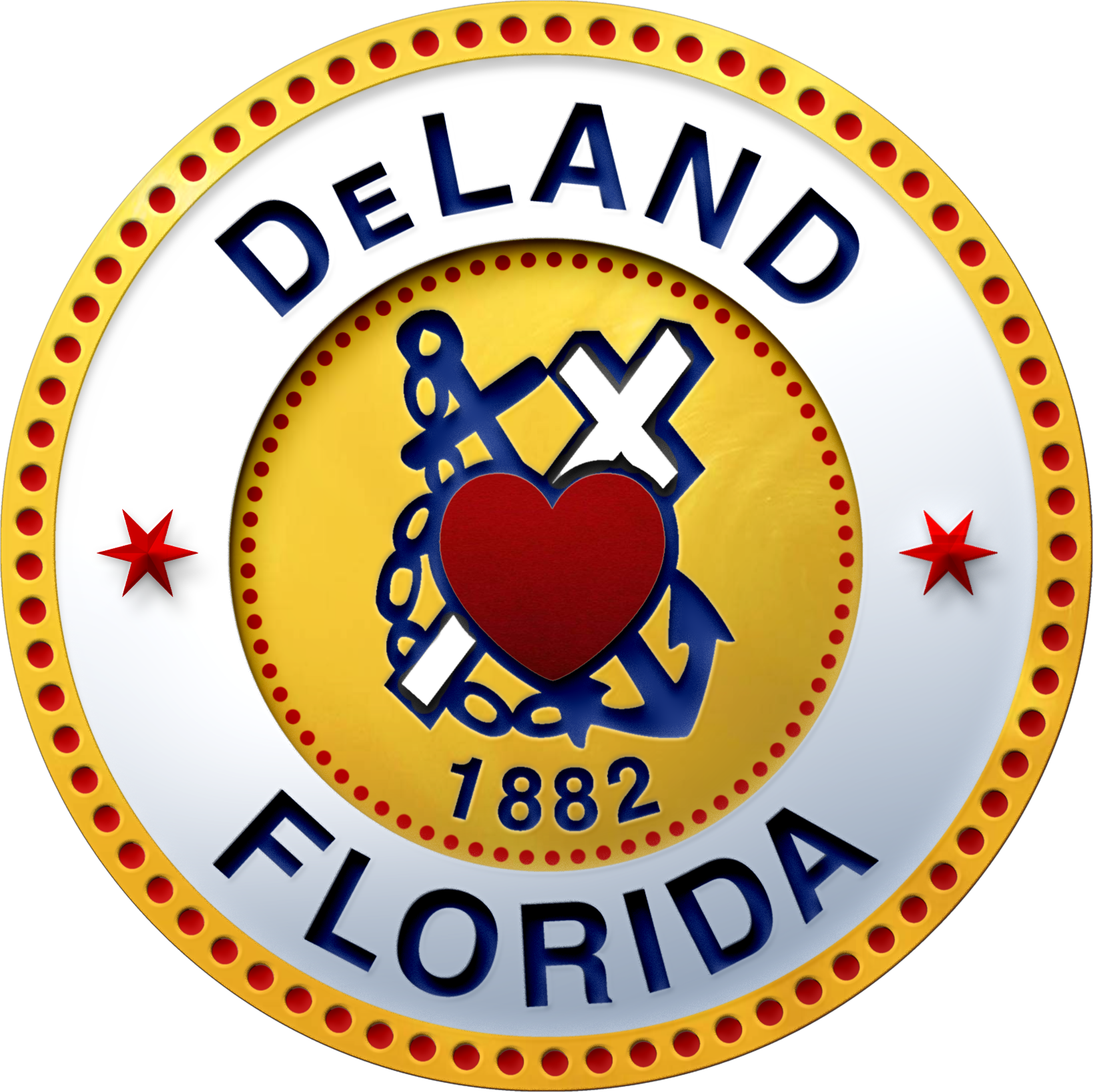
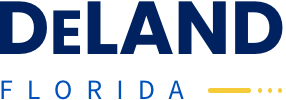
- Flag Seal Logo
- Nickname: "The Athens of Florida"
- Location in Volusia County and the state of Florida
- Coordinates: 29°01′30″N 81°16′41″W
- Country: United States
- State: Florida
- County: Volusia
- Settled (Persimmon Hollow): 1846-1876
- Settled (DeLand): December 6, 1876
- Incorporated (City of DeLand): 1882
- Named for: Henry Addison DeLand

Government
  - Type: Commission–Manager

Area
  - Total: 19.51 sq mi (50.52 km^{2})
  - Land: 19.28 sq mi (49.93 km^{2})
  - Water: 0.23 sq mi (0.59 km^{2})
- Elevation: 72 ft (22 m)

Population (2020)
  - Total: 37,351
  - Estimate (2025): 46,346
  - Density: 1,937.5/sq mi (748.06/km^{2})
- Demonym: DeLandite
- Time zone: UTC-5 (Eastern (EST))
  - Summer (DST): UTC-4 (EDT)
- ZIP code(s): 32720–32724
- Area code: 386
- FIPS code: 12-16875
- GNIS feature ID: 2404201
- Website: www.deland.org

DeLand is a city in and the county seat of Volusia County, Florida, United States. It is a part of the Deltona–Daytona Beach–Ormond Beach metropolitan area. As of the 2020 census, DeLand had a population of 37,351.

The city was founded in 1876, and was named for its founder, Henry Addison DeLand. DeLand is home to Stetson University, Florida's oldest private college, as well as the Museum of Art - DeLand. The DeLand Municipal Airport serves as an uncontrolled general-aviation reliever airport to commercial operations at Daytona Beach International Airport (DAB), Orlando Sanford International Airport (SFB), and Orlando International Airport (MCO).

== History ==
Bird's-eye view of DeLand, 1884

DeLand was previously known as Persimmon Hollow for the wild persimmon trees that grow around the natural springs, and the area was originally accessible only by steamboat up the St. Johns River.

The first settler in the area was probably Ruben Marsh. He first came to Florida during the Seminole Indian War in 1841, during a scouting party that stopped at a lake area within the modern city limits, and in 1846, when the war ended, Ruben Marsh got married and moved to what is now known as DeLand. He bought a settlers claim, where he built a cabin for his family and started raising livestock.

Henry Addison DeLand, a baking soda magnate from Fairport, New York, visited there in 1876, and envisioned building a citrus, agricultural, and tourism center. He sold his northern business and hired people to clear land, lay out streets, erect buildings, and recruit settlers, most of whom came from upstate New York (though DeLand never lived in the city year-round). On December 6, 1876, at 2:00 pm, the settlers decided to rename the community from Persimmon Hollow to DeLand, in honor of his founding and helping develop its infrastructure.

In 1877, DeLand built a public school for the town. To enhance the community's stature and culture, and to enhance the value of his local real-estate holdings, in 1883, DeLand established DeLand Academy, Florida's first private college. However, in 1885, a freeze destroyed the orange crop. One story has it that DeLand had guaranteed settlers' investments as an inducement to relocate, so was obligated to buy back their ruined groves, though no hard evidence indicates that this took place. As for many other would-be real-estate magnates in the area at the time, his Florida investments were nearly worthless after the freeze, and he returned to his home in the North. DeLand entrusted the academy to his friend, John B. Stetson, a wealthy hat manufacturer from Philadelphia and one of the institution's founding trustees. In 1889, it was renamed John B. Stetson University in its patron's honor. In 1900, it founded the first law school in Florida (which relocated to Gulfport in 1954). Its various sports teams are called the Hatters.

The community was officially incorporated as the City of DeLand in 1882, and became the county seat of Volusia County in 1887. It was the first city in Florida to have electricity. According to city officials, minutes of the first City Commission meeting in 1882 show the city decided to create a seal with the emblems of "Faith, Hope and Charity," namely a cross, an anchor and a heart.

The city seal was briefly the object of a controversy in 2013, when the national group Americans United for Separation of Church and State sent the city a letter in which they argued that the seal unconstitutionally promotes Christianity, thus allegedly breaching the First Amendment Establishment Clause. The controversy faded after the city refused to change the seal.

During the 1920s Florida Land Boom, examples of stucco Mediterranean Revival architecture by native architect Medwin Peek and others were constructed in DeLand. Many of these buildings have been handsomely restored, including the restored Athens Theatre.

Since 1992, the city has hosted the DeLand Fall Festival of the Arts, a two-day event held annually in the historic downtown area on the weekend before Thanksgiving. As of 2009, the event has an annual attendance of more than 50,000 during the weekend.

== Geography ==
=== Topography ===
According to the United States Census Bureau, the city has a total area of 17.8 square miles (46.1 km^{2}), of which 0.19 sq mi (0.5 km^{2}), or 1.06%, is covered by water. DeLand is drained by the St. Johns River.

=== Climate ===
The climate in this area is characterized by hot, humid summers and generally mild winters. According to the Köppen climate classification, the City of DeLand has a humid subtropical climate zone (Cfa).

Climate data for DeLand, Florida, 1991–2020 normals, extremes 1892–present
Month	Jan	Feb	Mar	Apr	May	Jun	Jul	Aug	Sep	Oct	Nov	Dec	Year
Record high °F (°C)	89 (32)	90 (32)	96 (36)	98 (37)	100 (38)	102 (39)	102 (39)	102 (39)	101 (38)	98 (37)	91 (33)	89 (32)	102 (39)
Mean maximum °F (°C)	81.8 (27.7)	83.9 (28.8)	87.4 (30.8)	90.3 (32.4)	93.8 (34.3)	96.0 (35.6)	96.7 (35.9)	96.3 (35.7)	93.9 (34.4)	91.1 (32.8)	86.1 (30.1)	82.6 (28.1)	97.5 (36.4)
Mean daily maximum °F (°C)	69.1 (20.6)	72.1 (22.3)	76.4 (24.7)	81.2 (27.3)	85.9 (29.9)	89.2 (31.8)	90.9 (32.7)	90.4 (32.4)	87.7 (30.9)	82.5 (28.1)	75.8 (24.3)	71.2 (21.8)	81.0 (27.2)
Daily mean °F (°C)	56.9 (13.8)	59.7 (15.4)	63.6 (17.6)	69.1 (20.6)	74.7 (23.7)	79.8 (26.6)	81.6 (27.6)	81.5 (27.5)	79.3 (26.3)	73.0 (22.8)	65.0 (18.3)	59.8 (15.4)	70.3 (21.3)
Mean daily minimum °F (°C)	44.6 (7.0)	47.4 (8.6)	50.7 (10.4)	57.1 (13.9)	63.6 (17.6)	70.5 (21.4)	72.2 (22.3)	72.7 (22.6)	70.8 (21.6)	63.5 (17.5)	54.2 (12.3)	48.4 (9.1)	59.6 (15.3)
Mean minimum °F (°C)	29.1 (−1.6)	31.6 (−0.2)	35.9 (2.2)	43.6 (6.4)	53.9 (12.2)	65.0 (18.3)	68.1 (20.1)	69.0 (20.6)	64.7 (18.2)	50.3 (10.2)	40.2 (4.6)	33.4 (0.8)	27.4 (−2.6)
Record low °F (°C)	16 (−9)	15 (−9)	25 (−4)	30 (−1)	42 (6)	54 (12)	59 (15)	60 (16)	53 (12)	34 (1)	24 (−4)	16 (−9)	15 (−9)
Average precipitation inches (mm)	3.07 (78)	2.44 (62)	3.54 (90)	2.47 (63)	4.16 (106)	8.20 (208)	8.70 (221)	7.05 (179)	6.91 (176)	3.98 (101)	2.32 (59)	2.65 (67)	55.49 (1,409)
Average precipitation days (≥ 0.01 in)	8.3	7.4	7.9	6.2	8.6	17.2	17.2	16.5	14.0	10.3	8.1	8.2	129.9
Source: NOAA

On February 2, 2007, DeLand and the surrounding area was the site of a major tornado outbreak. One tornado passed through Deland. It reached a peak intensity of EF-3 (160–165 mph; 257–266 km/h), had a track length of 26 miles (42 km), and was responsible for the deaths of 13 people. On August 18, 2020, an EF-2 tornado made landfall in DeLand around 4 PM EST, and caused an estimated $7.4 million in damages over its 4.6-mile (7.4 km) path.

== Demographics ==
Historical population
Census	Pop.	Note	%±
1890	1,113		—
1900	1,449		30.2%
1910	2,812		94.1%
1920	3,324		18.2%
1930	5,246		57.8%
1940	7,041		34.2%
1950	8,652		22.9%
1960	10,775		24.5%
1970	11,641		8.0%
1980	15,354		31.9%
1990	16,491		7.4%
2000	20,904		26.8%
2010	27,031		29.3%
2020	37,351		38.2%
2025 (est.)	46,346		24.1%
U.S. Decennial Census

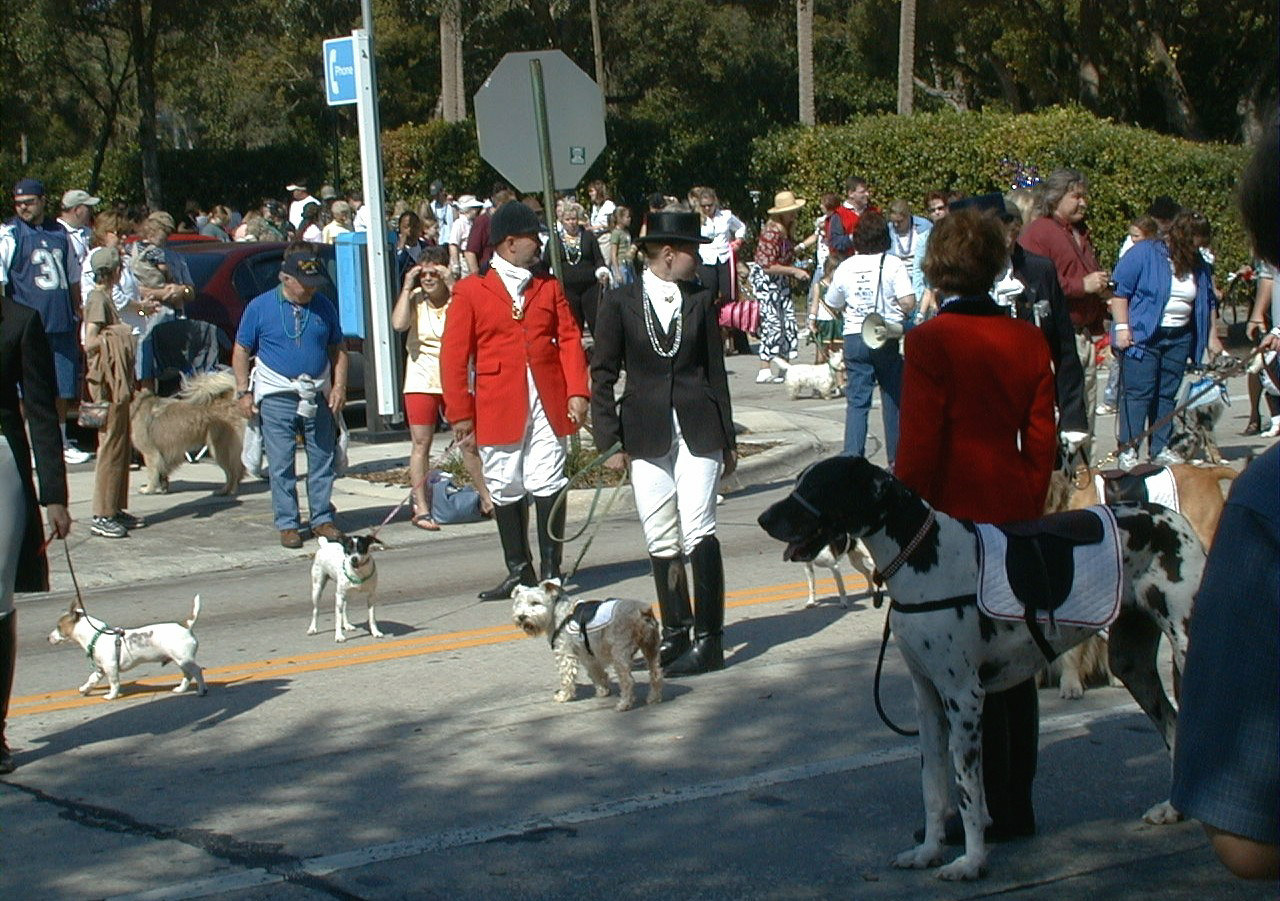
Annual Dog Parade

=== Racial and ethnic composition ===
DeLand racial composition (Hispanics excluded from racial categories) (NH = Non-Hispanic)
Race	Pop 2010	Pop 2020	% 2010	% 2020
White (NH)	18,122	22,760	67.04%	60.94%
Black or African American (NH)	4,465	5,056	16.52%	13.54%
Native American or Alaska Native (NH)	56	52	0.21%	0.14%
Asian (NH)	484	901	1.79%	2.41%
Pacific Islander or Native Hawaiian (NH)	14	19	0.05%	0.05%
Some other race (NH)	32	254	0.12%	0.68%
Two or more races/multiracial (NH)	436	1,297	1.61%	3.47%
Hispanic or Latino (any race)	3,422	7,012	12.66%	18.77%
Total	27,031	37,351	100.00%	100.00%

=== 2020 census ===
As of the 2020 census, DeLand had a population of 37,351. The median age was 42.3 years. 19.0% of residents were under the age of 18 and 25.1% of residents were 65 years of age or older. For every 100 females there were 83.5 males, and for every 100 females age 18 and over there were 79.9 males age 18 and over.

99.9% of residents lived in urban areas, while 0.1% lived in rural areas.

There were 14,556 households in DeLand, of which 26.3% had children under the age of 18 living in them. Of all households, 43.2% were married-couple households, 15.6% were households with a male householder and no spouse or partner present, and 34.3% were households with a female householder and no spouse or partner present. About 31.6% of all households were made up of individuals and 17.8% had someone living alone who was 65 years of age or older. There were 7,753 families residing in the city.

There were 16,124 housing units, of which 9.7% were vacant. The homeowner vacancy rate was 3.0% and the rental vacancy rate was 7.9%.

=== 2010 census ===
As of the 2010 United States census, 27,031 people, 10,007 households, and 5,498 families were living in the city.

=== 2000 census ===
As of 2000, the city had 8,375 households, of which 23.8% had children under 18 living with them, 37.0% were married couples living together, 14.6% had a female householder with no husband present, and 44.7% were not families. About 37.2% of all households were made up of individuals, and 20.4% had someone living alone who was 65 or older. The average household size was 2.22 and the average family size was 2.92.

In 2000, in the city, the age distribution was 20.7% under 18, 14.9% from 18 to 24, 23.2% from 25 to 44, 17.6% from 45 to 64, and 23.6% who were 65 or older. The median age was 38 years. For every 100 females, there were 83.0 males. For every 100 females 18 and over, there were 77.8 males.

In 2000, the median income for a household in the city was $28,712, and for a family was $35,329. Males had a median income of $26,389 versus $20,114 for females. The per capita income for the city was $15,936. About 14.2% of families and 19.0% of the population were below the poverty line, including 31.3% of those under 18 and 8.7% of those 65 or over.

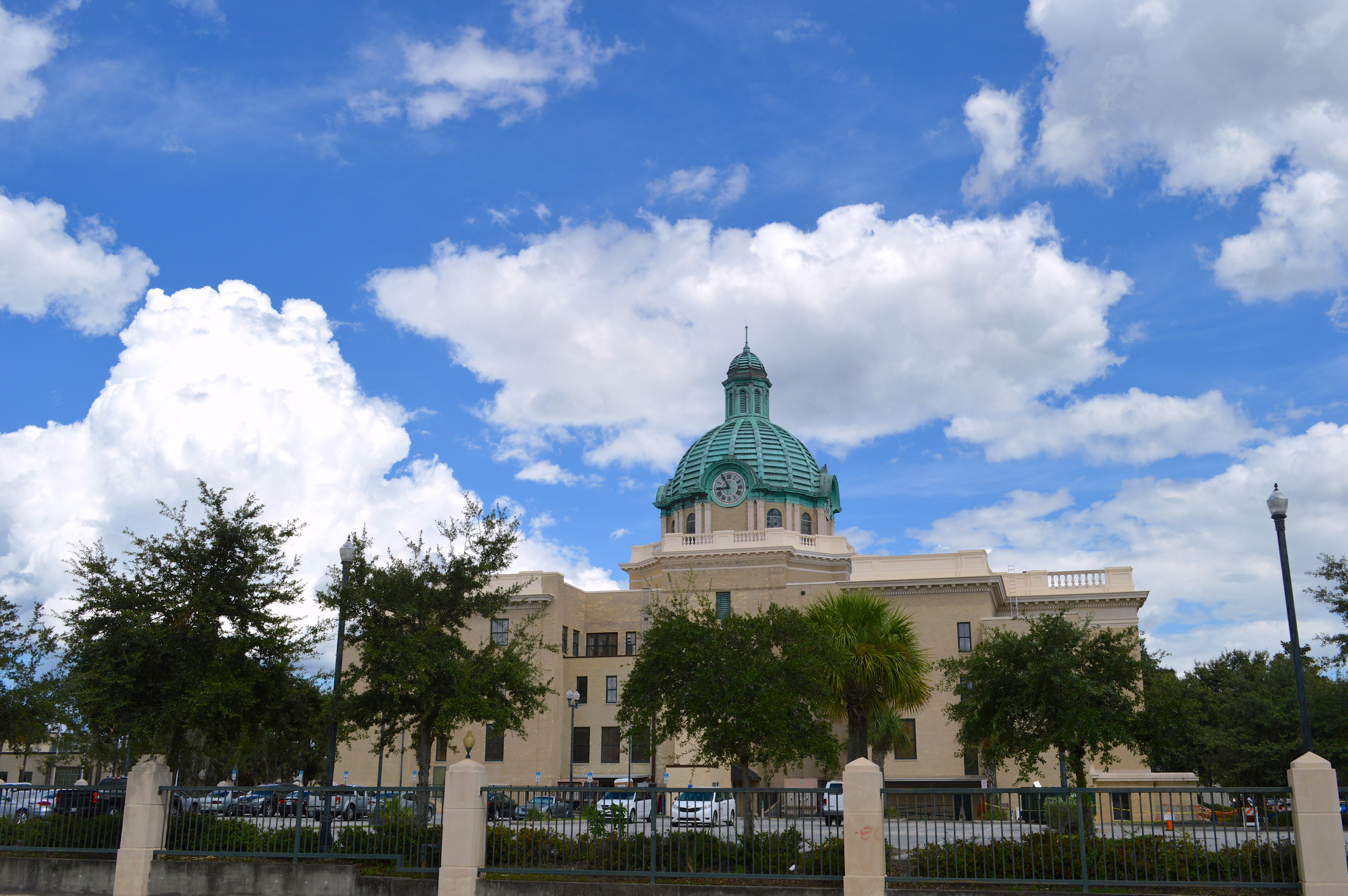
Old Volusia County Courthouse DeLand

== Arts and culture ==
Sites of interest include:

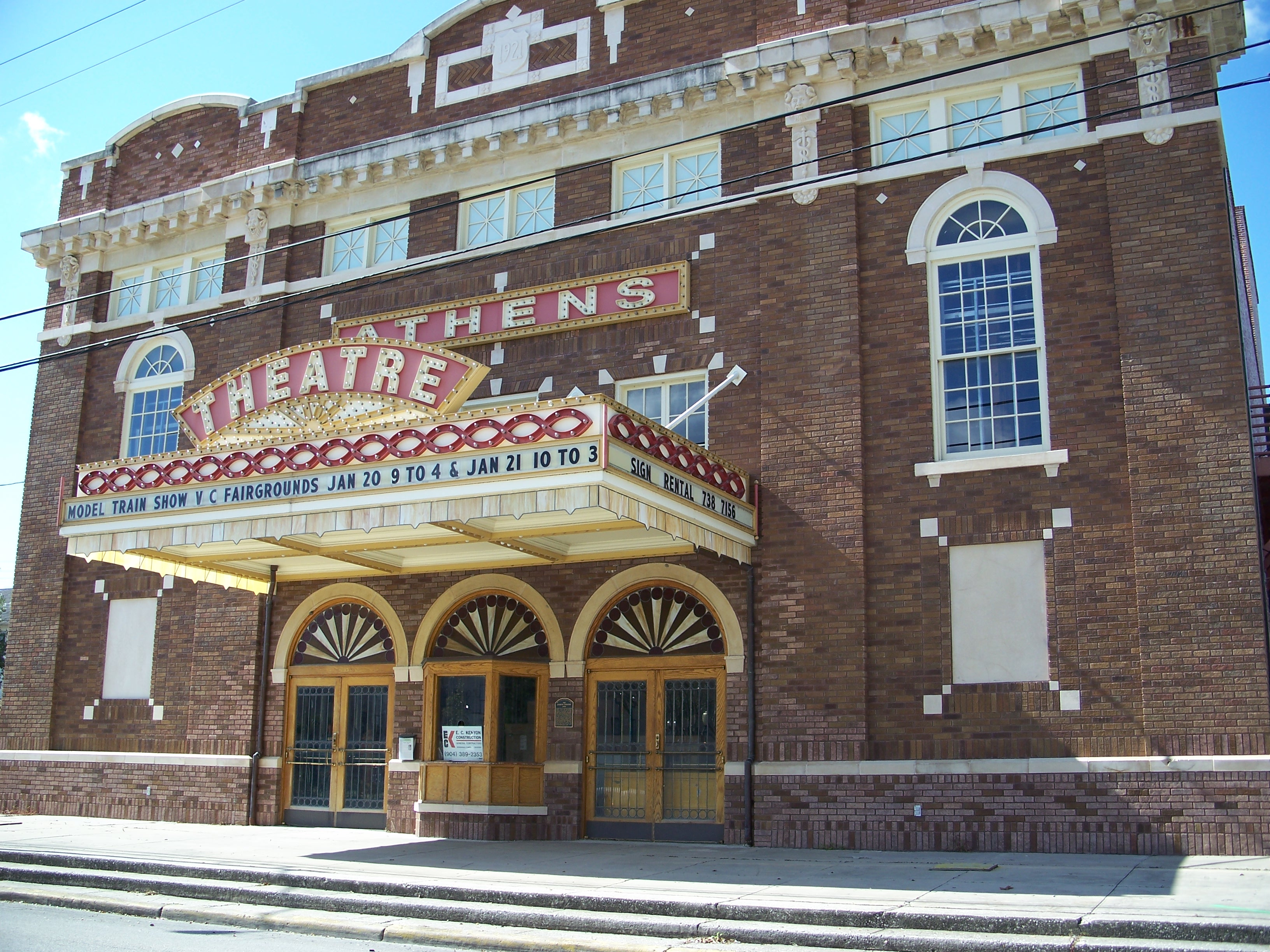
Athens Theatre, built in 1921

- African American Museum of Art
- Alexander Haynes House
- Athens Theatre
- Chief Master at Arms House
- DeLand Hall
- DeLand Municipal Airport
- DeLand Station
- Downtown DeLand Historic District
- John B. Stetson House
- Kilkoff House
- Museum of Art - DeLand
- Old DeLand Memorial Hospital
- Stetson University Campus Historic District
- Stockton-Lindquist House
- Volusia County Fair and Expo Center
- Volusia Speedway Park
- West Volusia Historical Society & Museum

=== Historic districts ===
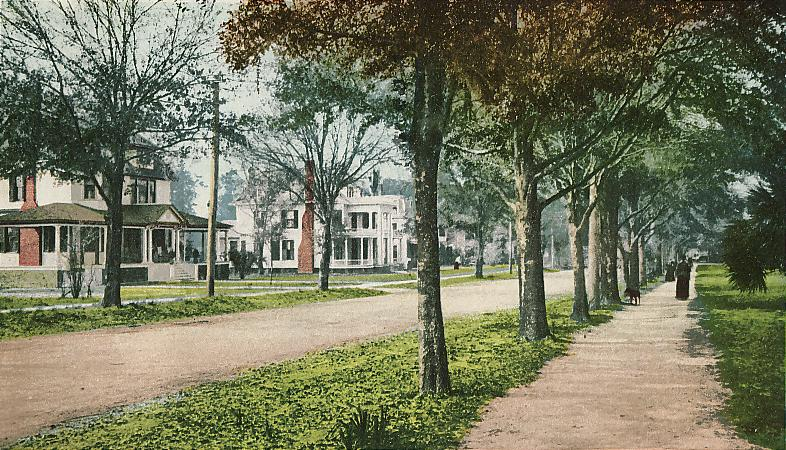
New York Avenue in 1905

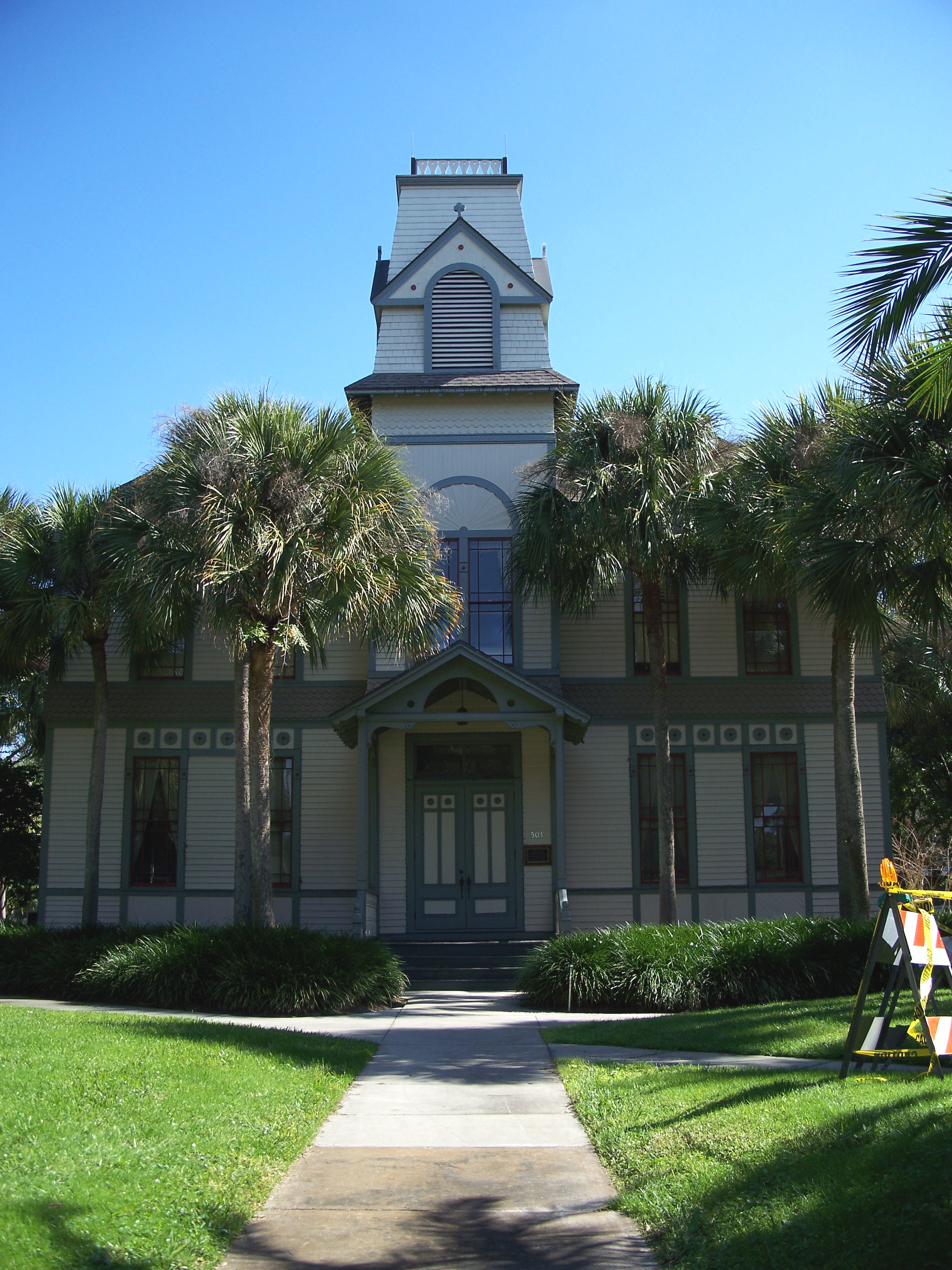
DeLand Hall, built in 1884

Downtown DeLand's main street, Woodland Boulevard, has a number of notable 19th-century buildings. It is officially known as Downtown DeLand Historic District.

The Garden District is a mixed-use neighborhood adjacent to downtown DeLand, which is officially known as Downtown DeLand's Historic Garden District. The neighborhood was originally developed between 1900 and 1920. It fell into a long period of decline after World War II, and by the 1980s, had become blighted.

In 2001, an artist bought 27 dilapidated structures, renamed the area the Garden District, and lobbied to create a new historic district. During the following eight years, he restored 32 homes and businesses, which have become the core of a neighborhood revival. This was documented in the film New Urban Cowboy: Toward a New Pedestrianism.

== Sports ==
DeLand hosts all home games for Stetson University Stetson Hatters athletic teams. The Stetson Hatters men's basketball team and women's basketball teams play at the Edmunds Center, an on-campus arena which opened in 1974 and seats about 5,000 spectators.

The Hatters baseball team plays at Melching Field at Conrad Park, a 2,500-seat ballpark. Melching Field was built in 1999 and is a college baseball venues in the NCAA, having hosted numerous Atlantic Sun Conference championships, and the 2018 NCAA Baseball Regionals. Prior to the opening of Melching Field, the Hatters played at old Conrad Park on the same site, which also hosted spring training games in the 1940s and 1950s and the DeLand Red Hats, a Florida State League minor league franchise.

Spec Martin Stadium is a 6,000-seat football stadium that serves as home of the Stetson University Hatters football team. Stetson had discontinued its football program in the early 1960s, and reinstated the sport in 2013, when it joined the Pioneer Football League.

DeLand has been called the "skydiving capital of the world", with the several skydiving industries located here. The skydiving industry employs over 500 workers from the DeLand area. This in combination with the tourist end of the industry makes it one of the town's largest economic contributors.

The Central Florida Warriors of the USA Rugby League are based in DeLand.

== Government ==
The City of DeLand has a commission-manager form of government. The city commission consists of five members, one of whom is the independently elected Mayor-Commissioner. All commissioners are elected citywide in non-partisan elections every four years. The mayor is Chris Cloudman.

== Education ==
Public primary and secondary education is handled by Volusia County Schools.

=== Elementary schools ===
- Blue Lake Elementary
- Citrus Grove Elementary
- Edith I. Starke Elementary
- Freedom Elementary
- George W. Marks Elementary
- Woodward Avenue Elementary

=== Middle schools ===
- DeLand Middle School
- Southwestern Middle School

=== High schools ===
- DeLand High School

=== Private schools ===
- DeLand Preparatory Academy
- Magnolia Christian School
- Saint Barnabas Episcopal School
- Saint Peters Catholic School
- Stetson Baptist Christian School

=== Montessori schools ===
- Casa Montessori School
- Children's House Montessori School

=== Colleges and universities ===
- Daytona State College
- Florida Technical College
- Stetson University

== Infrastructure ==
=== Transportation ===
==== Rail and public transportation ====
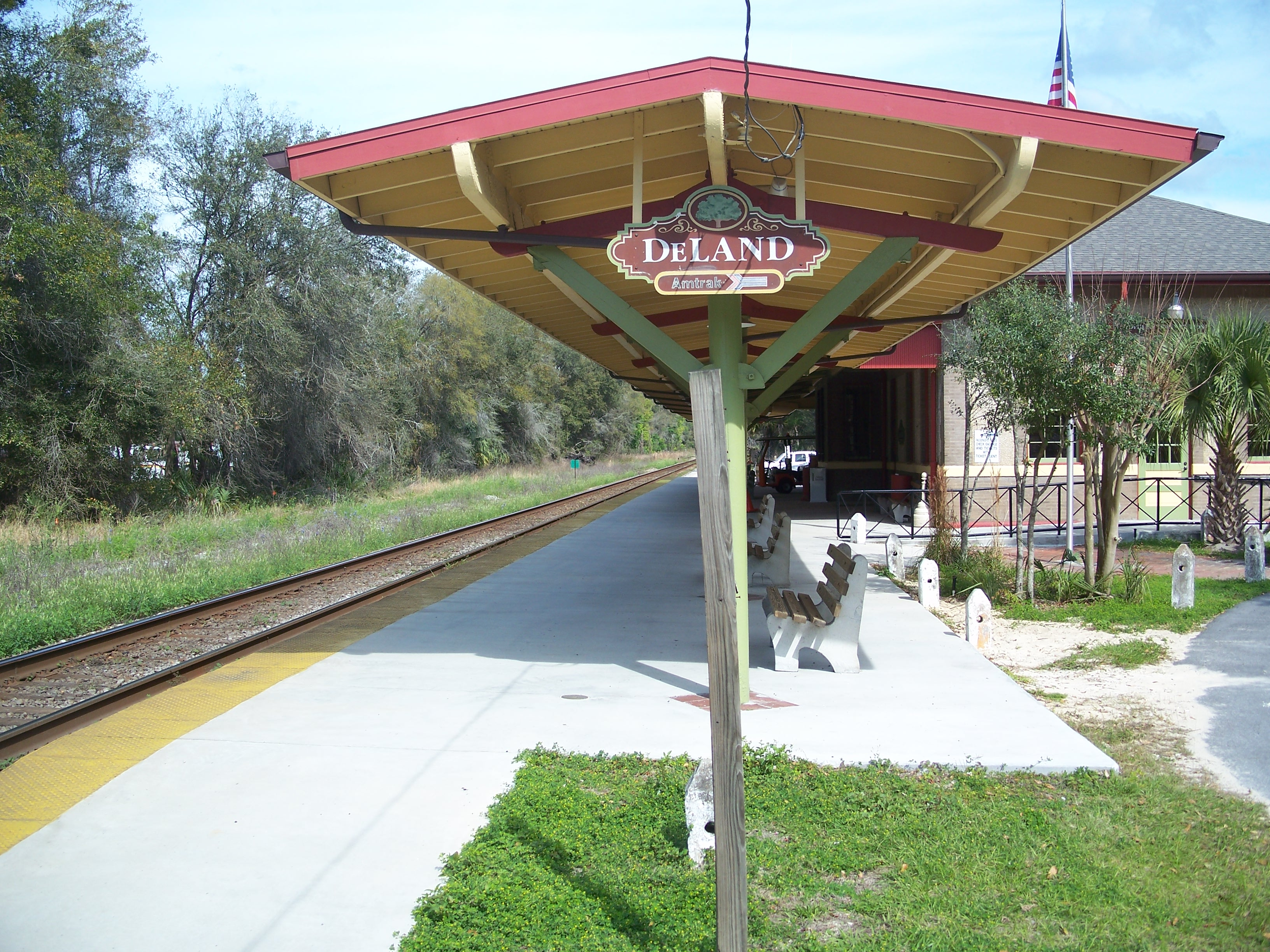
DeLand Station

Since 2024, the DeLand station has been the northern terminus of Orlando's SunRail commuter rail system. It also contains a spur leading from the station which was built by the Orange Ridge, DeLand and Atlantic Railroad and has received passenger service in the past.

Local transit service is provided by VOTRAN.

==== Aviation ====
During World War II, Babcock Airplane Corporation manufactured 60 Waco CG-4 assault gliders at DeLand. The firm was out of business by 1945.

The DeLand Municipal Airport operates as a general aviation airport as well as a reliever airport for Orlando and Daytona Beach. It also contains the DeLand Naval Air Station Museum.

==== Highways ====
- U.S. Route 17 in Florida
- U.S. Route 92
- Florida State Road 44
- Florida State Road 15A

== Notable people ==
- Horace Allen, professional MLB baseball player
- Byllye Avery, health care activist
- Charles P. Bailey, former U.S. Army Air Force officer and Tuskegee Airman
- R. H. Barlow, author, poet, anthropologist, and historian
- Bill Booth, skydiving engineer, inventor, and entrepreneur
- David Cohen, CEO and founder of TechStars
- Joyce Cusack, former member of the Florida House of Representatives and retired registered nurse
- Terence Trent D'Arby, singer-songwriter
- Jacob deGrom, current MLB baseball player
- Paul Dicken, former MLB baseball player
- Marvin Dunn (born 1940) educator, historian, and filmmaker; born and raised in DeLand
- Daniel Dye, professional stock car racing driver
- Bert Fish, lawyer, judge, philanthropist, and ambassador.
- R. Buckminster Fuller, mathematician, futurist, inventor of the geodesic dome, and coined the phrase "Spaceship Earth"
- Mike Gillislee, former NFL football player
- Lue Gim Gong, horticulturalist
- Bridgette Gordon, head women's basketball coach at Florida A&M University, and former WNBA basketball player
- Stephen Guarino, actor and comedian
- Ed Hickox, retired MLB umpire
- Carolyn J. B. Howard, politician who previously served the Maryland House of Delegates
- Burling Hull, magician
- Craig James, lawyer and former congressman
- Arthur Jones, inventor and founder of Nautilus, Inc. and MedX Corporation
- Chipper Jones, MLB Hall of Fame baseball player
- Danny Kelley, stock car racing driver
- Kitty, musician and rapper
- J. C. Van Landingham, former NASCAR driver
- Dee Libbey, composer
- Gary Russell Libby, art historian, curator, and director emeritus of Museum of Arts and Sciences
- Vincent Martella, actor
- Jack Ness, former MLB baseball player
- Medwin Peek, Mediterranean Revival architect
- Luke Scott, former baseball player
- Frances Shimer, founder of Shimer College in Illinois
- Maurice Starr, musician, songwriter, and record producer, notably for New Edition and New Kids on the Block
- John Batterson Stetson, hat manufacturer who invented the Stetson cowboy hat
- Tra Thomas, IMG Academy coach and former NFL football player
- William Amory Underhill, lobbyist and philanthropist
- Noble "Thin Man" Watts, saxophonist
- Luke Weaver, MLB baseball player
- Verner Moore White, landscape and portrait painter
- Earl Ziebarth, state representative

== Sister city ==
DeLand is a sister city of Belén, Costa Rica.

== See also ==
- Yemassee Settlement
