= Old DeLand Memorial Hospital =

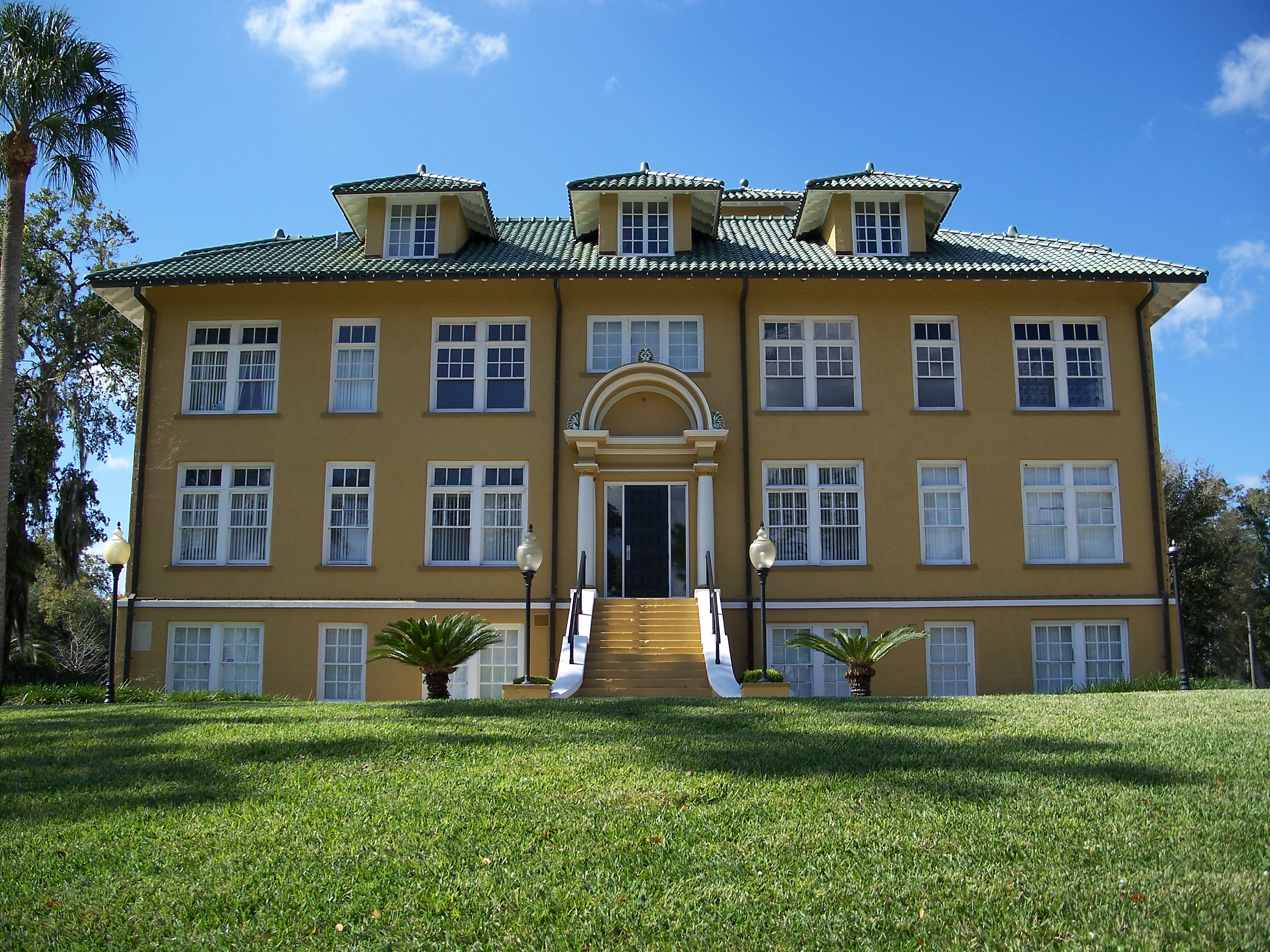

Geography
- Location: Florida, United States

History
- Opened: 1922

Links
- Lists: Hospitals in Florida
- Old DeLand Memorial Hospital
- U.S. National Register of Historic Places
- Location within Volusia County
- Location: DeLand, Florida United States
- Coordinates: 29°2′37″N 81°19′3″W
- Built: 1920, 1926
- Architect: J.T. Cairns, F.M. Miller (1920); Gouveneur M. Peek (1926 addition)
- Architectural style: Italian Renaissance and Masonry Vernacular
- NRHP reference No.: 89002030
- Added to NRHP: November 27, 1989

The Old DeLand Memorial Hospital is a historic hospital in DeLand, Florida, United States. It is located at 240 North Stone Street. On November 27, 1989; it was added to the U.S. National Register of Historic Places.

== History ==
It was built between 1920 and 1926. On November 27, 1989; it was added to the U.S. National Register of Historic Places. It currently contains a local historical museum known as the DeLand Memorial Hospital & Military Museum, with exhibits including a 1920s operating room & apothecary exhibit, a gallery of military memorabilia, and tools, equipment and appliances from the early days of the area's ice and electric business. An adjacent building features the Elephant Fantasyland, which is a personal collection of elephant-themed collectibles, a toy collection, and the West Volusia Black Heritage Gallery.
