= Stetson University Campus Historic District =

Historic district in Florida, United States

- U.S. National Register of Historic Places
- U.S. Historic district
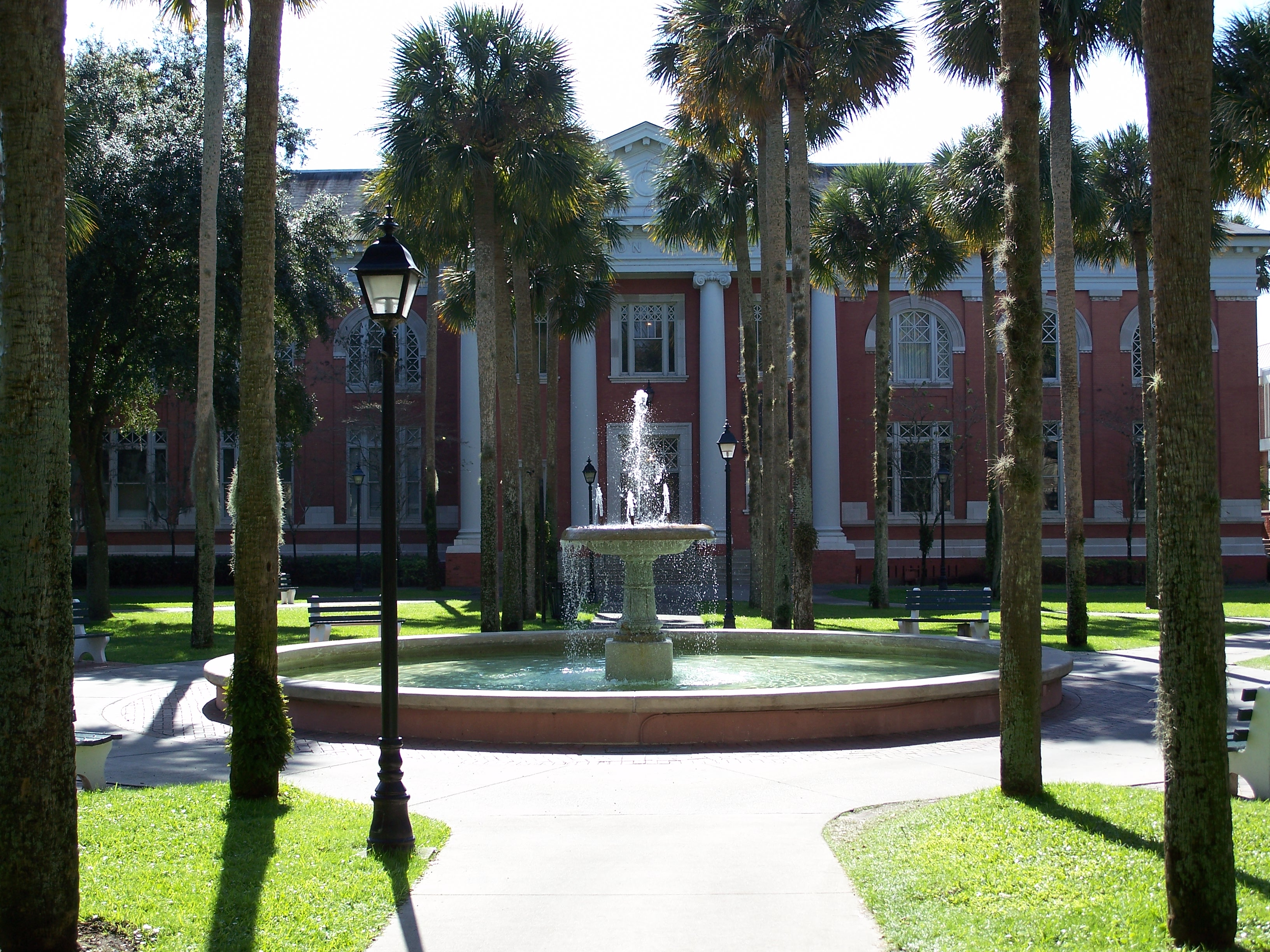
- Sampson Hall, in the district

- Location within Volusia County
- Location: DeLand, Florida United States
- Coordinates: 29°2′6″N 81°18′13″W
- Area: 220 acres (0.89 km^{2})
- Built: 1884-1934
- Architectural style: Second Empire, Colonial and Mediterranean Revival, Other
- NRHP reference No.: 91000244
- Added to NRHP: March 14, 1991

The Stetson University Campus Historic District in DeLand, Florida was listed on the National Register of Historic Places on March 14, 1991. The district is bounded by Michigan Avenue, North Florida Avenue, West University Avenue and a line South from North Hayden Avenue. It contains 10 historic buildings and one historic structure.

Elizabeth Hall is Stetson University's signature building, a stately building of patterned brick rising three stories, with a four-story central brick pavilion topped by a snowy white cupola. In the early days the tower contained a water tank, which supplied the campus with water until city water became available. In 1915 the Eloise bell chimes replaced the water tank, but they were moved in 1934. The first major building on campus built by Stetson's early benefactor, Philadelphia hat manufacturer John B. Stetson, it is named for his wife, Elizabeth. The south wing contains a 786-seat chapel, with a magnificent German-made Beckerath 2,700-pipe manual organ surrounded by stained glass windows. The chapel is dedicated to Stetson's son Ben, who died at the age of 6. Elizabeth Hall was the first campus building to be wired for electricity during construction. Total construction cost for the 1892 central portion and two 1897 wings was $125,000 - more than the combined cost of all other Florida higher education buildings to that date. The chapel remains Stetson's main concert hall, and is often used by lecturers as well. Those appearing on its stage have included: William Jennings Bryan, Basil Rathbone, Robert Frost, Jimmy Carter, Andres Segovia, Ralph Nader, Desmond Tutu, Julian Bond, and Buckminster Fuller. Stetson's School of Music also stages about 100 concerts on its stage each year, and brings a variety of visiting musicians as well, adding greatly to the cultural offerings of the community. Elizabeth Hall was renovated in 1991 and 2001, and is in excellent condition.

== See also ==
- Stetson University
