= List of Class D airports in the United States =

Class D is a class of airspace in the United States which follows International Civil Aviation Organization (ICAO) air space designation. Class D airspace areas are designed to improve aviation safety by reducing the risk of mid-air collisions with a control tower. Aircraft operating in these airspace areas are subject to certain operating rules and equipment requirements.

This list includes civilian airports only; airfields used solely by the military are not included.

== United States ==
ICAO airport code	Airport	State	Operations
KAUO	Auburn University Regional Airport	Alabama	(Note: No operations data are available for this airport from the FAA's Operations Network (OPSNET).)
KBFM	Mobile International Airport	Alabama	46,594
KDHN	Dothan Regional Airport	Alabama	73,174
KJKA	Gulf Shores International/Jack Edwards Field Airport	Alabama	73,375
KMGM	Montgomery Regional (Dannelly Field) Airport	Alabama	65,547
KSEM	Craig Field Airport	Alabama	
KTCL	Tuscaloosa National Airport	Alabama	48,350
KTOI	Troy Municipal Airport	Alabama	(Note: Operations at military-operated towers are not reported to the FAA's Operations Network (OPSNET), so no count is available.)
PABE	Bethel Airport	Alaska	91,527
PADQ	Kodiak Airport	Alaska	22,304
PAEN	Kenai Municipal Airport	Alaska	67,727
PAFA	Fairbanks International Airport	Alaska	112,207
PAJN	Juneau International Airport	Alaska	86,667
PAKN	King Salmon Airport	Alaska	24,749
PALH	Lake Hood Seaplane Base	Alaska	89,670 (Note: Data are for 1995, the most recent full year reported; no newer full-year data are available.)
PAMR	Merrill Field Airport	Alaska	152,036
KCHD	Chandler Municipal Airport	Arizona	247,187
KDVT	Phoenix Deer Valley Airport	Arizona	490,702
KFFZ	Falcon Field Airport	Arizona	475,503
KFHU	Sierra Vista Municipal Airport	Arizona	
KFLG	Flagstaff Pulliam Airport	Arizona	44,191
KGCN	Grand Canyon National Park Airport	Arizona	58,167
KGEU	Glendale Municipal Airport	Arizona	129,322
KGYR	Phoenix Goodyear Airport	Arizona	157,277
KIFP	Laughlin/Bullhead International Airport	Arizona	15,932
KIWA	Phoenix-Mesa Gateway Airport	Arizona	304,398
KNYL	Yuma Marine Corps Air Station/Yuma International Airport	Arizona	
KPRC	Prescott Regional - Ernest A Love Field Airport	Arizona	390,134
KRYN	Ryan Field Airport	Arizona	113,234
KSDL	Scottsdale Airport	Arizona	165,089
KASG	Springdale Municipal Airport	Arkansas	40,338
KFSM	Fort Smith Regional Airport	Arkansas	28,388
KFYV	Drake Field Airport	Arkansas	26,191
KROG	Rogers Executive - Carter Field Airport	Arkansas	21,258
KTXK	Texarkana Regional-Webb Field Airport	Arkansas	18,563
KAPC	Napa County Airport	California	68,419
KBFL	Meadows Field Airport	California	103,929
KCCR	Buchanan Field Airport	California	86,582
KCIC	Chico Municipal Airport	California	30,969
KCMA	Camarillo Airport	California	186,679
KCNO	Chino Airport	California	270,420
KCRQ	McClellan–Palomar Airport	California	170,548
KEMT	San Gabriel Valley Airport	California	112,084
KFUL	Fullerton Municipal Airport	California	87,531
KHHR	Hawthorne Municipal Airport	California	51,842
KHWD	Hayward Executive Airport	California	127,388
KLGB	Long Beach (Daugherty Field) Airport	California	376,994
KLVK	Livermore Municipal Airport	California	188,275
KMER	Castle Airport	California	27,673
KMHR	Sacramento Mather Airport	California	71,698
KMHV	Mojave Air and Space Port	California	
KMOD	Modesto City–County Airport	California	44,218
KMYF	Montgomery-Gibbs Executive Airport	California	371,105
KNUQ	Moffett Federal Airfield	California	(Note: This is a government-owned airfield with restricted use and is not open to the general public.)
KOXR	Oxnard Airport	California	111,172
KPAO	Palo Alto Airport	California	149,188
KPMD	Palmdale Regional Airport	California	17,075
KPOC	Brackett Field Airport	California	134,803
KPSP	Palm Springs International Airport	California	60,586
KRAL	Riverside Municipal Airport	California	132,010
KRDD	Redding Municipal Airport	California	76,040
KRHV	Reid–Hillview Airport	California	175,054
KRNM	Ramona Airport	California	122,640
KSAC	Sacramento Executive Airport	California	61,584
KSBD	San Bernardino International Airport	California	65,109
KSBP	San Luis County Regional Airport	California	69,574
KSCK	Stockton Metro Airport	California	52,652
KSDM	Brown Field Municipal Airport	California	88,403
KSEE	Gillespie Field	California	201,303
KSMO	Santa Monica Municipal Airport	California	77,329
KSMX	Santa Maria Public Airport	California	30,076
KSNS	Salinas Municipal Airport	California	51,788
KSQL	San Carlos Airport	California	117,520
KSTS	Charles M. Schulz–Sonoma County Airport	California	79,271
KTOA	Zamperini Field	California	92,941
KTRK	Truckee-Tahoe Airport	California	
KVCV	Southern California Logistics Airport	California	11,044
KVNY	Van Nuys Airport	California	232,556
KWHP	Whiteman Airport	California	126,976
KWJF	General William J. Fox Airfield	California	70,002
KAPA	Centennial Airport	Colorado	305,102
KASE	Aspen/Pitkin County Airport	Colorado	46,744
KBJC	Rocky Mountain Metro Airport	Colorado	210,684
KCFO	Colorado Air and Space Port	Colorado	124,574
KEGE	Eagle County Regional Airport	Colorado	50,777
KGJT	Grand Junction Regional Airport	Colorado	68,032
KPUB	Pueblo Memorial Airport	Colorado	116,113
KBDR	Sikorsky Memorial Airport	Connecticut	68,728
KDXR	Danbury Municipal Airport	Connecticut	59,795
KGON	Groton-New London Airport	Connecticut	43,586
KHFD	Hartford-Brainard Airport	Connecticut	71,882
KHVN	Tweed New Haven Airport	Connecticut	34,454
KJSD	Sikorsky Memorial Airport	Connecticut	(Note: This is a private-use airport and is not open to the public.)
KOXC	Waterbury-Oxford Airport	Connecticut	49,850
KDOV	Dover Air Force Base	Delaware	
KILG	New Castle Airport	Delaware	45,856
06FA	William P. Gwinn Airport	Florida	(Note: This airport has no ICAO code assigned; the FAA location identifier is shown.)
KAPF	Naples Municipal Airport	Florida	123,355
KBCT	Boca Raton Airport	Florida	84,208
KBKV	Brooksville-Tampa Bay Regional Airport	Florida	104,060
KBOW	Bartow Executive Airport	Florida	
KCRG	Jacksonville Executive at Craig Airport	Florida	172,642
KDTS	Destin Executive Airport	Florida	71,637
KECP	Northwest Florida Beaches International Airport	Florida	93,493
KEVB	New Smyrna Beach Municipal Airport	Florida	171,603
KEYW	Key West International Airport	Florida	61,514
KFIN	Flagler Executive Airport	Florida	183,486
KFMY	Page Field	Florida	160,705
KFPR	Treasure Coast International Airport	Florida	177,991
KFXE	Fort Lauderdale Executive Airport	Florida	199,389
KGNV	Gainesville Regional Airport	Florida	74,676
KHWO	North Perry Airport	Florida	311,360
KISM	Kissimmee Gateway Airport	Florida	130,627
KLAL	Lakeland Linder International Airport	Florida	158,830
KLCQ	Lake City Gateway Airport	Florida	
KLEE	Leesburg International Airport	Florida	119,305
KMLB	Melbourne Orlando International Airport	Florida	156,865
KOCF	Ocala International Airport	Florida	92,647
KOMN	Ormond Beach Municipal Airport	Florida	155,081
KOPF	Miami-Opa Locka Executive Airport	Florida	155,392
KORL	Orlando Executive Airport	Florida	176,185
KPGD	Punta Gorda Airport	Florida	132,847
KPIE	St. Pete–Clearwater International Airport	Florida	162,712
KPMP	Pompano Beach Airpark	Florida	113,456
KSGJ	Northeast Florida Regional Airport	Florida	154,374
KSPG	Albert Whitted Airport	Florida	102,749
KSUA	Witham Field	Florida	113,632
KTIX	Space Coast Regional Airport	Florida	117,603
KTMB	Miami Executive Airport	Florida	317,128
KTTS	Shuttle Landing Facility	Florida	
KVPS	Destin–Fort Walton Beach Airport	Florida	
KVQQ	Cecil Airport	Florida	132,674
KVRB	Vero Beach Regional Airport	Florida	338,508
KABY	Southwest Georgia Regional Airport	Georgia	13,530
KAGS	Augusta Regional Airport	Georgia	42,736
KAHN	Athens–Ben Epps Airport	Georgia	41,495
KCSG	Columbus Airport	Georgia	34,606
KEZM	Heart of Georgia Regional Airport	Georgia	
KFTY	Fulton County Airport (Georgia)	Georgia	74,210
KLHW	MidCoast Regional Airport at Wright Army Airfield	Georgia	
KLZU	Gwinnett County/Briscoe Field Airport	Georgia	122,444
KMCN	Middle Georgia Regional Airport	Georgia	24,340
KPDK	Dekalb-Peachtree Airport	Georgia	169,311
KRYY	Cobb County International Airport	Georgia	110,461
KVLD	Valdosta Regional Airport	Georgia	24,297 (Note: Data are for 2008, the most recent full year reported; no newer full-year data are available.)
PGUM	Guam International Airport	Guam	51,845
PHJR	Kalaeloa Airport	Hawaii	217,810
PHKO	Kona International Airport	Hawaii	97,642
PHLI	Lihue Airport	Hawaii	126,932
PHMK	Molokai Airport	Hawaii	32,224
PHTO	Hilo International Airport	Hawaii	36,194
KIDA	Idaho Falls Regional Airport	Idaho	30,566
KLWS	Lewiston–Nez Perce County Airport	Idaho	31,906
KPIH	Pocatello Regional Airport	Idaho	32,492
KSUN	Friedman Memorial Airport	Idaho	25,500
KTWF	Magic Valley Regional Airport	Idaho	22,764
KALN	St. Louis Regional Airport	Illinois	41,651
KARR	Aurora Municipal Airport	Illinois	86,858
KBLV	MidAmerica St. Louis Airport	Illinois	
KBMI	Central Illinois Regional Airport	Illinois	21,997
KCPS	St. Louis Downtown Airport	Illinois	111,130
KDEC	Decatur Airport	Illinois	23,393
KDPA	Dupage Airport	Illinois	154,375
KLOT	Lewis University Airport	Illinois	102,287
KMDH	Southern Illinois Airport	Illinois	106,585
KMWA	Veterans Airport of Southern Illinois	Illinois	21,186
KPWK	Chicago Executive Airport	Illinois	100,958
KRFD	Chicago/Rockford International Airport	Illinois	46,603
KUGN	Waukegan National Airport	Illinois	48,129
KAID	Anderson Municipal Airport	Indiana	
KBAK	Columbus Municipal Airport	Indiana	57,463
KBMG	Monroe County Airport	Indiana	26,404
KEKM	Elkhart Municipal Airport	Indiana	
KGUS	Grissom Air Reserve Base	Indiana	
KGYY	Gary/Chicago International Airport	Indiana	24,263
KHUF	Terre Haute Regional Airport	Indiana	61,848
KLAF	Purdue University Airport	Indiana	120,251
KMIE	Delaware County Regional Airport	Indiana	22,921
KALO	Waterloo Regional Airport	Iowa	22,256
KDBQ	Dubuque Regional Airport	Iowa	71,627
KSUX	Sioux Gateway Airport	Iowa	23,979
KBEC	Beech Factory Airport	Kansas	
KFOE	Topeka Regional Airport	Kansas	17,939
KGCK	Garden City Regional Airport	Kansas	14,620
KHUT	Hutchinson Municipal Airport (Kansas)	Kansas	29,925
KIXD	New Century Aircenter	Kansas	69,619
KMHK	Manhattan Regional Airport	Kansas	31,052
KOJC	Johnson County Executive Airport	Kansas	52,635
KSLN	Salina Regional Airport	Kansas	67,468
KTOP	Philip Billard Municipal Airport	Kansas	20,458
KLOU	Bowman Field (Kentucky)	Kentucky	139,659
KOWB	Owensboro–Daviess County Regional Airport	Kentucky	19,315
KPAH	Barkley Regional Airport	Kentucky	14,763
KAEX	Alexandria International Airport	Louisiana	33,704 (Note: Data are for 2024, the most recent full year reported; no newer full-year data are available.)
KARA	Acadiana Regional Airport	Louisiana	43,850
KCWF	Chennault International Airport	Louisiana	34,218
KDTN	Shreveport Downtown Airport	Louisiana	47,884
KHDC	Hammond Northshore Regional Airport	Louisiana	38,780 (Note: Ten months only; May and June 2025 were not reported.)
KHUM	Houma-Terrebonne Airport	Louisiana	89,807
KLCH	Lake Charles Regional Airport	Louisiana	26,732
KMLU	Monroe Regional Airport	Louisiana	35,129
KNEW	Lakefront Airport	Louisiana	79,325
KESN	Easton Airport (Maryland)	Maryland	52,552
KFDK	Frederick Municipal Airport	Maryland	89,818
KHGR	Hagerstown Regional Airport	Maryland	31,834
KMTN	Martin State Airport	Maryland	78,040
KSBY	Salisbury-Ocean City Wicomico Regional Airport	Maryland	88,422
KACK	Nantucket Memorial Airport	Massachusetts	61,448
KBAF	Westfield-Barnes Regional Airport	Massachusetts	50,679
KBED	Hanscom Field	Massachusetts	116,430
KBVY	Beverly Regional Airport	Massachusetts	66,861
KCEF	Westover Metropolitan Airport	Massachusetts	
KEWB	New Bedford Regional Airport	Massachusetts	66,174
KHYA	Cape Cod Gateway Airport	Massachusetts	60,788
KLWM	Lawrence Municipal Airport	Massachusetts	80,640
KMVY	Martha's Vineyard Airport	Massachusetts	41,941
KORH	Worcester Regional Airport	Massachusetts	30,310
KOWD	Norwood Memorial Airport	Massachusetts	74,547
KAPN	Alpena County Regional Airport	Michigan	
KARB	Ann Arbor Municipal Airport	Michigan	64,612
KAZO	Kalamazoo/Battle Creek International Airport	Michigan	51,831
KBTL	W. K. Kellogg Airport	Michigan	87,605
KDET	Coleman A Young Municipal Airport	Michigan	43,891
KGOV	Grayling Army Airfield	Michigan	
KJXN	Jackson County Airport (Michigan)	Michigan	40,828
KMBS	MBS International Airport	Michigan	18,351
KMKG	Muskegon County Airport	Michigan	28,788
KPTK	Oakland County International Airport	Michigan	149,185
KSAW	Sawyer International Airport	Michigan	16,252
KTVC	Cherry Capital Airport	Michigan	86,926
KYIP	Willow Run Airport	Michigan	81,153
KANE	Anoka County–Blaine Airport	Minnesota	65,288
KDLH	Duluth International Airport	Minnesota	83,622
KFCM	Flying Cloud Airport	Minnesota	150,645
KMIC	Crystal Airport (Minnesota)	Minnesota	46,087
KRST	Rochester International Airport	Minnesota	50,410
KSTC	St Cloud Regional Airport	Minnesota	36,126
KSTP	St. Paul Downtown Airport	Minnesota	40,618
KGLH	Greenville Mid-Delta Airport	Mississippi	20,473
KGPT	Gulfport-Biloxi International Airport	Mississippi	64,523
KGTR	Golden Triangle Regional Airport	Mississippi	38,109
KGWO	Greenwood-Leflore Airport	Mississippi	
KHKS	Hawkins Field Airport	Mississippi	20,594
KHSA	Stennis International Airport	Mississippi	40,568
KMEI	Key Field Airport	Mississippi	51,266
KOLV	Olive Branch Airport	Mississippi	105,904
KPQL	Trent Lott International Airport	Mississippi	(Note: No 2025 data are available; the first month reported is February 2026.)
KTUP	Tupelo Regional Airport	Mississippi	54,511
KBBG	Branson Airport	Missouri	10,425
KCGI	Cape Girardeau Regional Airport	Missouri	19,858
KCOU	Columbia Regional Airport	Missouri	27,500
KJEF	Jefferson City Memorial Airport	Missouri	41,070
KJLN	Joplin Regional Airport	Missouri	17,971
KMKC	Charles B. Wheeler Downtown Airport	Missouri	81,099
KSTJ	Rosecrans Memorial Airport	Missouri	26,336
KSUS	Spirit of St. Louis Airport	Missouri	141,449
KTBN	Waynesville-St. Robert Regional Airport	Missouri	
KBZN	Bozeman Yellowstone International Airport	Montana	114,239
KGPI	Glacier Park International Airport	Montana	50,852
KGTF	Great Falls International Airport	Montana	32,943
KHLN	Helena Regional Airport	Montana	44,864
KMSO	Missoula Montana Airport	Montana	44,725
KGRI	Central Nebraska Regional Airport	Nebraska	11,450
KHND	Henderson Executive Airport	Nevada	68,997
KVGT	North Las Vegas Airport	Nevada	223,604
KASH	Nashua Airport	New Hampshire	55,073
KLEB	Lebanon Municipal Airport (New Hampshire)	New Hampshire	29,172
KPSM	Portsmouth International Airport at Pease	New Hampshire	
KCDW	Essex County Airport	New Jersey	144,590
KMMU	Morristown Municipal Airport	New Jersey	122,458
KTEB	Teterboro Airport	New Jersey	175,217
KTTN	Trenton Mercer Airport	New Jersey	79,762
KAEG	Double Eagle II Airport	New Mexico	53,812
KFMN	Four Corners Regional Airport	New Mexico	51,214
KHOB	Lea County Regional Airport	New Mexico	11,023
KROW	Roswell International Air Center	New Mexico	26,562
KSAF	Santa Fe Municipal Airport	New Mexico	39,068
KBGM	Greater Binghamton Airport	New York	11,648
KELM	Elmira/Corning Regional Airport	New York	14,356
KFOK	Francis S. Gabreski Airport	New York	44,815
KFRG	Republic Airport	New York	230,811
KHPN	Westchester County Airport	New York	166,976
KIAG	Niagara Falls International Airport	New York	20,689
KITH	Ithaca Tompkins International Airport	New York	25,034
KJPX	East Hampton Airport	New York	
KPOU	Hudson Valley Regional Airport	New York	74,437
KRME	Griffiss International Airport	New York	29,161
KSCH	Schenectady County Airport	New York	
KSWF	New York Stewart International Airport	New York	33,766
KECG	Elizabeth City Regional Airport	North Carolina	
KEWN	Coastal Carolina Regional Airport	North Carolina	32,461
KHKY	Hickory Regional Airport	North Carolina	28,959
KILM	Wilmington International Airport	North Carolina	93,206
KINT	Smith Reynolds Airport	North Carolina	37,153
KISO	Kinston Regional Jetport	North Carolina	29,847
KJQF	Concord-Padgett Regional Airport	North Carolina	72,282
KOAJ	Albert J Ellis Airport	North Carolina	21,202
KVUJ	Stanly County Airport	North Carolina	
KBIS	Bismarck Municipal Airport	North Dakota	29,254
KFAR	Hector International Airport	North Dakota	80,370
KGFK	Grand Forks International Airport	North Dakota	320,578
KMOT	Minot International Airport	North Dakota	29,621
PGSN	Saipan International Airport	Northern Mariana Islands	34,402
KBKL	Burke Lakefront Airport	Ohio	39,641
KCGF	Cuyahoga County Airport	Ohio	28,710
KILN	Wilmington Air Park	Ohio	
KLCK	Rickenbacker International Airport	Ohio	
KLUK	Cincinnati Municipal Lunken Airport	Ohio	111,075
KMFD	Mansfield Lahm Regional Airport	Ohio	18,469
KOSU	Ohio State University Airport	Ohio	79,796
KTZR	Bolton Field Airport	Ohio	25,659
KYNG	Youngstown–Warren Regional Airport	Ohio	27,961
KADM	Ardmore Municipal Airport	Oklahoma	20,961
KCSM	Clinton-Sherman Industrial Airpark	Oklahoma	31,601 (Note: Data are for 1997, the most recent full year reported; no newer full-year data are available.)
KLAW	Lawton-Fort Sill Regional Airport	Oklahoma	15,896
KOUN	University of Oklahoma Westheimer Airport	Oklahoma	56,548
KPWA	Wiley Post Airport	Oklahoma	62,295
KRVS	Tulsa Riverside Airport	Oklahoma	260,821
KSWO	Stillwater Regional Airport	Oklahoma	75,240
KWDG	Enid Woodring Regional Airport	Oklahoma	35,115
KEUG	Eugene Airport	Oregon	71,044
KHIO	Portland-Hillsboro Airport	Oregon	165,317
KLMT	Crater Lake–Klamath Regional Airport	Oregon	34,476
KMFR	Rogue Valley International - Medford Airport	Oregon	39,487
KOTH	Southwest Oregon Regional Airport	Oregon	16,051
KPDT	Eastern Oregon Regional Airport	Oregon	17,195
KRDM	Roberts Field Airport	Oregon	101,259
KSLE	McNary Field	Oregon	41,506
KTTD	Portland-Troutdale Airport	Oregon	97,796
KUAO	Aurora State Airport	Oregon	50,806
KAGC	Allegheny County Airport	Pennsylvania	55,926
KAVP	Wilkes-Barre/Scranton International Airport	Pennsylvania	46,381
KBVI	Beaver County Airport	Pennsylvania	
KCXY	Capital City Airport (Pennsylvania)	Pennsylvania	31,409
KERI	Erie International Airport	Pennsylvania	29,565
KIPT	Williamsport Regional Airport	Pennsylvania	13,337
KJST	Johnstown–Cambria County Airport	Pennsylvania	
KLBE	Arnold Palmer Regional Airport	Pennsylvania	44,853
KLNS	Lancaster Airport (Pennsylvania)	Pennsylvania	94,412
KPNE	Northeast Philadelphia Airport	Pennsylvania	123,435
KRDG	Reading Regional Airport	Pennsylvania	45,837
KUNV	University Park Airport	Pennsylvania	33,083
TJBQ	Rafael Hernandez Airport	Puerto Rico	37,623
TJIG	Fernando Luis Ribas Dominicci Airport	Puerto Rico	82,573
TJRV	José Aponte de la Torre Airport	Puerto Rico	
KOQU	Quonset State Airport	Rhode Island	
KCRE	Grand Strand Airport	South Carolina	47,506
KFLO	Florence Regional Airport	South Carolina	27,941
KGMU	Greenville Downtown Airport	South Carolina	75,916
KGYH	Donaldson Air Force Base	South Carolina	60,317
KHXD	Hilton Head Airport	South Carolina	34,704
KFSD	Sioux Falls Regional Airport	South Dakota	79,741
KRAP	Rapid City Regional Airport	South Dakota	49,396
KJWN	John C Tune Airport	Tennessee	88,826
KMKL	McKellar–Sipes Regional Airport	Tennessee	28,141
KMQY	Smyrna Airport (Tennessee)	Tennessee	104,122
KNQA	Millington-Memphis Airport	Tennessee	20,656
KTRI	Tri-Cities Regional Airport	Tennessee	49,283
KACT	Waco Regional Airport	Texas	86,918
KADS	Addison Airport	Texas	121,136
KAFW	Fort Worth Alliance Airport	Texas	111,468
KBAZ	New Braunfels National Airport	Texas	83,943
KBPT	Jack Brooks Regional Airport	Texas	23,382
KBRO	Brownsville/South Padre Island International Airport	Texas	23,462
KCLL	Easterwood Field Airport	Texas	73,892
KCNW	TSTC Waco Airport	Texas	57,867
KCXO	Conroe/North Houston Regional Airport	Texas	112,495
KDTO	Denton Enterprise Airport	Texas	184,012
KDWH	David Wayne Hooks Memorial Airport	Texas	164,824
KEDC	Austin Executive Airport	Texas	59,906
KEFD	Ellington Airport (Texas)	Texas	
KFTW	Fort Worth Meacham International Airport	Texas	216,544
KFWS	Fort Worth Spinks Airport	Texas	65,666
KGGG	East Texas Regional Airport	Texas	68,228
KGKY	Arlington Municipal Airport	Texas	106,982
KGLS	Scholes International Airport at Galveston	Texas	45,426
KGPM	Grand Prairie Municipal Airport	Texas	94,857
KGRK	Robert Gray Army Airfield	Texas	
KGTU	Georgetown Executive Airport	Texas	109,780
KGVT	Majors Airport	Texas	
KGYI	North Texas Regional Airport	Texas	74,657
KHQZ	Mesquite Metro Airport	Texas	108,634
KHYI	San Marcos Regional Airport	Texas	101,869
KLRD	Laredo International Airport	Texas	42,037
KMFE	Mc Allen Miller International Airport	Texas	63,554
KRBD	Dallas Executive Airport	Texas	94,309
KSGR	Sugar Land Regional Airport	Texas	89,556
KSJT	San Angelo Regional Airport	Texas	105,044
KSKF	Kelly Field	Texas	
KSPS	Wichita Falls Municipal Airport	Texas	
KSSF	Stinson Municipal Airport	Texas	92,695
KTKI	McKinney National Airport	Texas	139,196
KTME	Houston Executive Airport	Texas	73,781
KTYR	Tyler Pounds Regional Airport	Texas	37,040
KVCT	Victoria Regional Airport	Texas	49,627
KOGD	Ogden-Hinckley Airport	Utah	124,278
KPVU	Provo Municipal Airport	Utah	164,130
TISX	Henry E Rohlsen Airport	Virgin Islands	31,547
KBKT	Blackstone Army Airfield	Virginia	
KCHO	Charlottesville-Albemarle Airport	Virginia	129,316
KHEF	Manassas Regional Airport	Virginia	105,856
KLYH	Lynchburg Regional Airport	Virginia	92,491
KPHF	Newport News/Williamsburg International Airport	Virginia	60,795
KWAL	Wallops Flight Facility	Virginia	
KALW	Walla Walla Regional Airport	Washington	38,397
KBFI	Boeing Field	Washington	99,681
KBLI	Bellingham International Airport	Washington	53,052
KMWH	Grant County International Airport	Washington	66,594
KOLM	Olympia Regional Airport	Washington	59,086
KPAE	Paine Field	Washington	165,787
KPSC	Tri-Cities Airport (Washington)	Washington	53,350
KRNT	Renton Municipal Airport	Washington	81,789
KSFF	Felts Field Airport	Washington	71,057
KTIW	Tacoma Narrows Airport	Washington	102,701
KYKM	Yakima Air Terminal	Washington	40,379
KCKB	North Central West Virginia Airport	West Virginia	32,347
KHLG	Wheeling Ohio County Airport	West Virginia	14,066
KHTS	Tri-State Airport	West Virginia	19,839
KLWB	Greenbrier Valley Airport	West Virginia	11,795
KMGW	Morgantown Municipal Airport	West Virginia	44,180
KMRB	Eastern WV Regional Airport	West Virginia	
KPKB	Mid-Ohio Valley Regional Airport	West Virginia	28,188
KATW	Appleton International Airport	Wisconsin	46,832
KCMY	Sparta/Fort McCoy Airport	Wisconsin	
KCWA	Central Wisconsin Airport	Wisconsin	11,635
KEAU	Chippewa Valley Regional Airport	Wisconsin	27,055
KENW	Kenosha Regional Airport	Wisconsin	41,103
KJVL	Southern Wisconsin Regional Airport	Wisconsin	55,502
KLSE	La Crosse Regional Airport	Wisconsin	20,953
KMWC	Lawrence J Timmerman Airport	Wisconsin	26,491
KOSH	Wittman Regional Airport	Wisconsin	86,592
KUES	Waukesha County Airport	Wisconsin	78,032
KCPR	Casper/Natrona County International Airport	Wyoming	48,904
KCYS	Cheyenne Regional Airport	Wyoming	33,911 (Note: Data are for 2022, the most recent full year reported; no newer full-year data are available.)
KGUR	Camp Guernsey Airport	Wyoming	
KJAC	Jackson Hole Airport	Wyoming	35,439

== See also ==
- List of Class B airports in the United States
- List of Class C airports in the United States
