= List of Class C airports in the United States =

Class C is a class of airspace in the United States which follows International Civil Aviation Organization (ICAO) air space designation. Class C airspace areas are designed to improve aviation safety by reducing the risk of mid-air collisions in the terminal area and enhance the management of air traffic operations therein. Aircraft operating in these airspace areas are subject to certain operating rules and equipment requirements.

Class C airspace protects the approach and departure paths from aircraft not under air traffic control. All aircraft inside Class C airspace are subject to air traffic control. Traffic operating under VFR must be in communication with a controller before entering the airspace. The airspace is similar to Class B's "upside-down wedding cake", but much smaller and simpler. The innermost ring with a radius of 5 nautical miles (9 km) typically extends from the surface area around the airport to 4,000 feet (1,220 m) AGL (above ground level; charted in MSL), and an outer ring, with a radius of 10 nautical miles (19 km) that typically surrounds the inner ring and extends from a floor at 1,200 feet (370 m) AGL, (also charted in MSL), to the ceiling at 4,000 feet (1,220 m) AGL, (again charted in MSL). These dimensions are sometimes highly customized when deemed necessary to accommodate IFR traffic patterns and other surrounding airspace design issues such as the overlapping or close proximities to other classes of airspace.

As of January 2023, there are 122 Class C airports in the United States (counting NAS Whiting Field as 2 different airports).

The following list of Class C airports is sorted by state/territory and ICAO airport code.

== United States ==
ICAO airport code	Airport	State	Operations
KBHM	Birmingham–Shuttlesworth International Airport	Alabama	102,916
KHSV	Huntsville International Airport (Carl T. Jones Field)	Alabama	62,155
KMOB	Mobile Regional Airport	Alabama	72,940
PANC	Ted Stevens Anchorage International Airport	Alaska	295,479
KDMA	Davis Monthan Air Force Base	Arizona	(Note: Operations at military-operated towers are not reported to the FAA's Operations Network (OPSNET), so no count is available.)
KTUS	Tucson International Airport	Arizona	128,463
KLIT	Little Rock National Airport (Adams Field)	Arkansas	89,732
KXNA	Northwest Arkansas Regional Airport (Fayetteville/Springdale)	Arkansas	50,692
KBAB	Beale Air Force Base	California	
KBUR	Bob Hope Airport (Burbank)	California	159,392
KFAT	Fresno Yosemite International Airport	California	90,817
KMRY	Monterey Regional Airport	California	54,094
KOAK	Oakland International Airport (Metropolitan Oakland)	California	196,017
KONT	LA/Ontario International Airport	California	112,287
KRIV	March Air Reserve Base (March Field)	California	
KSBA	Santa Barbara Municipal Airport	California	105,001
KSJC	San Jose International Airport	California	156,655
KSMF	Sacramento International Airport	California	144,821
KSNA	John Wayne Airport (Orange County)	California	344,704
KCOS	Colorado Springs Airport (City of Colorado Springs Municipal)	Colorado	176,628
KBDL	Bradley International Airport	Connecticut	85,169
KDAB	Daytona Beach International Airport	Florida	332,044
KDJT	President Donald J. Trump International Airport	Florida	158,758
KFLL	Fort Lauderdale–Hollywood International Airport	Florida	297,037
KJAX	Jacksonville International Airport	Florida	108,635
KNDZ	Naval Air Station Whiting Field (South)	Florida	
KNPA	Naval Air Station Pensacola	Florida	
KNSE	Naval Air Station Whiting Field (North)	Florida	
KPNS	Pensacola International Airport	Florida	142,558
KRSW	Southwest Florida International Airport (Fort Myers)	Florida	99,968
KSFB	Orlando Sanford International Airport	Florida	391,564
KSRQ	Sarasota–Bradenton International Airport	Florida	152,616
KTLH	Tallahassee International Airport	Florida	66,769
KSAV	Savannah/Hilton Head International Airport	Georgia	116,231
PHOG	Kahului Airport (Maui)	Hawaii	119,518
KBOI	Boise Airport (Boise Air Terminal/Gowen Field)	Idaho	141,284
KCMI	University of Illinois Willard Airport (Champaign–Urbana)	Illinois	67,827
KMDW	Chicago Midway International Airport	Illinois	210,930
KMLI	Quad City International Airport (Moline)	Illinois	67,365
KPIA	General Wayne A. Downing Peoria International Airport	Illinois	46,701
KSPI	Abraham Lincoln Capital Airport (Springfield)	Illinois	24,670
KEVV	Evansville Regional Airport	Indiana	43,457
KFWA	Fort Wayne International Airport	Indiana	39,729
KIND	Indianapolis International Airport	Indiana	198,686
KSBN	South Bend Regional Airport (Michiana Regional Transportation Center/Bendix Field/St. Joseph County)	Indiana	44,318
KCID	The Eastern Iowa Airport (Cedar Rapids)	Iowa	44,999
KDSM	Des Moines International Airport	Iowa	95,151
KICT	Wichita Dwight D. Eisenhower National Airport	Kansas	119,654
KLEX	Blue Grass Airport (Lexington)	Kentucky	92,719
KSDF	Louisville International Airport (Standiford Field)	Kentucky	189,006
KBAD	Barksdale Air Force Base	Louisiana	
KBTR	Baton Rouge Metropolitan Airport (Ryan Field)	Louisiana	64,780
KLFT	Lafayette Regional Airport	Louisiana	41,216
KSHV	Shreveport Regional Airport	Louisiana	34,875
KBGR	Bangor International Airport	Maine	41,642
KPWM	Portland International Jetport	Maine	63,529
KFNT	Bishop International Airport (Flint)	Michigan	54,232
KGRR	Gerald R. Ford International Airport (Grand Rapids)	Michigan	80,671
KLAN	Capital Region International Airport (Lansing)	Michigan	40,304
KCBM	Columbus Air Force Base	Mississippi	
KJAN	Jackson–Evers International Airport	Mississippi	42,212
KSGF	Springfield–Branson National Airport	Missouri	72,167
KBIL	Billings Logan International Airport	Montana	105,276
KLNK	Lincoln Airport	Nebraska	79,625
KOFF	Offutt Air Force Base	Nebraska	
KOMA	Eppley Airfield (Omaha)	Nebraska	107,960
KRNO	Reno–Tahoe International Airport	Nevada	125,300
KMHT	Manchester–Boston Regional Airport	New Hampshire	43,915
KACY	Atlantic City International Airport	New Jersey	50,953
KABQ	Albuquerque International Sunport	New Mexico	148,405
KALB	Albany International Airport	New York	64,383
KBUF	Buffalo Niagara International Airport	New York	77,123
KISP	Long Island MacArthur Airport (Islip)	New York	170,453
KROC	Greater Rochester International Airport	New York	80,935
KSYR	Syracuse Hancock International Airport	New York	68,871
KAVL	Asheville Regional Airport	North Carolina	73,330
KFAY	Fayetteville Regional Airport (Grannis Field)	North Carolina	38,624
KGSO	Piedmont Triad International Airport (Greensboro)	North Carolina	104,876
KPOB	Pope Army Airfield	North Carolina	
KRDU	Raleigh–Durham International Airport	North Carolina	218,711
KCAK	Akron–Canton Airport	Ohio	53,272
KCMH	John Glenn Columbus International Airport	Ohio	129,127
KDAY	James M. Cox Dayton International Airport	Ohio	37,622
KTOL	Toledo Express Airport	Ohio	30,511
KOKC	Will Rogers World Airport (Oklahoma City)	Oklahoma	98,554
KTIK	Tinker Air Force Base	Oklahoma	
KTUL	Tulsa International Airport	Oklahoma	99,680
KPDX	Portland International Airport	Oregon	208,459
KABE	Lehigh Valley International Airport (Allentown–Bethlehem–Easton)	Pennsylvania	81,312
KMDT	Harrisburg International Airport (Harrisburg)	Pennsylvania	53,434
KPVD	T. F. Green Airport	Rhode Island	74,045
KCAE	Columbia Metropolitan Airport	South Carolina	71,123
KCHS	Charleston International Airport (Charleston Air Force Base)	South Carolina	131,842
KGSP	Greenville–Spartanburg International Airport	South Carolina	64,855
KMYR	Myrtle Beach International Airport	South Carolina	153,026
KSSC	Shaw Air Force Base	South Carolina	91,000
KBNA	Nashville International Airport	Tennessee	289,055
KCHA	Chattanooga Metropolitan Airport (Lovell Field)	Tennessee	90,602
KTYS	McGhee Tyson Airport (Knoxville)	Tennessee	129,312
KABI	Abilene Regional Airport	Texas	45,548
KAMA	Rick Husband Amarillo International Airport	Texas	41,802
KAUS	Austin–Bergstrom International Airport	Texas	264,642
KCRP	Corpus Christi International Airport	Texas	80,620
KDLF	Laughlin Air Force Base	Texas	
KDYS	Dyess Air Force Base	Texas	
KELP	El Paso International Airport	Texas	94,538
KHRL	Valley International Airport (Harlingen)	Texas	39,785
KLBB	Lubbock Preston Smith International Airport	Texas	79,426
KMAF	Midland International Airport (Midland–Odessa)	Texas	56,372
KSAT	San Antonio International Airport	Texas	158,290
KBTV	Burlington International Airport	Vermont	83,016
KORF	Norfolk International Airport	Virginia	86,317
KRIC	Richmond International Airport	Virginia	108,573
KROA	Roanoke Regional Airport	Virginia	66,748
KGEG	Spokane International Airport	Washington	68,152
KNUW	Naval Air Station Whidbey Island	Washington	
KSKA	Fairchild Air Force Base	Washington	
KCRW	Yeager Airport (Charleston)	West Virginia	67,093
KGRB	Austin Straubel International Airport (Green Bay)	Wisconsin	54,684
KMKE	Milwaukee Mitchell International Airport (Milwaukee)	Wisconsin	98,554
KMSN	Dane County Regional–Truax Field (Madison)	Wisconsin	94,062

== United States territories ==
=== Puerto Rico ===
- TJSJ Luís Muñoz Marin International Airport (San Juan)

=== Virgin Islands ===
- TIST Cyril E. King Airport (Charlotte Amalie, St. Thomas)

== See also ==
- List of Class B airports in the United States
- List of Class D airports in the United States
- Terminal radar service area
