= Sidney Taylor =

Sidney or Sid Taylor may refer to:

- Sidney H. Taylor Field
- Sidney Taylor, character in After Tomorrow
- Sid Taylor, see Theodore Racing
