= Spruce Creek Airport =

Private airport near Daytona Beach, FL, US

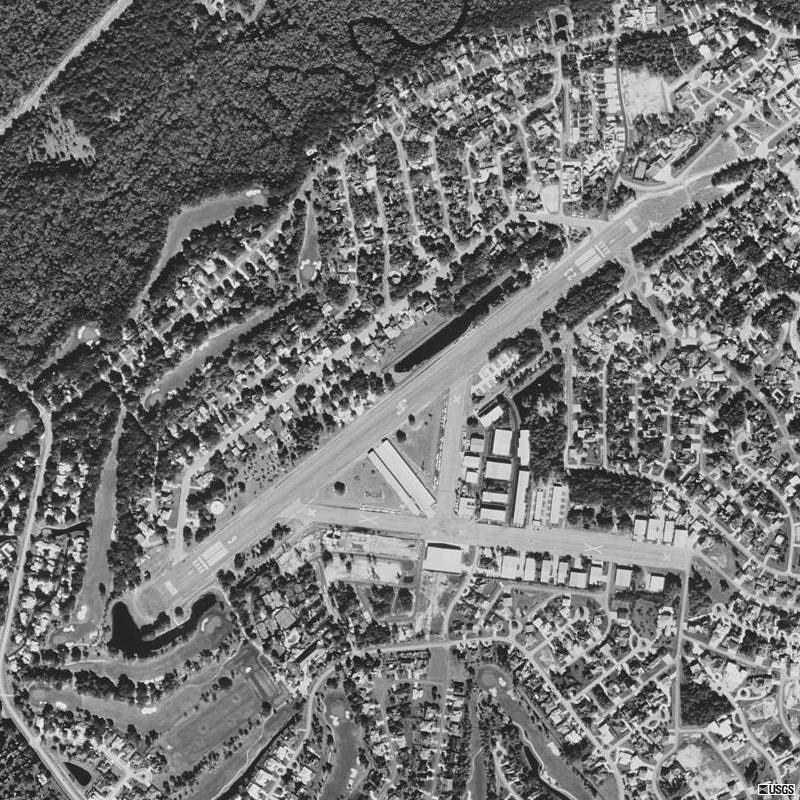
- IATA: none; ICAO: none; FAA LID: 7FL6

Summary
- Airport type: Private
- Owner/Operator: Spruce Creek Prop. Owners Assoc. Inc.
- Serves: Daytona Beach, Florida, U.S.
- Location: Port Orange, Florida, U.S.
- Elevation AMSL: 24 ft (7.3 m)
- Coordinates: 29°04′49″N 081°02′48″W
- Website: http://www.airport7fl6.com

Map
- Location within Volusia County Location within Florida Location within the United States

Runways
Direction	Length		Surface
Direction	ft	m	Surface
6/24	4,000	1,219	Asphalt

Statistics
- Aircraft operations: 25,000
- Based aircraft: 438
- Source: Federal Aviation Administration

Spruce Creek Airport (FAA LID: 7FL6) is a private airport located in Port Orange, seven miles (11 km) south of the central business district of Daytona Beach, Florida, United States. It was originally constructed during World War II as an outlying field (OLF) to nearby Naval Air Station DeLand and NAS Daytona Beach. OLF Spruce Creek originally had four paved 4,000-foot runways and was abandoned by the U.S. Navy in 1946.

== History ==
The Spruce Creek Airport was founded in 1974 on a former World War II naval airfield.

== Facilities and aircraft ==
The Spruce Creek Airport covers an area of 1,350 acres (550 ha), which contains one asphalt-paved runway (6/24) measuring 4,000 ft × 176 ft (1,219 m × 54 m). For a 12-month period the airport had 25,000 general aviation aircraft operations, an average of 68 per day. There are 438 aircraft based at this airport: 67% single-engine and 31% multi-engine airplanes as well as 1% jet and 1% helicopter.

The airport has a fixed-base operator.

== Accidents and incidents ==
- On July 17, 1999, an experimental Bushby M II aircraft collided with the ground shortly after takeoff from the Spruce Creek Airport. The probable cause of the accident was found to be the pilot's failure to securely reconnect the distributor coil wire during routine maintenance.
- On March 22, 2003, a Great Lakes Biplane crashed just after takeoff from the Spruce Creek Airport. The probable cause of the accident was found to be the pilot's improper preflight planning/decision to perform a second flight with known deficiencies in equipment, and his failure to maintain airspeed above the airplane's stall speed while maneuvering to reverse direction to land, after the engine subsequently ceased to operate, which resulted in a stall/mush, an inflight loss of control, an uncontrolled descent, and an impact with a ditch.
- On February 18, 2004, a Robinson R-44 sustained substantial damage when it collided with terrain during aerial taxi for takeoff from the Spruce Creek Airport. The probable cause of the accident was found to be the pilot's inadequate compensation for wind conditions while hover taxiing, which resulted in a loss of control and subsequent in-flight collision with terrain and a rollover of the helicopter.
- On April 14, 2004, a Beech 300 Super King Air crashed while maneuvering to land at the Spruce Creek Airport. The probable cause of the accident was found to be the pilot's inadequate management of the airplane's fuel system, which resulted in fuel starvation, a loss of engine power, a forced landing, and damage to the airplane during the landing.
- On January 21, 2005, an experimental Velocity XL crashed while landing at the Spruce Creek Airport. The probable cause of the accident was found to be the pilot's failure to maintain directional control of the airplane during the landing roll resulting in the on-ground collision with a fence and a ditch.
- On February 22, 2005, a Howard Aircraft DGA-15 ground looped during landing at the Spruce Creek Airport. The probable cause of the accident was found to be maintenance personnel's failure to detect corrosion in the landing gear strut, resulting in the gear collapsing during landing and damage to the airplane.
- On April 26, 2013, a Piper PA28 was substantially damaged when it impacted terrain shortly after takeoff at Spruce Creek Airport. The probable cause of the accident was found to be a partial loss of engine power during the initial climb after takeoff for reasons that could not be determined because postaccident examinations did not reveal any preimpact failures or malfunctions that would have precluded normal operation.
- On February 26, 2017, a Cirrus SR22 was destroyed when it impacted terrain shortly after takeoff from Spruce Creek Airport. The probable cause of the accident was found to be the pilot's inadvertent encounter with instrument meteorological conditions (fog) during initial climb, which resulted in a loss of control due to spatial disorientation.
- On May 22, 2018, a Cessna 140 was destroyed when it impacted terrain just after takeoff from the Spruce Creek Airport. The probable cause of the accident was found to be the pilot's inadequate fuel planning, which resulted in a total loss of engine power due to fuel starvation during the initial climb, and his failure to maintain adequate airspeed while turning back to the runway, which resulted in an exceedance of the airplane's critical angle of attack and an aerodynamic stall.
- On July 5, 2018, an experimental, amateur-built Swearingen SX-300 was destroyed during a runway excursion while landing at the Spruce Creek Airport. The pilot was fatally injured, while the passenger survived. The probable cause of the accident was found to be the pilot's failure to maintain adequate airspeed during landing, which led to the airplane exceeding its critical angle-of-attack, experiencing an aerodynamic stall and hard landing, which resulted in a landing gear collapse, loss of directional control, and runway excursion.

== See also ==
- List of airports in Florida
