= Vintage Props and Jets =

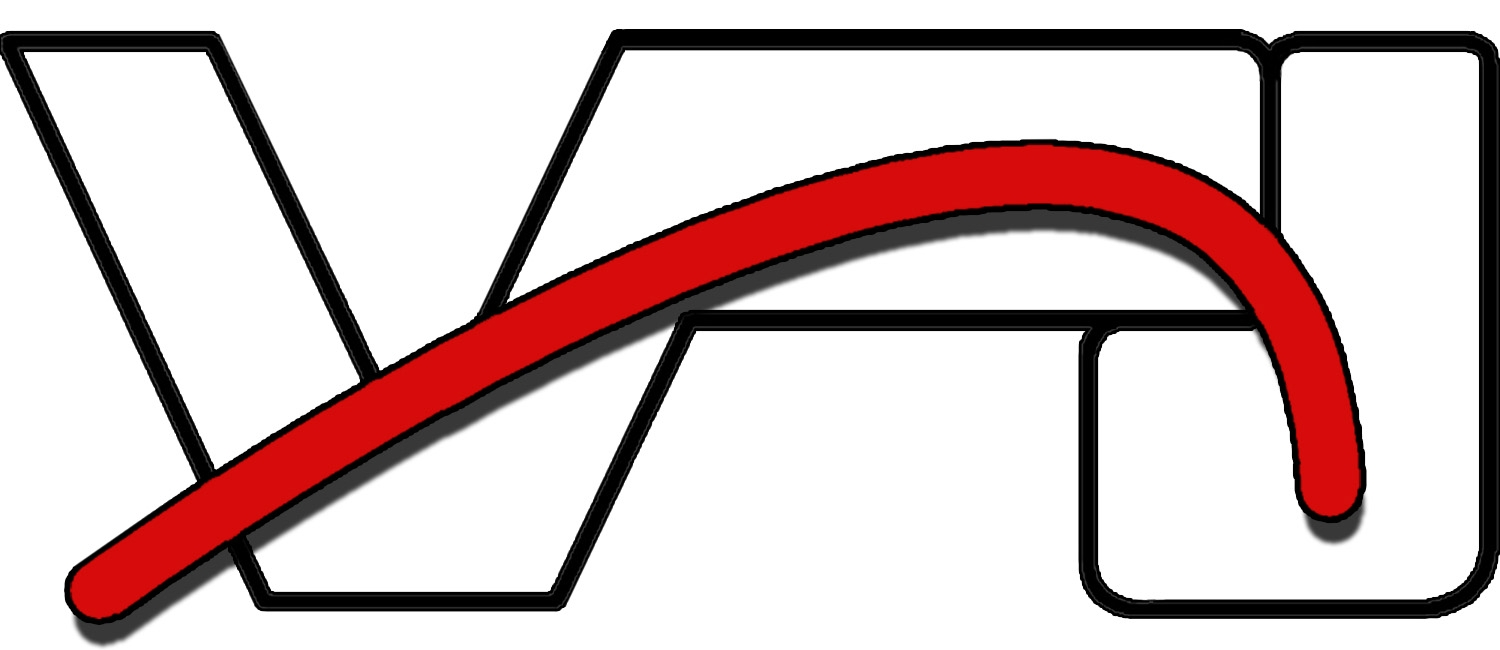
IATA	ICAO	Call sign
VQ	VPP	VINTAGE
- Founded: 1991; 34 years ago
- Ceased operations: 2008; 17 years ago
- Fleet size: 4 Beechcraft King Air, 2 Beechcraft 1900
- Destinations: 8
- Headquarters: New Smyrna Beach, Florida
- Key people: Tom Crevasse, President and Owner; Rob Waldron, CEO
- Website: http://www.vpj.com

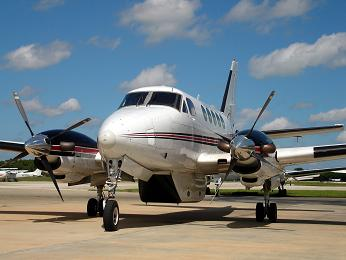
Vintage Props and Jets King Air 100

Vintage Props and Jets was a commuter airline based in New Smyrna Beach, Florida. The airline provided daily flights between selected cities in Florida and The Bahamas.

== History ==
Vintage Props and Jets had been in business as a scheduled airline since 1991, more than most carriers between Florida and the Bahamas. Vintage Props and Jets also maintained a repair station at New Smyrna Beach Airport that specialized in Beechcraft equipment. The carrier also provided aircraft management for individuals owning Beechcraft King Air 100 & 200 series equipment; but its core operations remained the scheduled airline service. The airline started looking for ways to increase revenues during the off-season and embarked on adding west-coast Florida operations in 2007, which included Naples, Key West, and Tampa. The carrier also bid on EAS markets in an attempt to help increase overall flying. In the summer of 2008, Vintage had wet leased an Embraer ERJ-145 regional jet from ExpressJet Airlines to operate select Saturday-only services between Daytona Beach, Ft Lauderdale, and Jacksonville to and from Marsh Harbour and Treasure Cay in the Bahamas.

The airline had bid for EAS services between Athens, Georgia; Macon, Georgia; Atlanta, Georgia and Sanford/Orlando, Florida.

On July 18, 2008, Vintage Props and Jets ceased operations and filed for Chapter 11 bankruptcy protection as it struggled with rising fuel costs & aircraft maintenance expenses.

== Destinations ==
Florida

- Daytona Beach
- Melbourne
- Fort Lauderdale
- Marathon
- Key West
- Naples - Seasonal
- Jacksonville - Seasonal (Saturdays Only)
- Key West - Seasonal

Bahamas

- Treasure Cay
- Marsh Harbour
- Freeport

== Fleet ==
- Beechcraft King Air turboprops (100 and 200 series models)
- Beechcraft 1900 turboprops
- Embraer ERJ-145 regional jet (wet leased from ExpressJet)

== See also ==
- List of defunct airlines of the United States
