= Ann Arbor Municipal Airport =

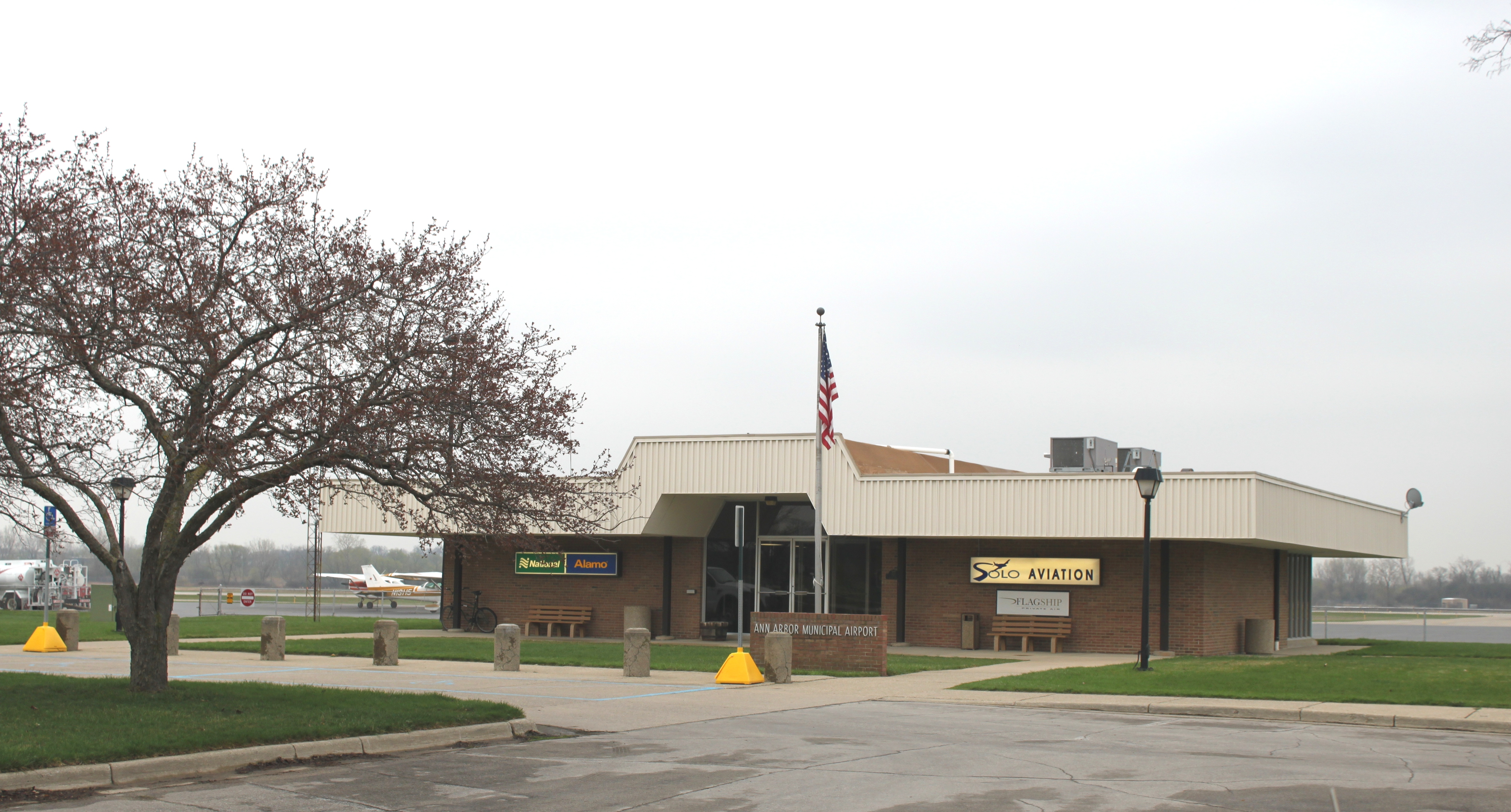
- Airport passenger terminal

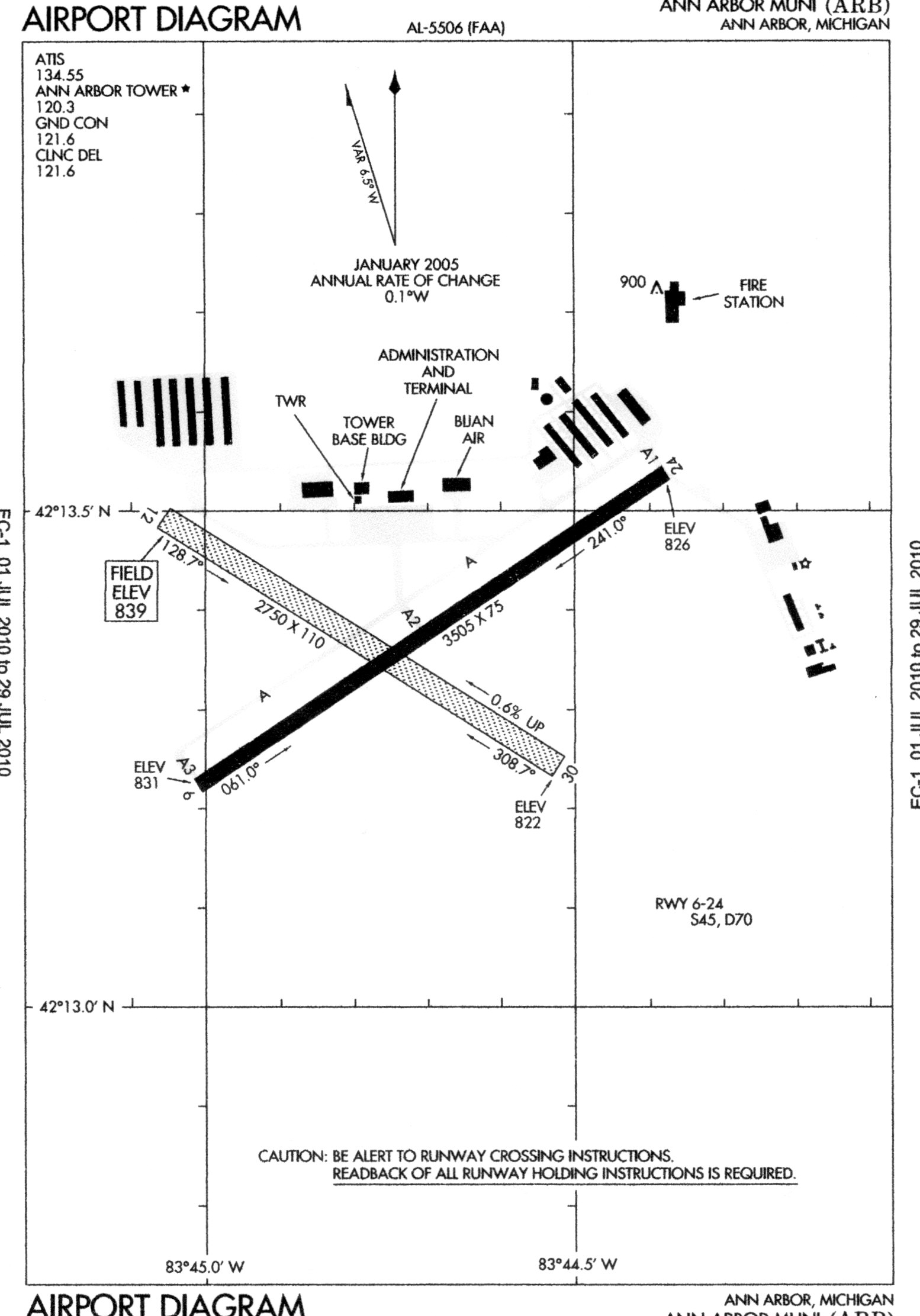
- FAA airport diagram
- IATA: ARB; ICAO: KARB; FAA LID: ARB

Summary
- Airport type: Public
- Owner: City of Ann Arbor
- Operator: City of Ann Arbor
- Serves: Washtenaw County, Michigan
- Location: City of Ann Arbor (exclave surrounded by Pittsfield Township)
- Elevation AMSL: 839 ft / 256 m
- Coordinates: 42°13′23″N 083°44′44″W

Map
- Location of airport in Michigan ARB (the United States)

Runways
| Direction | Length | | Surface |
| Direction | ft | m | Surface |
|---|---|---|---|
| 6/24 | 3,500 | 1,067 | Concrete |
| 12/30 | 2,750 | 838 | Turf |

Statistics (2021)
- Aircraft Movements: 75,200
- Based Aircraft: 152
- Source: AirNav.com

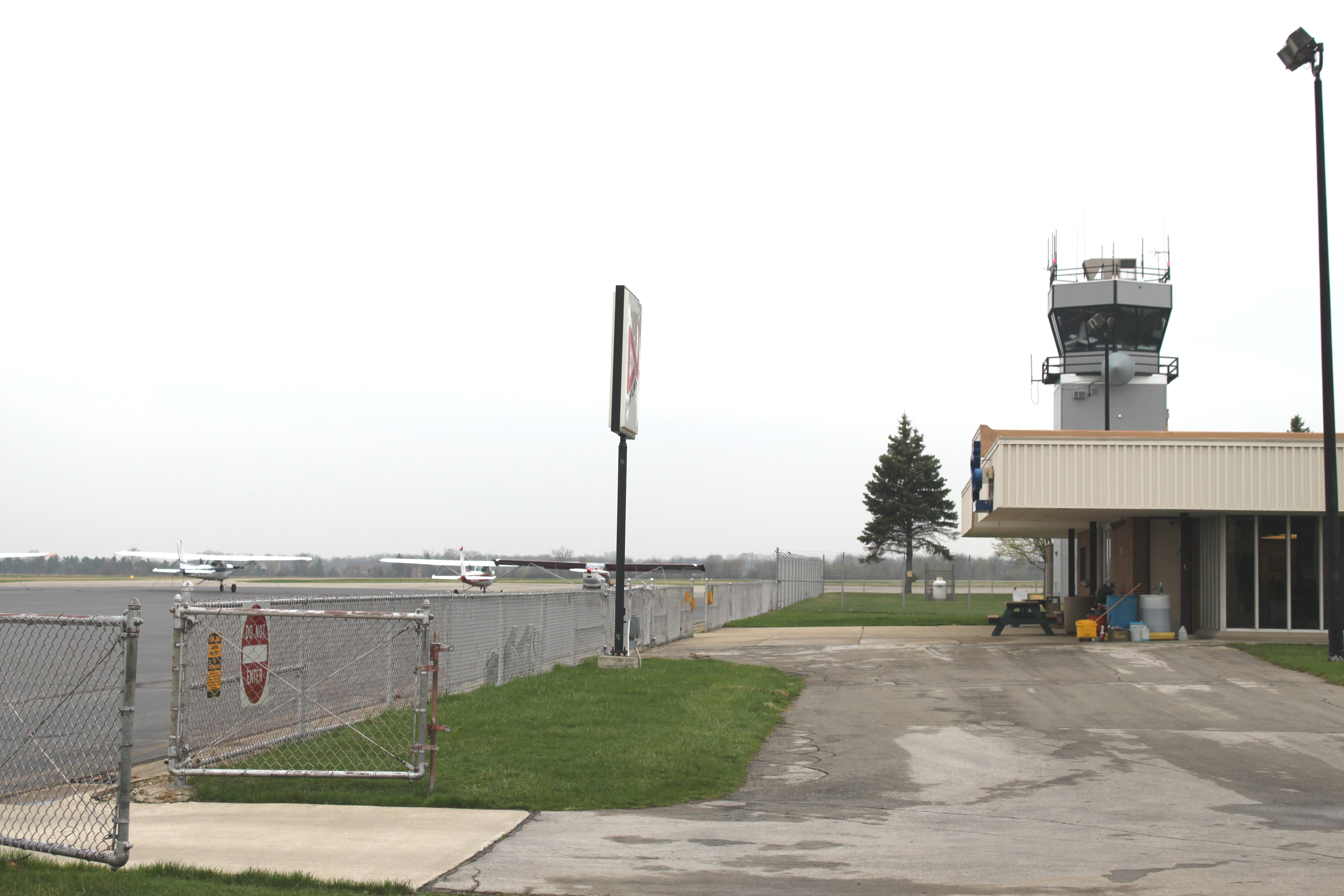
Airport control tower, passenger terminal and tarmac

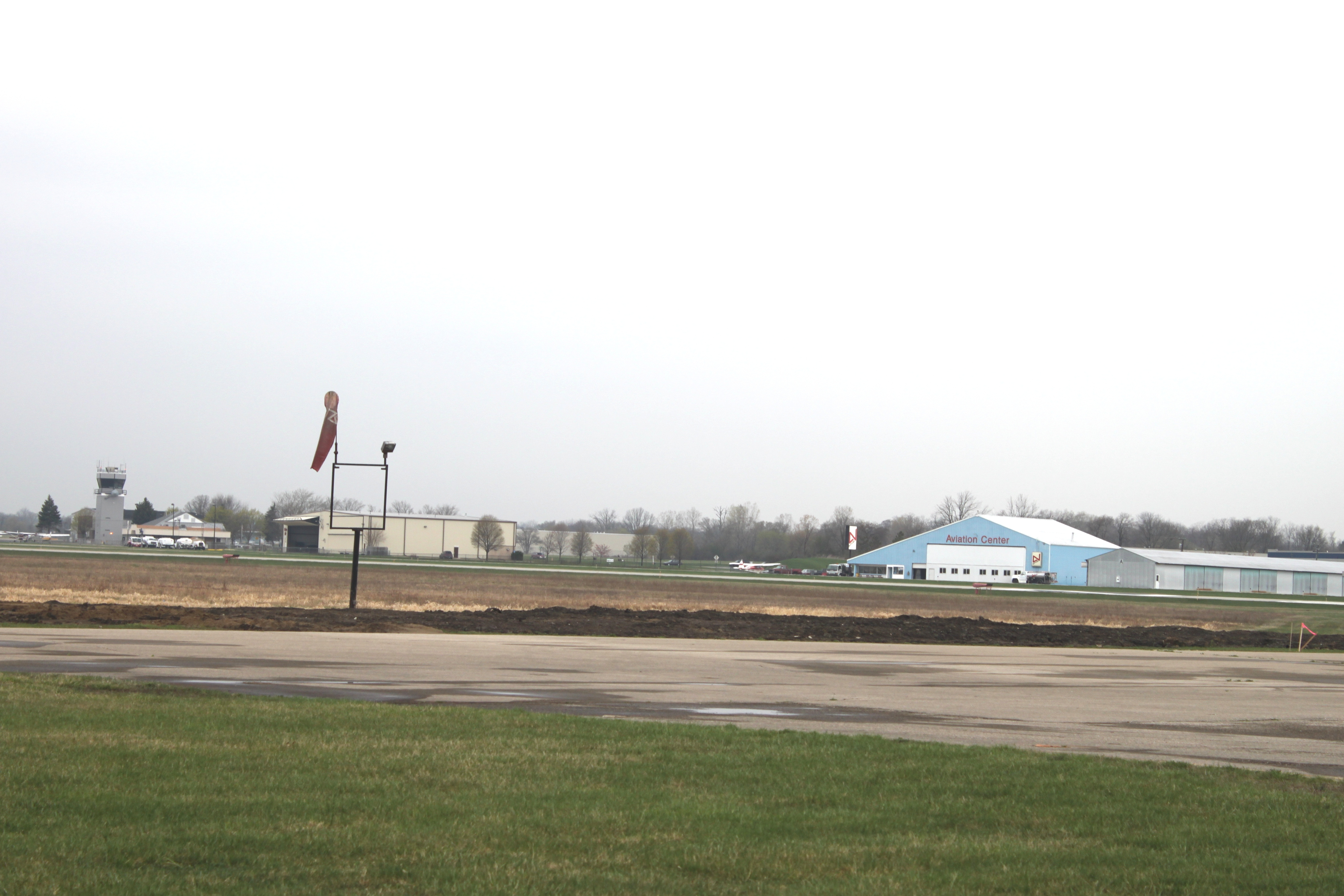
Airport viewed from State Road

Ann Arbor Municipal Airport (IATA: ARB, ICAO: KARB, FAA LID: ARB) is a general aviation airport in Washtenaw County, Michigan, United States. It is included in the Federal Aviation Administration (FAA) National Plan of Integrated Airport Systems for 2017 to 2021, in which it is categorized as a regional general aviation facility.

The airport is located in Pittsfield Township, but is owned and operated by the City of Ann Arbor. The airport property was annexed by the City of Ann Arbor for water rights before Pittsfield became a charter township in 1972. About 15% of the water pumped to Ann Arbor's Water Treatment Plant comes from wells located at the city's airport. Pittsfield Township provides police and fire services to the airport when required. Despite being located entirely within the boundaries of Pittsfield, the township has no voting representation on any committee, council or board tasked with the management of airport operations. The airport is located about 4.3 miles (6.9 km) south of downtown Ann Arbor.

The airport is a general aviation facility with mostly smaller corporate and private aircraft, with no scheduled passenger or cargo flights. The airport is also occasionally used by aircraft transporting patients to the University of Michigan Health System. The UMHS keeps its Survival Flight helicopters at the airport, but does not keep its fixed-wing Survival Flight jet aircraft at the site because of the lack of 24-hour control tower staffing.

As of 2013, the airport's annual budget was around $800,000, which the city makes by renting hangars and imposing fuel surcharges; the city does not allocate funds to the airport.

== History ==
Built in 1928, Ann Arbor Municipal Airport is a class II airport.

The Ann Arbor City Council established an Airport Advisory Committee in 1961; the Ann Arbor city council appoints seven people (full voting members) serving three-year terms, and Pittsfield Charter Township and Lodi Township each appoint a non-voting representative to the committee.

Runway expansions have been proposed since the 1980s but have been denied on each occasion by city councils. The need for runway expansion on safety grounds is unclear as purported over-runs were actually off the side of the runway and attributed to pilot error after investigation. The most recent proposed runway expansion project, first floated to the Ann Arbor City Council in 2007, proposes lengthening the runway by 800 feet and moving the entire runway toward the south west corner of the airport (closer to neighboring residential subdivisions). This would not change the airport's classification but could affect the size of the aircraft using the airport. All B-II small aircraft are currently capable of operating on the existing 3,505 ft runway without weight restriction. However, larger airplanes (jets) already do use this B-II certified runway but with weight and fuel restrictions. Any extension to the runway will not change the operation of B-II classification aircraft but will allow larger aircraft (jets in the C-I and C-II categories) to land and operate out of the airport with full weight and fuel. The proposal is undergoing environmental impact studies but has experienced delays because of initial inaccuracies supplied in the proposal, prolonged review by the FAA, and opposition from Pittsfield Township and the local citizens' group Committee for Preserving Community Quality, made up of citizens from Pittsfield and Lodi, as well as some Ann Arborites who view the project as too expensive or unlikely to be approved. On March 24, 2009, Pittsfield unanimously approved a Resolution Opposing Proposed Expansion of the Ann Arbor Municipal Airport Runway. Lodi Township, which is adjacent to Pittsfield on the west side and also impacted by ARB, passed a similar resolution on May 12, 2009. A legal petition has been made to the Secretary of Transportation Washington, D.C. in opposition to the proposed expansion.

A plan to reignite this runway expansion arose in 2017.

== Facilities and aircraft ==
Ann Arbor Municipal Airport covers 837 acres (3.39 km^{2}) and has two runways:

- Main Runway 6/24: 3,500 ft × 75 ft (1,067 m × 23 m), surface: concrete
- Secondary Runway 12/30: 2,750 ft × 110 ft (838 m × 34 m), surface: grass

The grass runway intersects the paved runway and is used during the summertime. In 2013 there were almost 170 aircraft hangars at the airport.

The airport has an operating control tower that is operated by the FAA. The airport is located in FAA Class "D" airspace. There has been a gradual reduction in operations at the airport (both itinerant and local) since a peak in 1999.

The airport has two FBOs that together offer fuel, general maintenance, aircraft parking, courtesy cars, pilot supplies, crew lounges, snooze rooms, showers, and more. The Ann Arbor City Council in late 2022 approved a plan to replace one of the FBOs with a new operator by voting to decline the current operator's lease at the airport.

For the 12-month period ending December 31, 2021, the airport had 75,200 aircraft operations, an average of 206 per day, consisting completely of general aviation. For the same time period, there were 152 aircraft based at the airport: 133 single-engine and 12 multi-engine airplanes, 5 helicopters, 1 jet, and 1 glider.

== Accidents and incidents ==
- On October 7, 1989, a Piper PA-28 Cherokee crashed in Ann Arbor due to the pilot's failure to maintain sufficient airspeed, leading to an inadvertent stall.
- On January 20, 2001, a Cessna 152 collided with a snow bank while landing in Ann Arbor. The student pilot aboard brought the approach in too low and pulled power idle too soon, causing the aircraft to sink and touch down 10 feet before the approach end of the runway. The aircraft impacted a snow bank, and the aircraft's nose gear was pushed under the belly while the right main gear was separated from the wheel assembly. The probable cause was found to be the CFI's delay in initiating remedial action to arrest the sink rate which developed on final approach.
- On June 21, 2001, a Masko Mustang MII impacted terrain while operating in ARB's traffic pattern. Witnesses report the aircraft made a steep right turn prior to spiraling to the ground. The probable cause was found to be the pilot's failure to maintain control of the airplane resulting in the inadvertent stall/spin.
- On October 17, 2001, a Piper PA-34 Seneca sustained substantial damage while landing at Ann Arbor. The aircraft overran the runway while attempting to land. The probable cause was found to be the pilot's failure to maintain directional control during the landing, with a crosswind as a contributing factor.
- On October 26, 2003, a Schweizer 269C was damaged during a forced landing due to an engine failure and subsequent autorotation. After takeoff, the aircraft suddenly yawed left, and the engine began to uncontrollably increase and decrease speed as if the throttle was being rolled on and off. No annunciator lights illuminated during the initial sequence. The engine subsequently made popping noises and continued to yaw uncontrollable until touchdown. The probable cause was found to be the loss of engine power due to carburetor ice.
- On April 8, 2005, a Cessna 172 Skyhawk was damaged during a forced landing while operating at ARB. The aircraft was attempting a go around due to an unstable approach, but when the throttle was advanced, the engine lost power. The probable cause was found to be the failure of the carburetor nozzle resulting in loss of engine power and the unsuitable terrain encountered during the forced landing.
- On August 29, 2009, a Socata TBM 700 was damaged during landing in Ann Arbor. The probable cause was found to be the pilot's hard landing during gusty wind conditions.
- On May 25, 2011, a flight instructor was injured after walking into the spinning propeller of a Cessna 152 at Ann Arbor Municipal.
- On April 5, 2012, a Remos Gx crashed during takeoff from Ann Arbor. The solo student pilot aboard claimed the aircraft suddenly veered left during takeoff, and he was unable to correct the turn with rudder or aileron. The aircraft momentarily lifted off before pitching down in a left turn on takeoff. The probable cause of the accident was found to be the pilot's failure to maintain airplane control on takeoff, which resulted in an aerodynamic stall and collision with terrain.
- On June 9, 2013, a Cessna 172 Skyhawk experienced a landing gear during a hard landing in Ann Arbor. The aircraft bounced on landing and elected to continue the attempt, porpoising until the gear collapsed and the aircraft came to rest. The probable cause of the accident was found to be the pilot's failure to make a go-around in a timely manner and his loss of control during landing.
- On October 12, 2013, an aircraft operated by a local flying club experienced a landing gear collapse due to a hard landing at the airport. The sole pilot on board was not injured.
- On October 10, 2014, a Piper PA-28 Cherokee collided with a deer during a nighttime takeoff. The pilot aborted the takeoff. Substantial damage was found to the aircraft's forward firewall and fuselage.
- On September 11, 2022, a Cessna 152 made an emergency landing in a field near the airport due to an engine failure after takeoff. The two on board were not injured.
- On December 10, 2023, a Piper Malibu Meridian was damaged after a hard landing and runway excursion at the Ann Arbor Municipal Airport. The pilot was flying an RNAV (GPS) instrument approach procedure to the airport and experienced wind shear 50 feet above the ground and short of the runway. The wind shear forced the aircraft to the ground. After impacting the ground, the aircraft continued onto the runway. The main landing gear separated, and the airplane veered off the side of the runway before coming to a stop. The probable cause of the accident was found to be the airplane’s encounter with unexpected wind shear during final approach, which resulted in a hard landing short of the runway.

== See also ==
- List of airports in Michigan
- Willow Run Airport in nearby Ypsilanti
