= Ormond Beach Municipal Airport =

Ormond Beach Municipal Airport Ormond Beach Airport
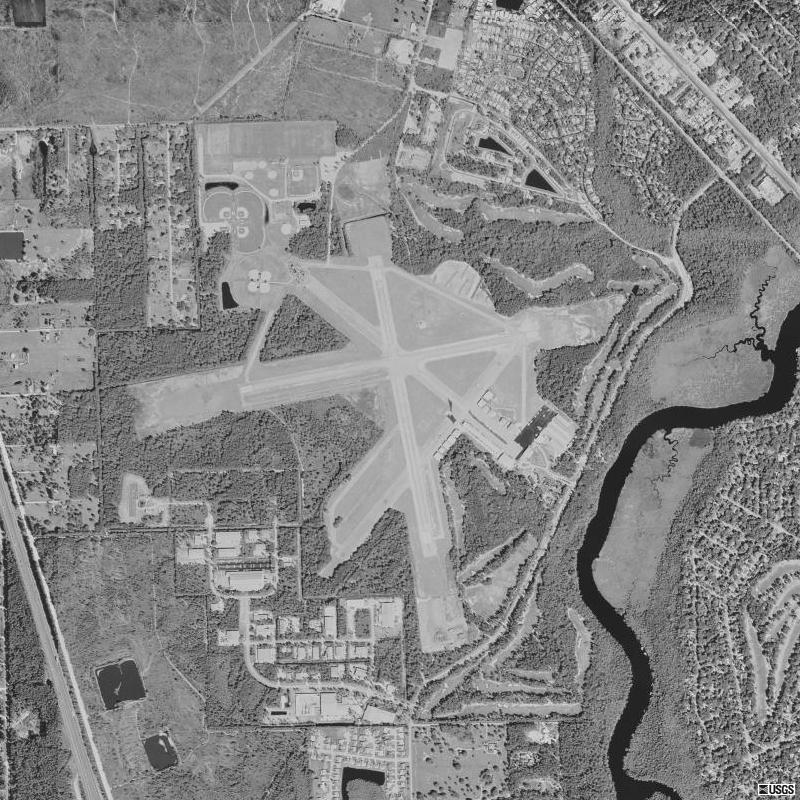
- IATA: none; ICAO: KOMN; FAA LID: OMN

Summary
- Airport type: Public
- Owner: City of Ormond Beach
- Location: Ormond Beach, Florida
- Opened: 1959
- Elevation AMSL: 28 ft (8.5 m)
- Coordinates: 29°18′04″N 81°06′49.7″W
- Website: http://www.ormondbeach.org/

Map
- Location of airport in Florida OMN (the United States)

Runways
Direction	Length		Surface
Direction	ft	m	Surface
9/27	4,005	1,221	Asphalt
17/35	3,704	1,129	Asphalt

Ormond Beach Airport (ICAO: KOMN, FAA LID: OMN), also known as Ormond Beach Municipal Airport, is a general aviation airport located 3 miles (4.8 km) to the northwest of the city of Ormond Beach in Volusia County, Florida, United States.

== History ==
OMN was established in 1943 as Outlying Field Ormond Beach (OLF Ormond Beach), a naval aviation training field under the oversight of the Naval Air Training Center at Naval Air Station Jacksonville. As an OLF, it supported wartime training operations conducted at/from Naval Air Station DeLand, Naval Air Station Daytona Beach and Naval Air Station Sanford. Military operations were discontinued at the end of World War II and the airport was deeded to the city by the U.S. Government in 1959 for use as a civilian airport.

== Facilities ==
Ormond Beach Airport covers 1,128 acres (456 ha) and has two operational, fully illuminated asphalt runways, 4,005 feet (1,221 m) and 3,704 feet (1,129 m) in length, respectively.

The airfield is home to multiple fixed-base operators and aviation service & support companies offering services including aviation gasoline and jet fuel, aircraft flight instruction and hire, aircraft servicing and aircraft interior modification and repair. The airport also provides an additional location for flight training operations from nearby Embry-Riddle Aeronautical University at Daytona Beach International Airport and also sunrise Aviation academy.

In 2003, Ormond Beach Municipal Airport received nearly $500,000 as part of the federal Airport Improvement Program to help with aviation safety and other airfield improvements.

As of 2009, the airport has an operational FAA Level 1 air traffic control tower under the FAA Contract Tower Program and a 1,000-square-foot (93 m^{2}) passenger terminal building, with 45 on-airport parking spaces. There are about 50 tie-downs for general aviation aircraft. Between the airport's T-hangars and conventional hangars are 150 covered parking spaces for aircraft.

== See also ==
- List of airports in Florida
