= List of Class B airports in the United States =

Class B is a class of airspace in the United States which follows International Civil Aviation Organization (ICAO) airspace designation. Class B airspace areas are designed to improve aviation safety by reducing the risk of midair collisions in the airspace surrounding airports with high-density air traffic operations. Aircraft operating in these airspace areas are subject to certain operating rules and equipment requirements.

Class B airspace protects the approach and departure paths from aircraft not under air traffic control. All aircraft inside Class B airspace are subject to air traffic control. Traffic operating under VFR must be identified on radar and explicitly cleared into the airspace before they can enter. The airspace is commonly depicted as resembling an "upside-down wedding cake". The innermost ring extends from the surface area around the airport to typically 10,000' MSL. Several outer rings usually surround it with progressively higher floors to allow traffic into nearby airports without entering the primary airport's Class B airspace.

The airspace around the busiest US airports is classified as ICAO Class B, and the primary airport (one or more) for which this airspace is designated is called Class B airport. As of October 2026, there are 37 Class B airports in the United States.

The following list of Class B airports is sorted by state and ICAO airport code.

Map of Class B airports in the contiguous United States

| ICAO airport code | Airport | State | Operations |
|---|---|---|---|
| KPHX | Phoenix Sky Harbor International | Arizona | 487,142 |
| KLAX | Los Angeles International | California | 580,949 |
| KNKX | Marine Corps Air Station Miramar | California | (Note: Operations at military-operated towers are not reported to the FAA's Operations Network (OPSNET), so no count is available.) |
| KSAN | San Diego International | California | 233,275 |
| KSFO | San Francisco International | California | 416,527 |
| KDEN | Denver International | Colorado | 707,268 |
| KMCO | Orlando International | Florida | 418,747 |
| KMIA | Miami International | Florida | 501,529 |
| KTPA | Tampa International | Florida | 236,630 |
| KATL | Hartsfield–Jackson Atlanta International | Georgia | 807,625 |
| PHNL | Honolulu International | Hawaii | 314,702 |
| KORD | Chicago–O'Hare International | Illinois | 857,392 |
| KCVG | Cincinnati/Northern Kentucky International | Kentucky | 154,683 |
| KMSY | Louis Armstrong New Orleans International | Louisiana | 129,678 |
| KADW | Andrews Air Force Base | Maryland | 52,880 |
| KBWI | Baltimore/Washington International | Maryland | 237,879 |
| KBOS | Boston–Logan International | Massachusetts | 419,082 |
| KDTW | Detroit Metropolitan Wayne County | Michigan | 321,759 |
| KMSP | Minneapolis–Saint Paul International | Minnesota | 342,683 |
| KMCI | Kansas City International | Missouri | 117,086 |
| KSTL | Lambert–St. Louis International | Missouri | 165,307 |
| KLAS | Las Vegas-Harry Reid International | Nevada | 586,821 |
| KEWR | Newark Liberty International | New Jersey | 397,535 |
| KJFK | New York–John F. Kennedy International | New York | 467,029 |
| KLGA | New York–La Guardia | New York | 359,780 |
| KCLT | Charlotte Douglas International | North Carolina | 568,716 |
| KCLE | Cleveland Hopkins International | Ohio | 114,969 |
| KPHL | Philadelphia International | Pennsylvania | 322,099 |
| KPIT | Pittsburgh International | Pennsylvania | 134,489 |
| KMEM | Memphis International | Tennessee | 177,190 |
| KDFW | Dallas/Fort Worth International | Texas | 741,286 |
| KHOU | Houston–Hobby | Texas | 196,253 |
| KIAH | Houston–George Bush Intercontinental | Texas | 457,843 |
| KSLC | Salt Lake City International | Utah | 333,038 |
| KDCA | Ronald Reagan Washington National | Virginia | 301,427 |
| KIAD | Washington Dulles International | Virginia | 340,369 |
| KSEA | Seattle–Tacoma International | Washington | 435,896 |

== See also ==
- List of Class C airports in the United States
- List of Class D airports in the United States
- Terminal radar service area
