= Flagler Executive Airport =

Airport in Florida, U.S.

- IATA: none; ICAO: KFIN; FAA LID: FIN

Summary
- Airport type: Public
- Owner: Flagler County
- Operator: FBO
- Serves: Palm Coast, Bunnell and Flagler Beach
- Location: 201 Airport Road; Palm Coast, FL 32164
- Elevation AMSL: 33 ft (10 m)
- Coordinates: 29°28′03″N 81°12′23″W
- Website: www.flaglercounty.gov/Government/Departments/Airport

Map
- Location of airport in Florida FIN (the United States)

Runways
Direction	Length		Surface
Direction	ft	m	Surface
11/29	5,500	1,676	Asphalt
6/24	5,001	1,524	Asphalt
18W/36W	3,000	914	Water

Helipads
Number	Length		Surface
Number	ft	m	Surface
H1	36	11	Concrete/gravel

Statistics
- Aircraft operations (2018): 158,775
- Based aircraft (2022): 37
- Source: Federal Aviation Administration

Flagler Executive Airport (ICAO: KFIN, FAA LID: FIN) is a county-owned public-use airport located three miles (5 km) east of the central business district of Bunnell, a city in Flagler County, Florida, United States. The airport's former FAA location identifiers were X47 and XFL. The airfield was originally constructed by the United States Navy during World War II as Naval Outlying Field Bunnell (NOLF Bunnell), an auxiliary airfield for flight training operations originating from nearby Naval Air Station Jacksonville, NAS Daytona Beach and NAS DeLand. Following the end of the war, the airfield was transferred from the Navy to Flagler County for use as a general aviation airport.

According to the Federal Aviation Administration (FAA) data, the airport ranks as the fourth busiest in Florida out of 105 General Aviation airports, with 190,000 takeoffs and landings per year. This is primarily due to its use as a practice field by students from nearby Embry-Riddle Aeronautical University, adjacent to Daytona Beach International Airport. as well as by Phoenix East Aviation, which maintains a base here. Due to the increase in air traffic, the Flagler County Airport now has an FAA Level 1 Contract Air Traffic Control Tower that operates from 7am - 8pm, 365 days per year.

Although most U.S. airports use the same three-letter location identifier for the FAA and IATA, Flagler Executive Airport is assigned FIN by the FAA but has no designation from the IATA.

Formerly Flagler County Airport, it was renamed April 20, 2015 following $22 million in projects and improvements completed over six years including a new control tower.

The airport is also home to the Flagler Palm Coast Army Readiness Center that opened in October 2020. Listed on the FAA Airport Diagram as a "National Guard Armory," the facility actually supports units of both the U.S. Army Reserve and the Florida Army National Guard. Although no military aircraft are permanently assigned, the facility contains a flight line ramp area capable of accommodating UH-60 Blackhawk, CH-47 Chinook, and C-130 Hercules aircraft.

In 1960, it was the site of the inaugural NHRA Winter Nationals, which jointly sanctioned by NHRA and NASCAR (the NHRA was not a member of the national governing body of motorsport, the Automobile Competition Committee for the United States, until 1965), which allowed the event to be certified for insurance regulations and FIA certification because NASCAR was a founding member of the national governing body. The inaugural Winter Nationals was part of Speed Weeks for the 1960 Daytona 500. This event was developed because of an issue of issues with illegal street racing around the Daytona event.

The airport was also a filming location for the 1990 Tom Cruise film, Days of Thunder.

== New terminal ==
In 2025, the General Aviation Terminal, location of administration offices and Fixed Base Operator (FBO), had been in use for 40 years. Planning for a replacement began in 2017, but funding at the time was not available. Construction began for the new $11.2 million facility with 15,500 square feet (1,440 m^{2}) and a projected opening in late 2026. Flagler's State representative Paul Renner was key to securing state contributions, which enabled the project. The Florida Department of Transportation issued a $5.6 million grant; the legislature appropriated another $5 million; and Flagler County's contribution was $620,000.

== Facilities and aircraft ==
Flagler Executive Airport covers an area of 1,145 acres (463 ha) and contains two paved runways, one seaplane landing area and one helipad:

- Runway 11/29: 5,500 x 100 ft (1,676 x 30 m), surface: asphalt
- Runway 6/24: 5,001 x 100 ft (1,524 x 30 m), surface: asphalt
- Runway 18W/36W: 3,000 x 500 ft (914 x 152 m), surface: water
- Helipad H1: 36 x 36 ft (11 x 11 m), surface: concrete/gravel

For the 12-month period ending February 8, 2018, the airport had 158,775 aircraft operations, an average of 435 per day: 100% general aviation and less than 1% military. In February 2022, there were 37 aircraft based at this airport: 30 single-engine, 2 multi-engine, 2 jet and 3 helicopter.

== See also ==
- List of airports in Florida
