= New Smyrna Beach Municipal Airport =

New Smyrna Beach Municipal Airport Jack Bolt Field
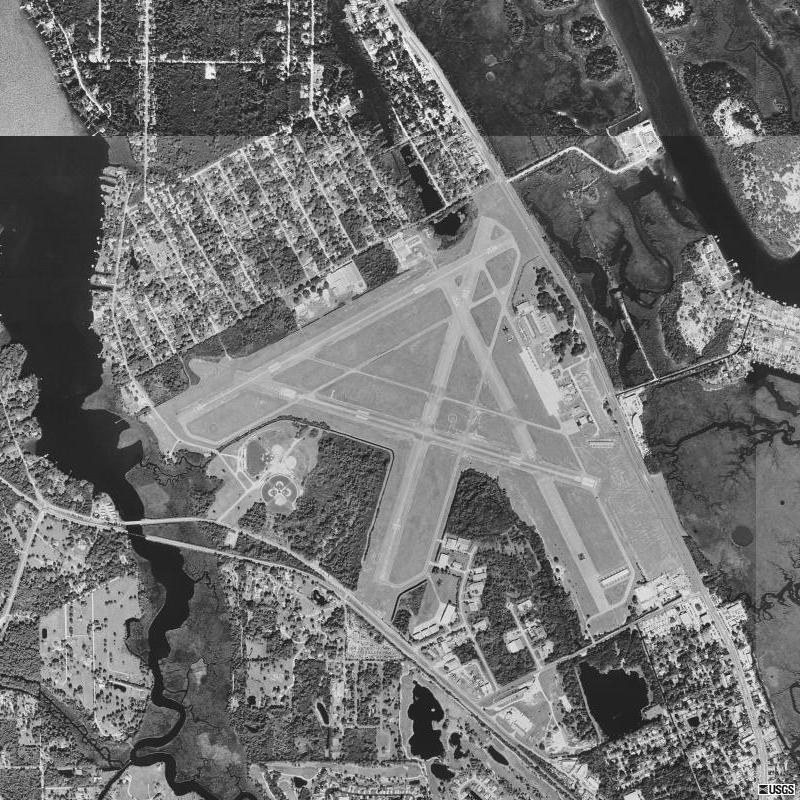
- IATA: none; ICAO: KEVB; FAA LID: EVB

Summary
- Airport type: Public
- Owner: City of New Smyrna Beach
- Serves: New Smyrna Beach, Florida, U.S.
- Elevation AMSL: 11 ft / 3 m
- Coordinates: 29°03′20″N 080°56′56″W
- Website: https://www.nsbairport.com/

Map
- Location of airport in Florida EVB (the United States)

Runways
Direction	Length		Surface
Direction	ft	m	Surface
2/20	4,000	1,219	Asphalt
7/25	5,000	1,524	Asphalt
11/29	4,319	1,316	Asphalt

Statistics (2018)
- Aircraft operations (year ending 8/14/2018): 130,986
- Based aircraft: 109
- Source: FAA, airport website

New Smyrna Beach Municipal Airport (ICAO: KEVB, FAA LID: EVB), also known as Jack Bolt Field, is a public airport located three miles (5 km) northwest of the central business district of New Smyrna Beach, a city in Volusia County, Florida, United States. It is owned by the City of New Smyrna Beach.

This airport is assigned a three-letter location identifier of EVB by the Federal Aviation Administration, but it does not have an International Air Transport Association (IATA) airport code.

== History ==
Prior to World War II, the present airport site was home to both a golf course and a grass airstrip. In 1942, the site was taken over by the U.S. Navy and the present paved runway complex constructed. Designated as Navy Outlying Landing Field New Smyrna Beach, it operated as an auxiliary field to advanced naval flight training operations being conducted at nearby Naval Air Station Daytona Beach, Naval Air Station Sanford and Naval Air Station DeLand. In 1947, NOLF New Smyrna Beach was decommissioned and the facility conveyed back to the City of New Smryna Beach for use as a civilian airport.

As a Navy airfield, the facility originally incorporated four intersecting asphalt runways. Although all paved areas remain, only three of the runways remain operational today. Prior to 2004, the airport was an uncontrolled facility. In October 2004, a Level I contract control at the airport became operational, changing the airport's status to that of a controlled field. Today the airport serves the needs of charter airlines and general aviation activities, to include flight training and corporate air travel.

In 2006, the City of New Smyrna Beach added the additional name to the airport of Jack Bolt Field in honor of the late Naval Aviator, Lieutenant Colonel John "Jack" Bolt, USMC. A former New Smyrna Beach resident, Bolt was both an aerial ace and a recipient of the Navy Cross. While flying the F4U Corsair with VMF-214, Bolt shot down six Japanese Zero fighters during World War II. During the Korean War, while on an exchange assignment with the U.S. Air Force's 39th Fighter Interceptor Squadron flying the F-86 Sabrejet, Bolt also shot down six North Korean MiG-15 jet fighters. A military aircraft propeller and a plaque commemorating Bolt's accomplishments was erected at the airport in 2006.

== Facilities and aircraft ==
New Smyrna Beach Municipal Airport covers an area of 718 acres (291 ha) which contains three asphalt paved runways:

- Runway 2/20: 4,000 x 100 ft (1,219 x 30 m)
- Runway 7/25: 5,000 x 75 ft (1,524 x 23 m), Lighted without PAPI
- Runway 11/29: 4,319 x 75 ft (1,316 x 23 m), Lighted with PAPI

For the 12-month period ending August 14, 2018, the airport had 130,986 aircraft operations, an average of 359 per day: 100% general aviation, <1% air taxi, <1% commercial, and <1% military. There was 109 aircraft based at this airport: 81 single-engine, 25 multi-engine, 2 jet, and 1 helicopter.

The fixed-base operator on field, Epic Aviation, offers 100LL Avgas and Jet-A fuel and pilot amenities. Epic Flight Academy is a flight school offering a full range of flight training in response to the pilot shortage and aircraft mechanic training. Airgate Aviation is a full service fixed-base operator, with Hertz rental cars on site. Airgate operates Island Hopperz restaurant, which is open daily, from 8:00 am until 6:00 pm. Airgate offers single point and overawing Jet-A fuel as well as 100LL Avgas.

== Accidents and incidents ==
On August 1, 1980, a Douglas R4D, civilian registration number N45864, crashed at New Smyrna Beach, Florida shortly after take-off on a ferry flight to Queen Beatrix International Airport, Aruba. The unqualified pilot had been drinking.

== See also ==
- List of airports in Florida
