= Camp Guernsey Airport =

Airport in Guernsey, Wyoming

- IATA: GUR; ICAO: KGUR; FAA LID: GUR

Summary
- Owner: Wyoming Military Department
- Serves: Guernsey, Wyoming
- Location: Guernsey, Wyoming
- Elevation AMSL: 4,402 ft / 1,341.73 m
- Coordinates: 42°15′45″N 104°43′55″W

Map
- Location of airport in Wyoming GUR (the United States)

Runways
Direction	Length		Surface
Direction	ft	m	Surface
14/32	5,059	1,452	Asphalt

Camp Guernsey Airport, also known as Guernsey Municipal Airport or Guernsey Army Airfield (IATA: GUR, ICAO: KGUR, FAA LID: GUR) is an airport established in 1939 and located one mile southeast of Guernsey, Wyoming. Surrounding the facility is a 78,000 acre training center for the Wyoming Military Department.
