= Daytona Beach International Airport =

Airport within Daytona Beach city limits

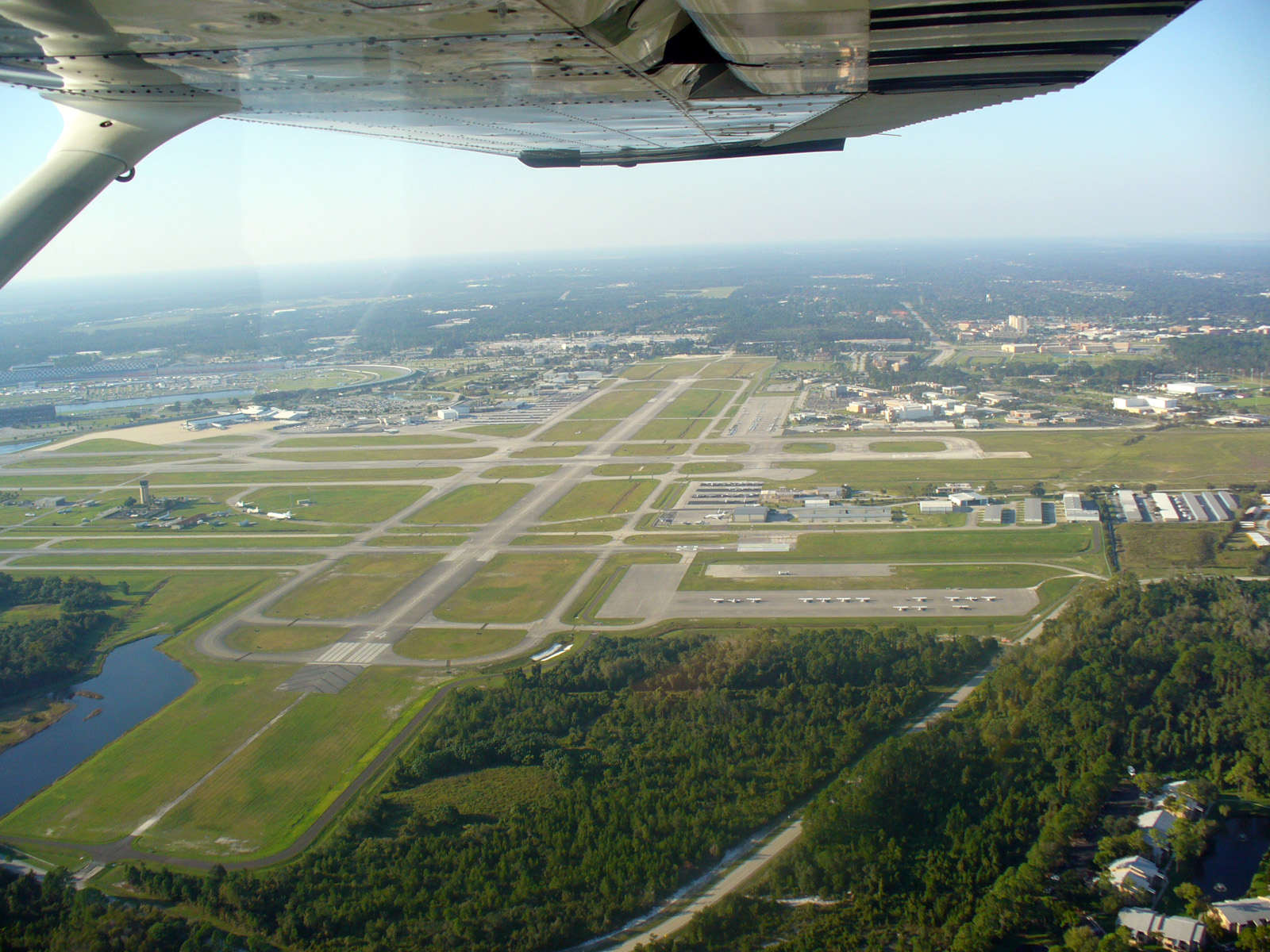
- Aerial view of runway 34, November 3, 2007. The speedway can be seen on the left.
- IATA: DAB; ICAO: KDAB; FAA LID: DAB; WMO: 74787

Summary
- Airport type: Public
- Owner: County of Volusia
- Serves: Daytona Beach, Florida
- Location: Within Daytona Beach city limits
- Elevation AMSL: 33 ft (10 m)
- Coordinates: 29°11′05″N 81°03′38″W
- Website: www.flydaytonafirst.com

Maps
- FAA airport diagram
- Interactive map of Daytona Beach International Airport

Runways
Direction	Length		Surface
Direction	ft	m	Surface
07L/25R	10,500	3,200	Asphalt/concrete
07R/25L	3,195	974	Asphalt
16/34	6,001	1,829	Asphalt

Statistics (2025)
- Aircraft operations: 332,044
- Based aircraft (2021): 238
- Total passengers: 772,000
- Source: Federal Aviation Administration

Daytona Beach International Airport (IATA: DAB, ICAO: KDAB, FAA LID: DAB) is a county-owned airport located three miles (5 km) southwest of Daytona Beach, next to Daytona International Speedway, in Volusia County, Florida, United States. The airport has 3 runways, a six-gate domestic terminal, and an international terminal. Daytona Beach is the headquarters of Embry-Riddle Aeronautical University.

== History ==
=== The Beach ===
Daytona Beach’s beach was known for having a smooth, hard, and relatively clean surface for motor vehicles, which would frequently race on it. Pilots soon realized the effectiveness of the compact sand and began using the beach as a runway. Hangars were built later, and aircraft service was provided on the beach. This former airport is one of only two beach airports that were successful. The other, Old Orchard Beach in Maine, was the starting point for at least five transatlantic flights during the 1920s and 1930s. The first flight on the beach was in 1906 by Charles K. Hamilton, using Israel Ludlow's glider. The glider was pulled by an automobile and actually took place in Ormond. He went as high as 150 feet (46 m) on his first attempt, and 250 feet (76 m) on the second, before crashing into a flagpole and surviving with a bruised knee.

Numerous flights followed, including John Alexander Douglas McCurdy, the United States's fifth licensed pilot, in 1911; Phillips Page in 1912; and Ruth Law in 1913. Phillips Page has been credited for taking the first aerial photographs in Florida while flying around the Hotel Clarendon in Daytona Beach. Many other pilots took to the skies above Daytona Beach before it was closed during the winter of 1929–30.

=== Bethune Point ===
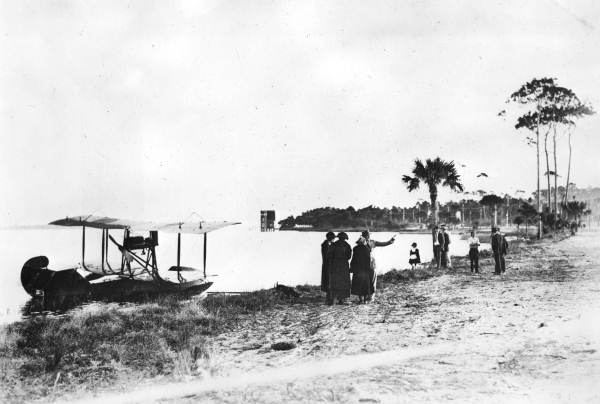
1916 photo of a seaplane at Daytona

All flights were moved to the new location at Bethune Point on the Halifax River. Eastern Air Transport was the first airline at Daytona Beach, certified to fly mail to Tampa and Orlando. The first flight crashed just after takeoff, due to a mechanical failure. The pilot was uninjured, and the mail was collected and sent out on another flight.

Florida State Airways, Inc was formed in early 1930 in Daytona Beach. The airline carried passengers to other Florida cities and to the Bahamas on Ryan aircraft. In January 1930, Vice President of Operations Bill Lindley piloted a flight to Palm Beach. While on the descent, he never pulled out of the dive and went into Lake Worth at full throttle. The combination of Lindley's death and the depression soon ended most aviation activity in Daytona Beach.

=== Municipal Airport ===
In late 1930, a 740-acre (299 ha) piece of land turned into the current airport, a few hundred feet from the main drag of Volusia Avenue (now International Speedway Blvd). The first name it was given was Sholtz Field, after David Sholtz, the then-governor of Florida, who was from Daytona Beach. The airport began with two gravel runways, one 2,100 feet (640 m) long and the other 1,800 feet (550 m). Before long the name became Daytona Beach Municipal Airport.

Eastern Air Lines began passenger service, flying Kingbirds and Condors. After a few years Eastern did not re-bid, after the airmail route changes of 1934. In 1935 National Airlines won a bid on the cross-state route from Daytona Beach to St. Petersburg. In 1933, the airport was closed for repairs. National rerouted its flights to Jacksonville but Eastern became upset and called National's move an act of "buccaneers". National Airlines then referred to its service as being the "Buccaneer Route".

=== Pre-war expansion ===
In the late 1930s, four 4000 feet by 150 feet (46 m) runways were built, all paved, allowing flights on Douglas DC-2s and DC-3s. The terminal was on the south side of the airport.

=== Naval Air Station Daytona Beach ===
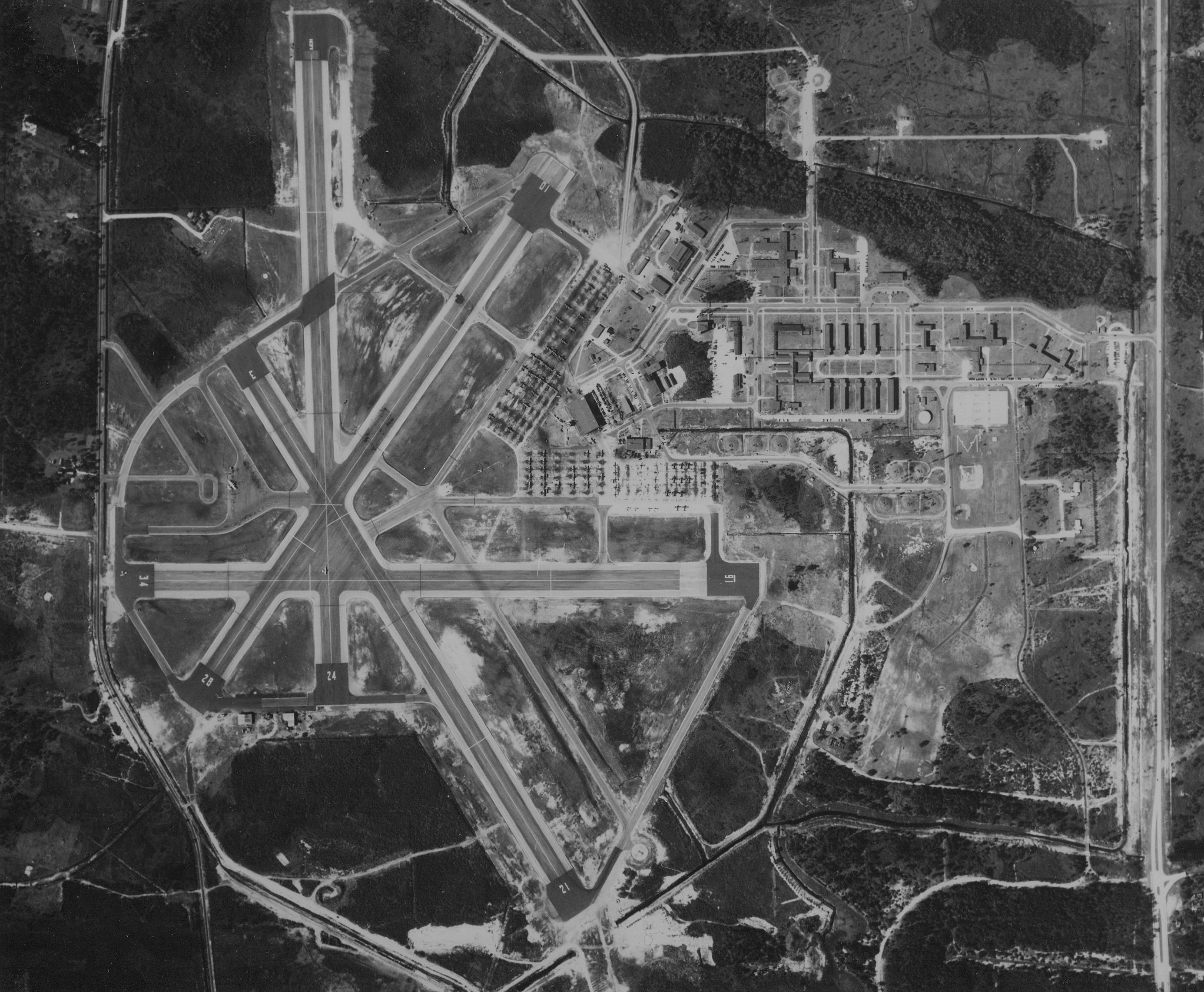
Naval Air Station Daytona Beach, October 1944

When World War II broke out, the US Navy took over and used the airport for training, calling it Naval Air Station Daytona Beach. An extensive military construction effort followed to include multiple new buildings for NAS Daytona Beach. Other Naval Outlying Fields (NOLFs) were built at Spruce Creek, New Smyrna Beach, Ormond Beach and Bunnell, and they were shared with Naval Air Station Jacksonville, Naval Air Station Sanford and Naval Air Station DeLand.

Naval Air Station Daytona Beach conducted advanced training for Naval Aviators and enlisted Naval Aircrewmen of the US Navy and US Marine Corps in aircraft ranging from carrier-based single seat F6F Hellcat and F4U Corsair fighters to the multi-seat SB2C Helldiver dive bomber. At the end of the war, NAS Daytona Beach was decommissioned and the auxiliary airfields were returned to the respective local governments for civil use as airports.

Many of the buildings constructed by the Navy were later used by Embry-Riddle Aeronautical University after the university's move from Miami in 1965, while others were used by the city aviation department that later became the current aviation authority.

=== Post-war expansion ===
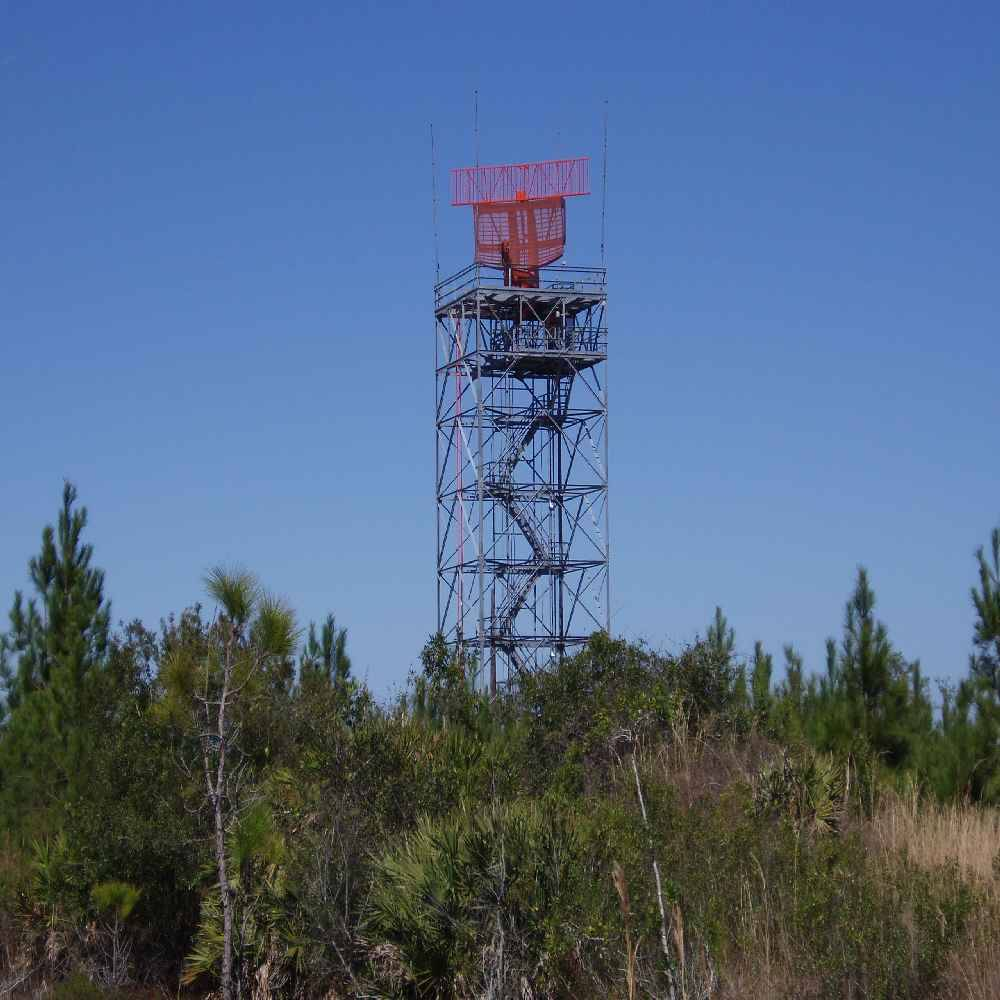
The Daytona Beach Airport Surveillance Radar, located off-site

The April 1957 OAG lists eight departures a day on Eastern Airlines and four on National Airlines. A new passenger terminal was completed on the north side of the airport in 1958, along with a control tower. Jet flights began in December 1967 with Eastern operating Boeing 727s on a round trip routing of Miami (MIA) - Melbourne (MLB) - Daytona Beach (DAB) - Baltimore (BAL) - New York Kennedy (JFK). Also in 1967, National was serving the airport with Lockheed L-188 Electra turboprops with nonstop flights to Jacksonville and Orlando as well as direct, no change of plane service to Boston, New York City, Newark, Philadelphia, Norfolk, Charleston, Savannah, Miami, Tampa and West Palm Beach. The 1968 AOPA Directory lists DAB's longest runway as being 5700 ft; however, this information may have not been up to date as the 1969 Directory lists a 7500 ft runway. Runways 6 and 16 were 150' wide, the two diagonal runways were closed, and a 3100' x 75' training runway had been constructed parallel to the main runway on the south side of the field. By 1969, National was operating Boeing 727 jet service from the airport with nonstop flights to Miami and Jacksonville as well as direct service to Washington D.C. National Airport and New York JFK Airport.

Also in 1969, Volusia County took over management of the airport from the City of Daytona Beach and renamed it Daytona Beach Regional Airport. In the following decades, Embry-Riddle expanded its campus on the northeast side of the field.

According to the February 1, 1976 edition of the Official Airline Guide (OAG), Eastern Airlines was operating flights from the airport with Lockheed L-1011 Tristar wide body jetliners on a routing of Daytona Beach - Atlanta - Omaha - Portland, OR - Seattle. There were also Boeing 727-100, 727-200 and McDonnell Douglas DC-9-30 jets with nonstop flights from Atlanta, Charlotte, Jacksonville, Miami and New York's LaGuardia Airport as well as direct one stop or two stop flights from Boston, Chicago, Cleveland, Los Angeles, Montreal, New York's JFK Airport, Newark Airport, Raleigh–Durham, and Washington D.C. National Airport (now Reagan Airport). This same OAG also lists flights operated by National Airlines with Boeing 727-100 and 727-200 jetliners nonstop from Jacksonville, Miami and Orlando with direct one stop service from New York, Newark and Tampa.

By the mid-1980s, a midfield control tower had been completed and the airport was being served by Eastern, Delta Air Lines and Continental Airlines.

During the 1980s and 1990s when American Airlines was operating a hub in Raleigh–Durham, the carrier flew several daily flights to Raleigh–Durham International Airport. American ended service to Daytona Beach in 1994 as its Raleigh–Durham hub was shut down but then returned to the airport following its merger with US Airways in 2015.

In 1992, a larger two-level terminal opened, and the previous terminal was converted to an international arrivals facility. These new buildings, along with extension of two runways to 10,500' and 6001', justified a name change to Daytona Beach International Airport.

According to the September 15, 1994 edition of the OAG, three airlines were operating mainline jet service into the airport: Delta, Continental, and USAir. Delta was flying seven nonstop flights a day to Atlanta with Boeing 737-200 and McDonnell Douglas MD-80 jetliners, Continental was operating one daily nonstop to Newark Airport with an MD-80 jet and USAir was flying daily nonstops to Charlotte three times a day with Boeing 737-300 and 737-400 jetliners. USAir was renamed "US Airways" and then merged into American Airlines in 2015. There were also commuter propjet flights at this time from the airport nonstop to Miami flown by Gulfstream International Airlines with Beechcraft 1900 turboprops as well as nonstop service to Orlando operated by Delta Connection and USAir Express with Beechcraft 1900, Embraer EMB-120 Brasilia and Fairchild Swearingen Metroliner turboprops.

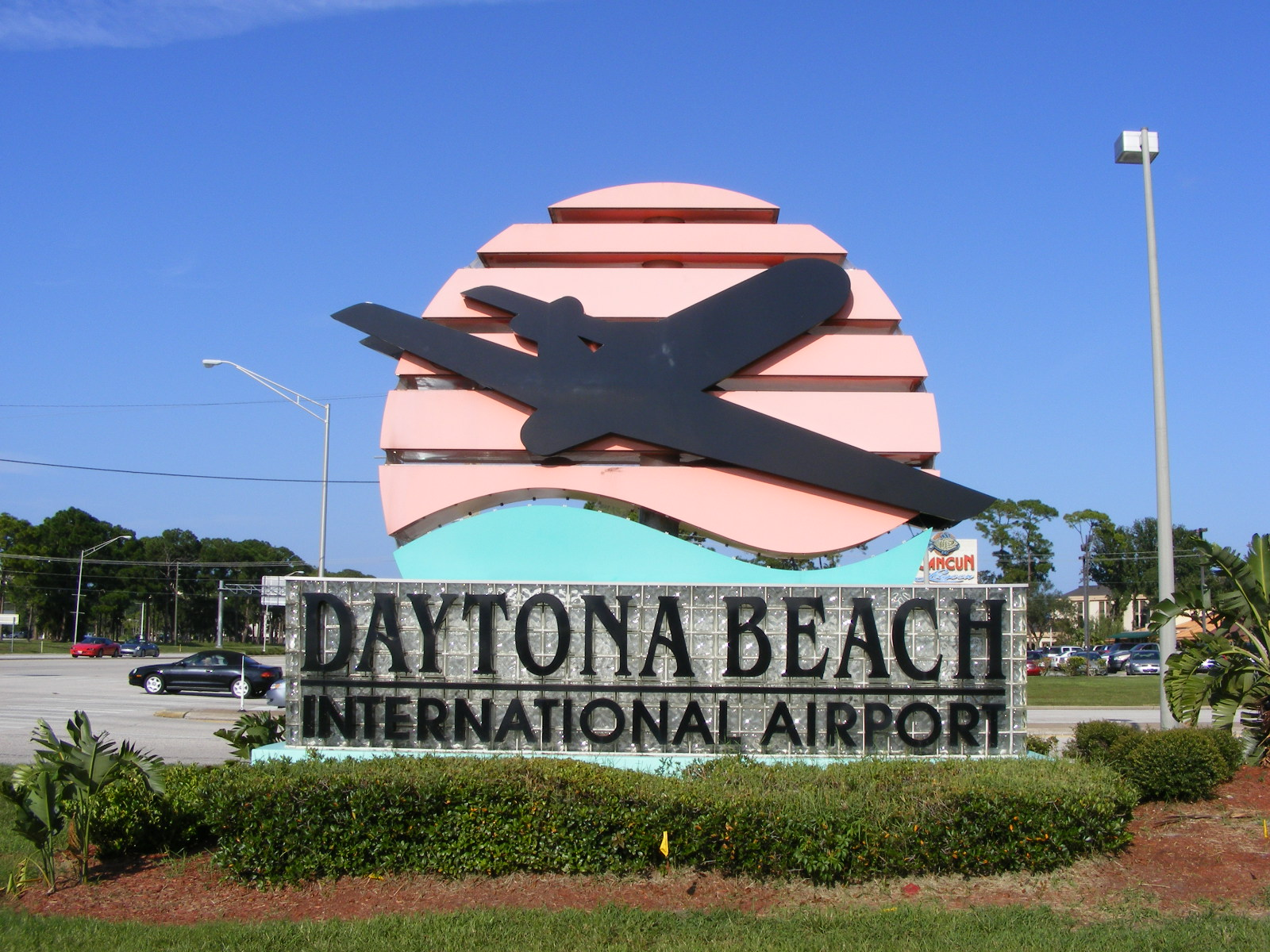
Entrance sign

In November 1995, German air carrier LTU International began service to Düsseldorf. The flight was discontinued in October 1997. The only other scheduled direct flights out of the country from the airport were later operated to the Bahamas with small Beechcraft twin turboprops flown by Vintage Props and Jets, a commuter airline. On July 18, 2008 Vintage Props and Jets temporarily ceased operations and filed for Chapter 11 bankruptcy protection. International charters with wide body jetliners flown by several airlines are occasionally operated into the airport.

According to an article in the Daytona Beach News-Journal released on September 28, 2010, Stephen J. Cooke, the director of the airport, was in talks with the recently merged Southwest/AirTran to begin service to Daytona. AirTran had served Daytona in the past competing with Delta on the Atlanta route and also operated routes to Baltimore and New York LaGuardia Airport as well. Southwest has never served Daytona. A Southwest spokesman stated at the time that it was too soon to discuss possible new service to DAB but talks were continuing. If Southwest were to serve Daytona it would likely be from numerous cities. This would increase competition and lower prices for an airport that had been a duopoly by Delta and US Airways for years. US Airways subsequently merged with American and Southwest still does not serve Daytona Beach at the present time. JetBlue began flying new nonstop service to New York John F. Kennedy International Airport on January 7, 2016, however, this operation ceased on January 7, 2019, three years to the date of their inaugural flight in 2016.

On January 17, 2019, Silver Airways began nonstop daily service to Fort Lauderdale Airport with SAAB 340. The route was made possible in part from taxpayer-funded incentives from the Volusia County government. These flights ended on July 1, 2019, due to a fare level that is financially sustainable to continue in current market conditions.

Canadian airline Sunwing Airlines flew between Toronto and Daytona Beach in 2019, but it no longer does. The route had been made possible in part from taxpayer-funded incentives from the Volusia County government.

== Facilities ==
Daytona Beach International Airport covers 1,800 acres (730 ha) and has three asphalt runways: 07L/25R, 10,500 ft × 150 ft (3,200 m × 46 m), 07R/25L, 3,195 ft × 100 ft (974 m × 30 m) and 16/34, 6,001 x 150 ft. (1,829 x 46 m).

In the year ending September 30, 2021 the airport had 364,071 aircraft operations, an average of 997 per day: 62% general aviation, 36% air taxi, 2% airline and <1% military. At that time, there were 238 aircraft based at this airport: 167 single-engine, 40 multi-engine, 29 jet and 2 helicopter.

=== Fixed-base operators ===
- ATP Jet Center
- SheltAir Aviation Services
- Yelvington Jet Aviation

=== Aviation schools ===
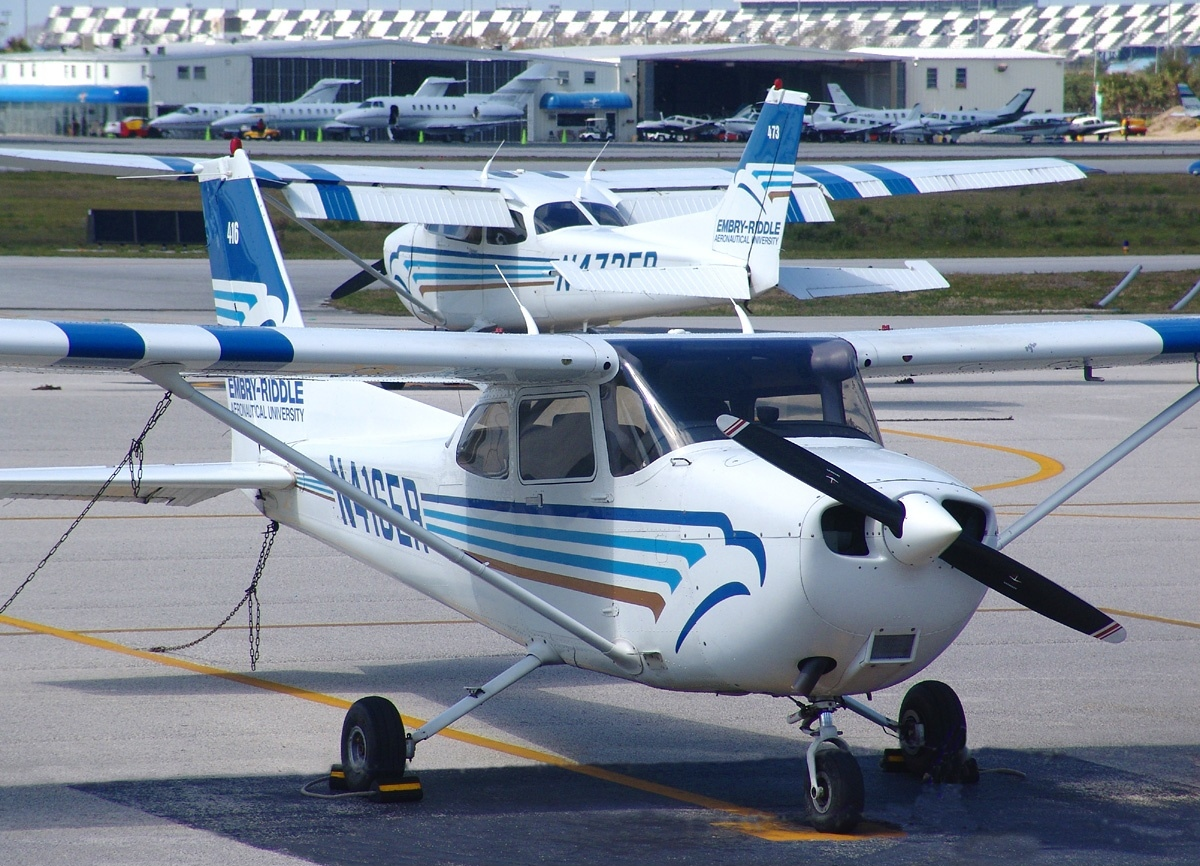
Embry Riddle Cessna fleet

- Air America Flight Center
- ATP Flight School
- Echo Bravo Flight Training
- Daytona Aviation Academy
- Dickinson Aviation
- Embry-Riddle Aeronautical University
- Phoenix East Aviation
- Spectrum Flying Club
- TFA Flight Academy
- The Airline Academy

== Airlines and destinations ==
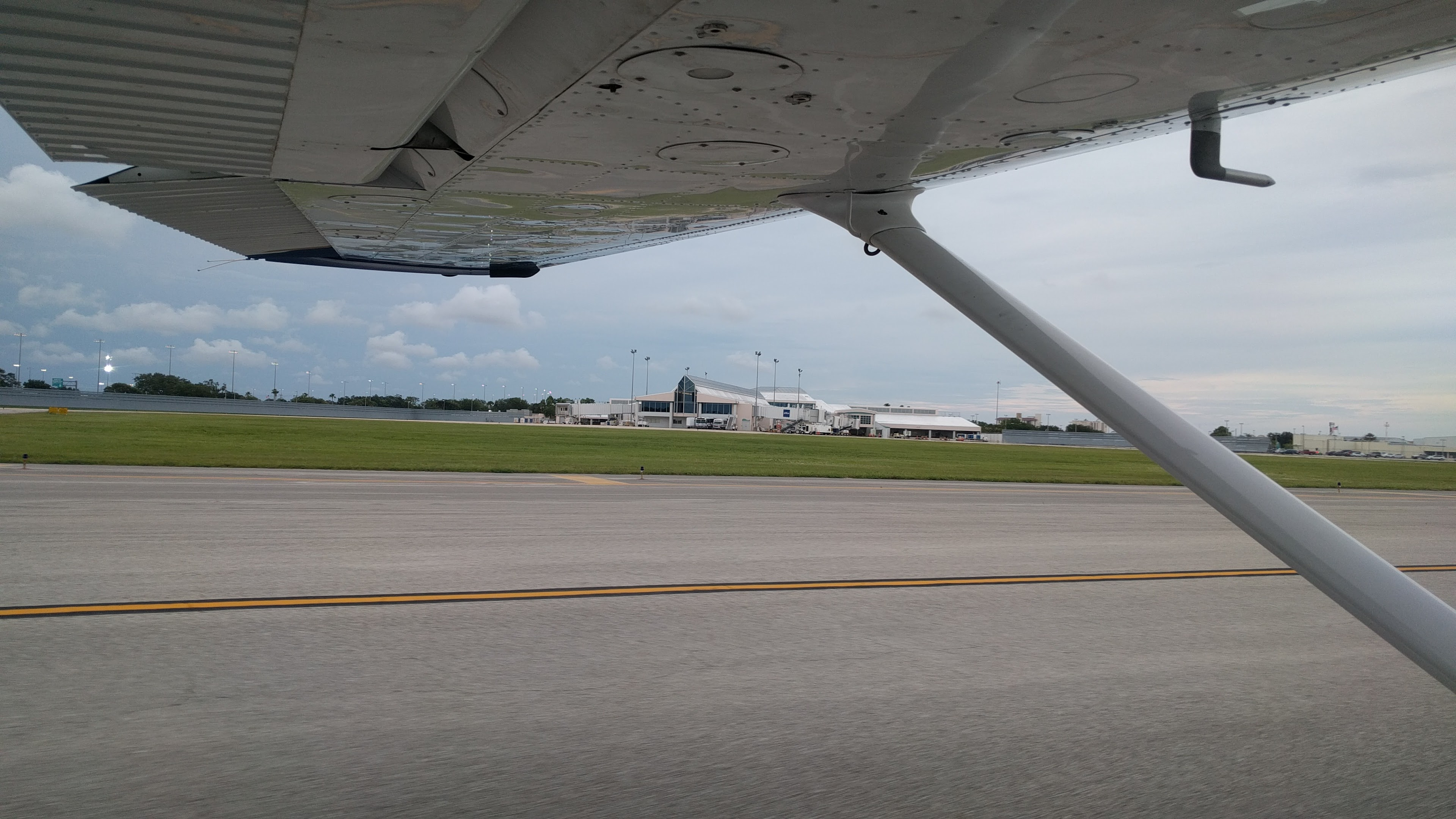
Daytona Beach International Airport terminal as seen from a Cessna 172

=== Passenger ===
Airlines	Destinations
American Airlines	Seasonal: Charlotte
American Eagle	Charlotte
Avelo Airlines	New Haven; Seasonal: Wilmington (DE)
Breeze Airways	Hartford, Providence, Raleigh/Durham; Seasonal: Akron/Canton
Delta Air Lines	Atlanta

== Statistics ==
Busiest domestic routes from DAB (August 2025 – July 2026)
Rank	City	Passengers	Carriers
1	Atlanta, Georgia	201,670	Delta
2	Charlotte, North Carolina	93,670	American
3	New York–JFK, New York	25,590	JetBlue
4	Boston, Massachusetts	24,730	JetBlue
5	New Haven, Connecticut	16,100	Avelo
6	Providence, Rhode Island	11,030	Breeze
7	Wilmington, Delaware	10,930	Avelo
8	Hartford, Connecticut	9,320	Breeze
9	Raleigh/Durham, North Carolina	7,660	Breeze
10	White Plains, New York	6,600	Breeze

Largest Airlines at DAB (August 2025 – July 2026)
Rank	Carrier	Passengers	Percentage
1	Delta Air Lines	401,000	48.51%
2	PSA Airlines	137,000	16.56%
3	JetBlue	104,000	12.54%
4	Breeze Airways	78,610	9.52%
5	Avelo Airlines	53,900	6.52%
—	Other	52,370	6.34%

Annual passenger traffic at DAB (2016 – Present)
Year	Passengers
2016	676,000
2017	684,000
2018	726,000
2019	670,000
2020	320,000
2021	543,000
2022	554,000
2023	687,000
2024	665,000
2025	772,000

== Accidents and incidents ==
- On August 10, 1937, an Eastern Airlines DC-2 crashed after striking a pylon during an evening takeoff at then Daytona Beach Municipal Airport bound for Miami-36th Street Airport. Two crew and two passengers out of the nine on board were killed.
- On June 20, 2001, a Bell 206 helicopter operating for the Volusia County Sheriff's Department sustained a hard landing and rollover while attempting a practice autorotation to a landing at Daytona Beach International Airport. The probable cause of the accident was found to be the failure of the pilot to maintain directional control following a hard landing resulting from a failure to maintain rotor rpm.
- On April 4, 2018, a Piper PA-28 airplane crashed in a field just west of Daytona International Airport shortly after taking off. The plane was operated by Embry-Riddle Aeronautical University and was being flown by a student pilot and an FAA Check Instructor during the student's Commercial Pilot Checkride. Both occupants were killed and witnesses told police they saw the Piper PA-28's wing fall off before it crashed. As a result, Embry-Riddle discontinued flying the airplane.
- On June 9, 2018, a Piper PA-44 Seminole crashed while on an instrument approach to the Daytona Beach International Airport. The probable cause of the accident was found to be the pilots' improper in-flight weather evaluation and decision to continue the approach, which resulted in an encounter with a thunderstorm, a loss of airplane control, and collision with terrain.

== See also ==
- List of airports in Florida
