= DeLand Municipal Airport =

Airport in DeLand, Florida, United States

DeLand Municipal Airport Sidney H. Taylor Field
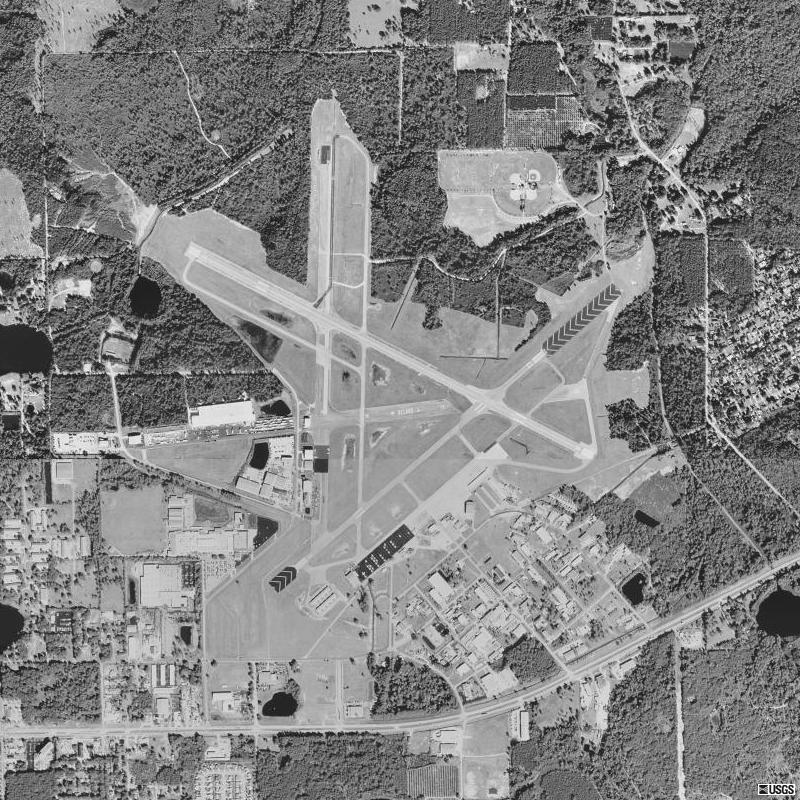
- USGS 1999 orthophoto
- IATA: QLD; ICAO: KDED; FAA LID: DED

Summary
- Airport type: Public
- Owner: City of DeLand
- Serves: DeLand, Florida, U.S.
- Elevation AMSL: 79 ft (24 m)
- Coordinates: 29°04′01″N 081°17′02″W
- Website: www.deland.org/airport/

Map
- Location of airport in Florida DED (the United States)

Runways
Direction	Length		Surface
Direction	ft	m	Surface
12/30	6,000	1,829	Asphalt
5/23	4,300	1,311	Asphalt

Statistics (2002)
- Aircraft operations: 77,710
- Based aircraft: 162
- Source: Federal Aviation Administration

DeLand Municipal Airport (ICAO: KDED, FAA LID: DED), also known as Sidney H. Taylor Field, is a city-owned public-use airport located three nautical miles (5 km) northeast of the central business district of DeLand, a city in Volusia County, Florida, United States.

Although many U.S. airports use the same three-letter location identifier for the Federal Aviation Administration and IATA, this airport is assigned DED by the FAA but no designation from the IATA (which assigned DED to Jolly Grant Airport in Dehradun, India).

== History ==
=== Military use ===
The city first began developing the airport in the 1920s, with the first asphalt runway laid around 1936. In 1942, the City of DeLand donated the facility to the U.S. Navy. It was renamed Naval Air Station DeLand on November 17, 1942.

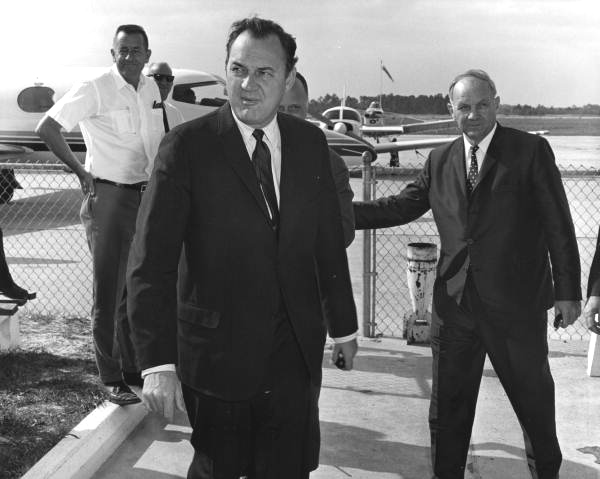
Governor Claude Kirk visited DeLand Airport in March 1967.

Following extensive military construction, NAS DeLand's primary focus was advanced training for Navy flight crews in land-based PBO Ventura and PB4Y-2 Privateer patrol bombers, and carrier-based SBD Dauntless dive bombers. Several of the U.S. Navy's former and present day maritime patrol and reconnaissance (VP) squadrons operating the P-3 Orion trace their squadron lineage to being initially established at NAS DeLand during World War II.

In 1944, training in the carrier-based F6F Hellcat fighter was added to NAS DeLand's mission.

Nine Mile Point on Lake George was also under NAS DeLand's control, and was used as a practice bombing site with a Navy PBY Catalina seaplane stationed nearby in the event of an aircraft mishap on the lake. This Lake George site is still used today as part of the Navy's Pinecastle Electronic Warfare and Bombing Range managed by NAS Jacksonville.

NAS DeLand was decommissioned following the end of World War II, its control tower closed, and control of the airfield returned to the City of DeLand. Numerous former military buildings remain standing as part of the airport's industrial park and the Naval Air Station DeLand Museum.

=== Current use ===
Today, the airport serves as an non towered general aviation reliever airport to commercial operations at Daytona Beach International Airport (DAB), Orlando Sanford International Airport (SFB) and Orlando International Airport (MCO). In 2007, an analysis was completed for the possible establishment of an FAA Level 1 air traffic control tower at DED under the FAA's Contract Tower Program.

== Facilities and aircraft ==
DeLand Municipal Airport covers an area of 1,289 acres (522 ha) which contains two asphalt paved runways: 12/30 measuring 6,000 x 100 ft (1,829 x 30 m) and 5/23: 4,300 x 75 ft (1,311 x 23 m).

For the 12-month period ending May 7, 2002, the airport had 77,710 aircraft operations, an average of 212 per day: 99% general aviation, 1% air taxi and <1% military. There are 162 aircraft based at this airport: 70% single-engine, 23% multi-engine, 2% jet, 4% helicopter and 1% ultralight.

== See also ==
- List of airports in Florida
