= Mount Moriah Baptist Church =

Mount Moriah Baptist Church may refer to:

- Mount Moriah Baptist Church (Port Orange, Florida)
- Mount Moriah Baptist Church (Middlesboro, Kentucky)
- Mount Moriah Baptist Church and Cemetery, Roanoke, Virginia
- Mount Moriah Missionary Baptist Church, Winter Park, Florida
