= Dunlawton Avenue Historic District =

Historic district in Florida, United States

- U.S. National Register of Historic Places
- U.S. Historic district
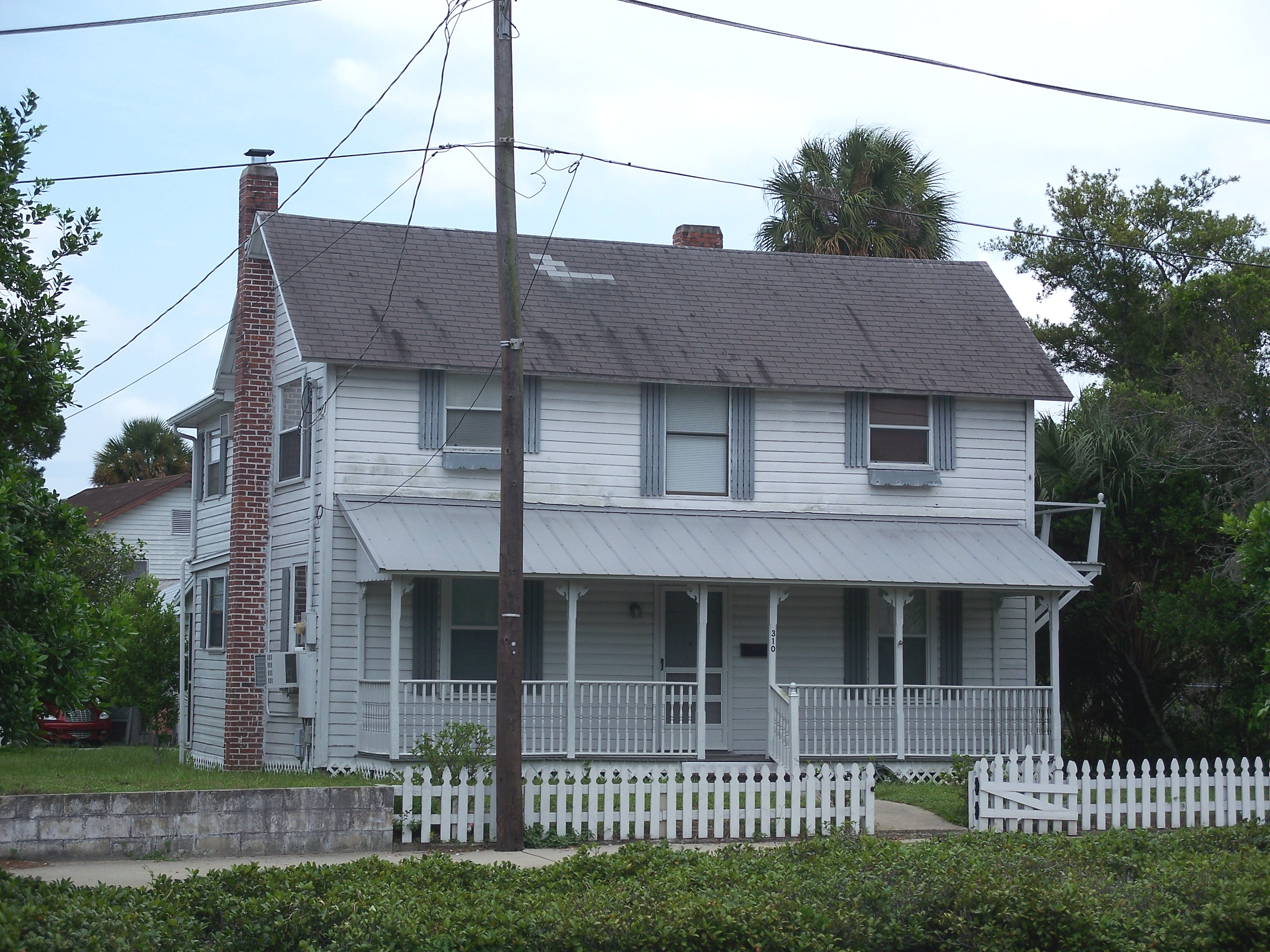
- House in the district

- Location within Volusia County
- Location: Port Orange, Florida
- Coordinates: 29°8′32″N 80°59′29″W
- Area: 60 acres (0.24 km^{2})
- NRHP reference No.: 98000055
- Added to NRHP: February 5, 1998

The Dunlawton Avenue Historic District is a U.S. historic district (designated as such on February 5, 1998) located in Port Orange, Florida. The district runs roughly along Dunlawton Avenue to Lafayette Avenue, and Orange Avenue and Wellman Street. It contains 17 historic buildings.

== Gallery ==
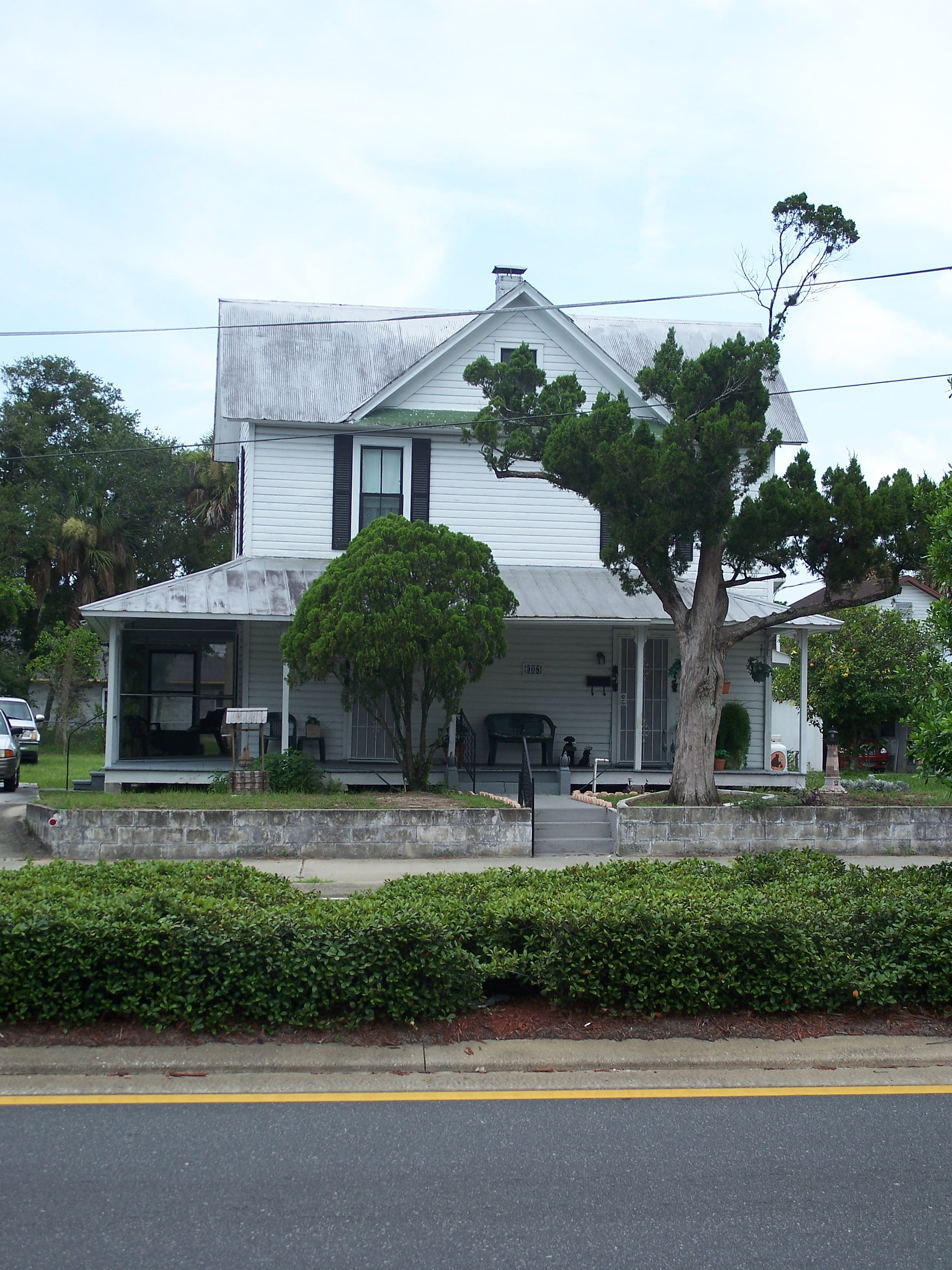

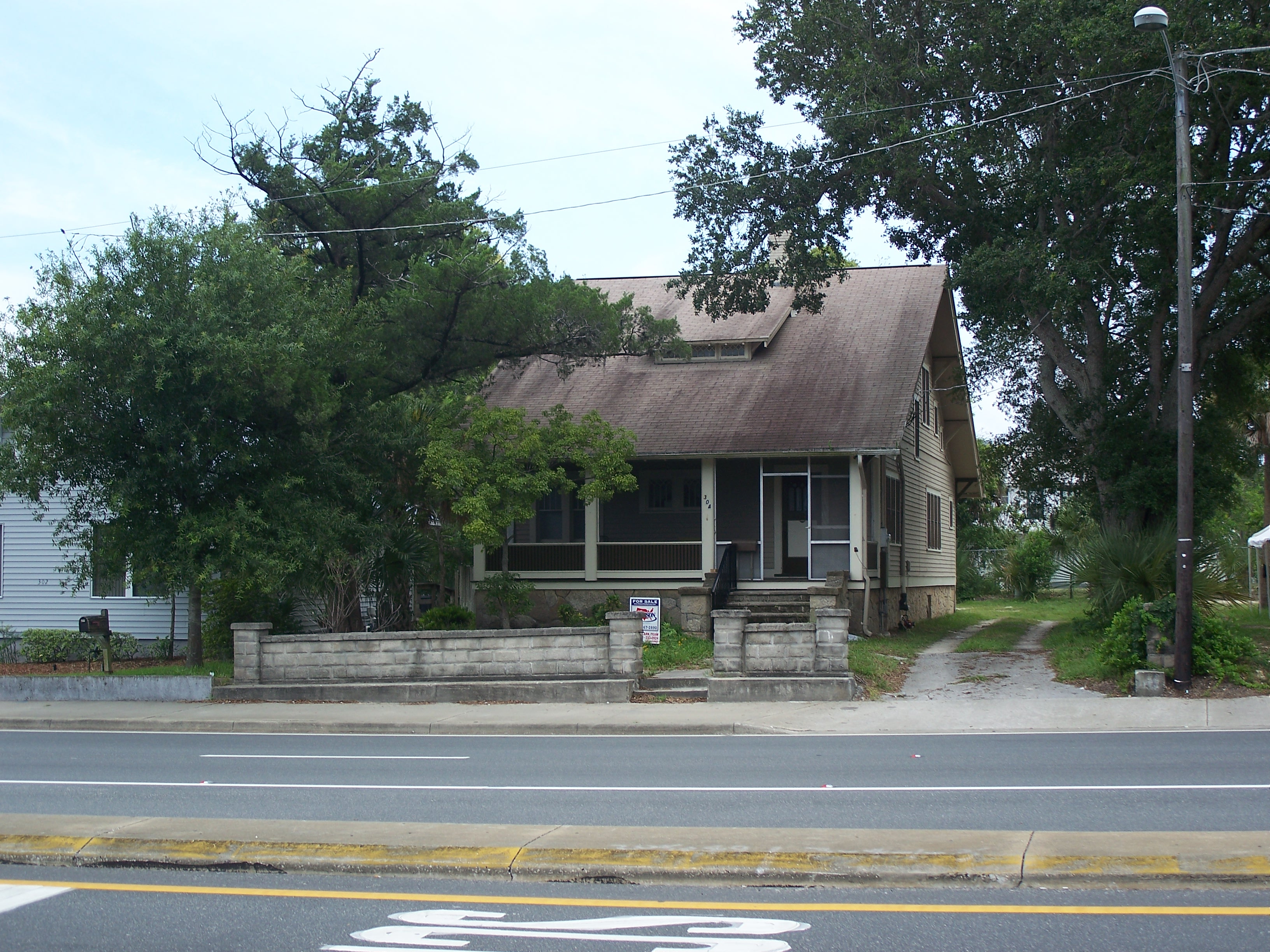

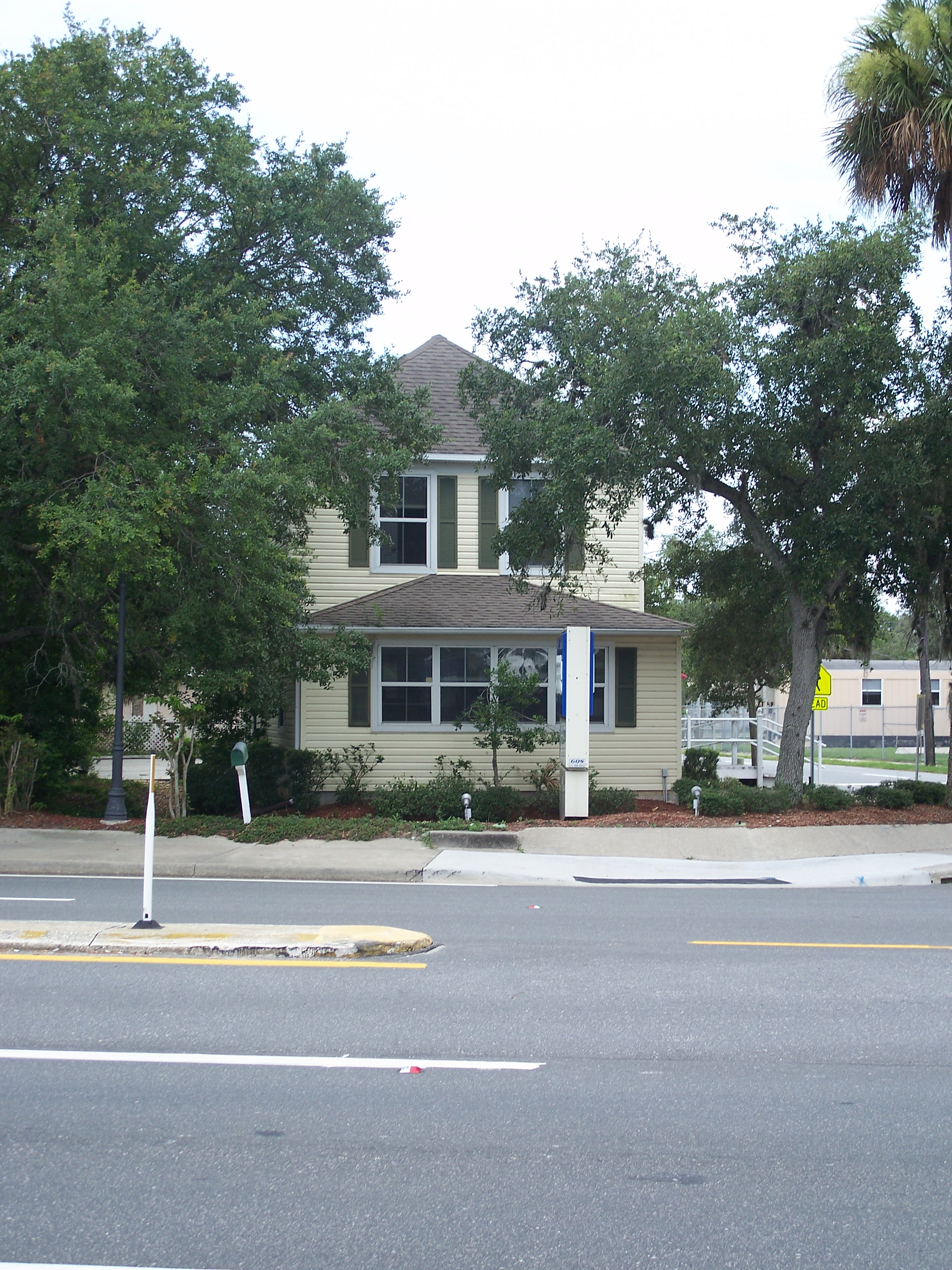
