= Mount Moriah Baptist Church (Port Orange, Florida) =

Church building in Florida, United States

Coordinates: 29.1483°N 80.9938°W

Mount Moriah Baptist Church was built in Port Orange, Florida in 1911. Built to serve black residents, it was located in an area that came to be known as Freemanville and is believed to be the last remaining building from the settlement. Freed blacks settled the area to work at a lumber company started by John Milton Hawks, but sandy soil, corruption, and planning issues led to a rapid decline as the colony struggled. A plaque commemorate the area's history. It is part of the Florida Black Heritage Trail. It has been suggested that Esther Hawks established Florida's first integrated school in the area. An annual Freeman Day Ceremony commemorates the heritage. The church was renovated in 1956.
