= Fort Myers Senior High School =

Public school in Fort Myers, Florida, United States

Fort Myers High School

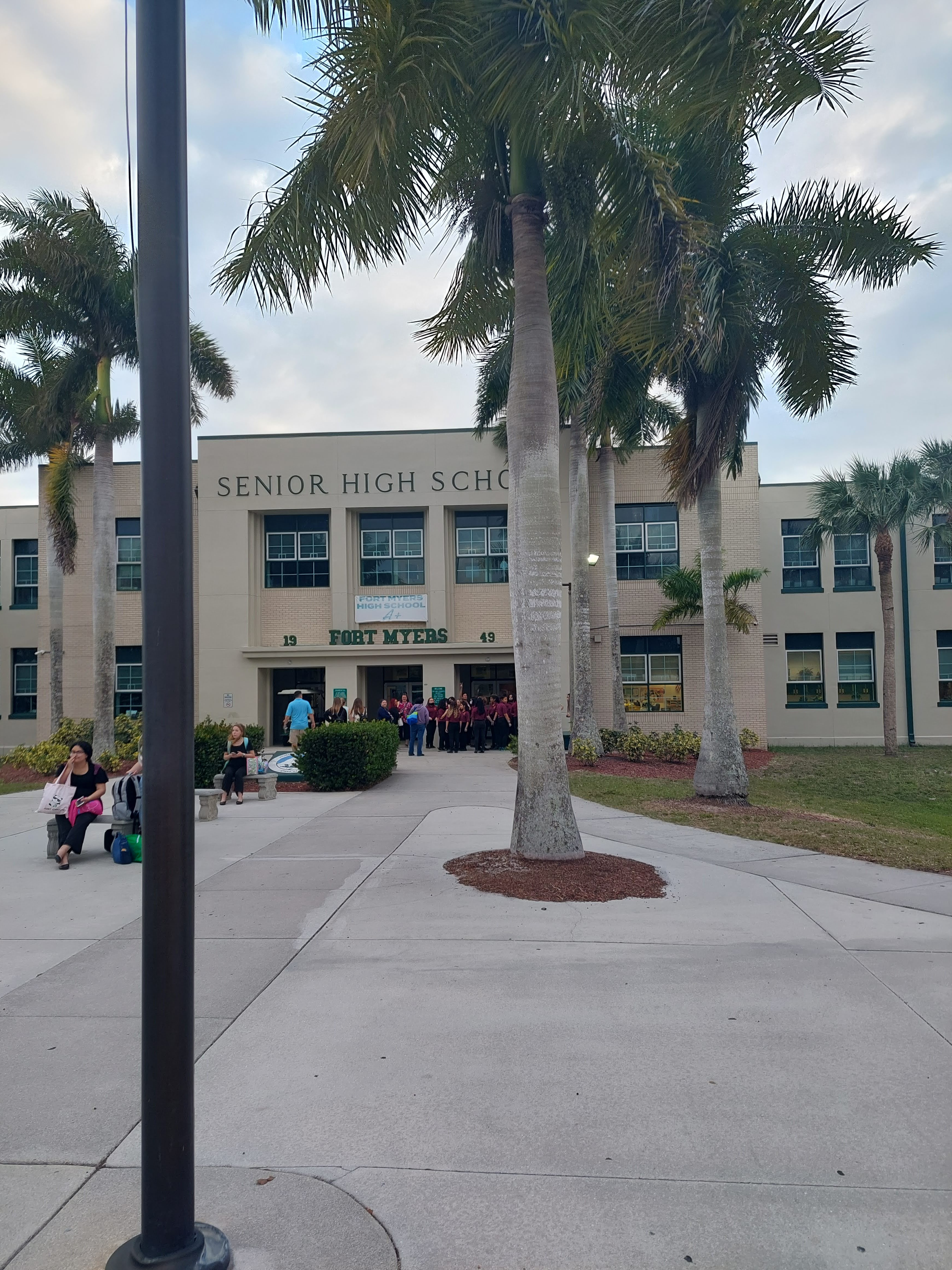

Location
- 2635 Cortez Blvd; Fort Myers, Florida 33901; United States; 26.628149°N 81.877577°W

Information
- Type: Public Secondary School
- Established: October 19, 1911
- School district: Lee County School District
- Principal: Christian Engelhart
- Teaching staff: 78.80 (on an FTE basis)
- Grades: 9-12
- Enrollment: 1,835 (2024–2025)
- Student to teacher ratio: 23.29
- Color
- Mascot: Tsunami Sam
- Nickname: Green Wave
- Website: fmh.leeschools.net

Fort Myers Senior High School (also known as "FMHS") is a public school in Fort Myers, Florida. It was opened on October 19, 1911, making it one of the oldest schools in the state of Florida, and the oldest in Lee County. It is managed by the Lee County School District. The enrollment as of May 2026 is 1,850 students.

Fort Myers Senior High School offers the International Baccalaureate program, Advanced Placement, Dual Enrollment, Vocational, Honors, and general education classes. Another asset of FMHS, which is most notable in some academic circles, FMHS is the only high school in Lee county which caters explicitly to the deaf and blind student populations. In addition to the educational programs, the school has thirty FHSAA athletic teams for young men and women. FMHS is rich in traditions and has a very active Alumni.

== School history ==
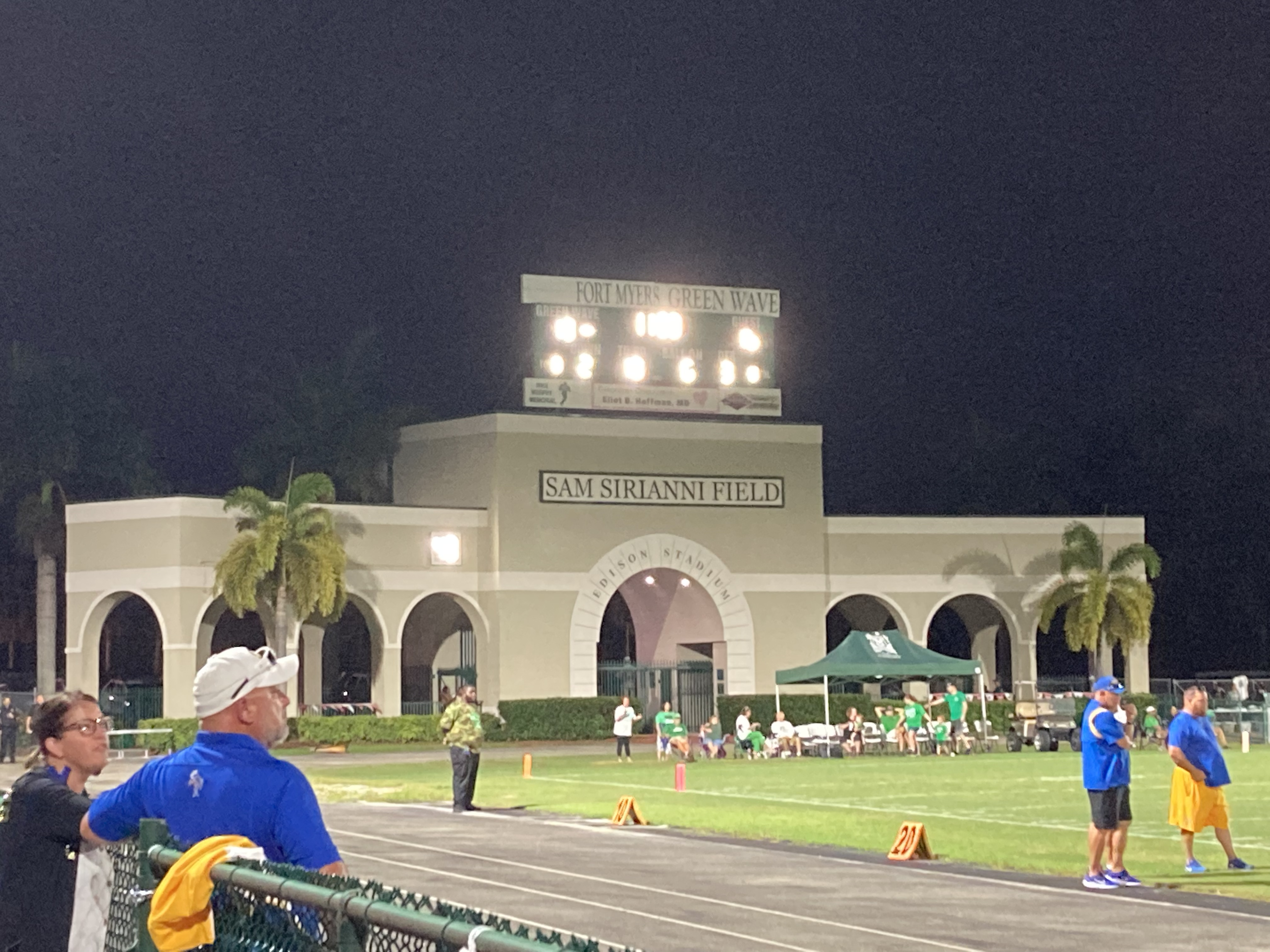
The Sam Sirianni Field football stadium

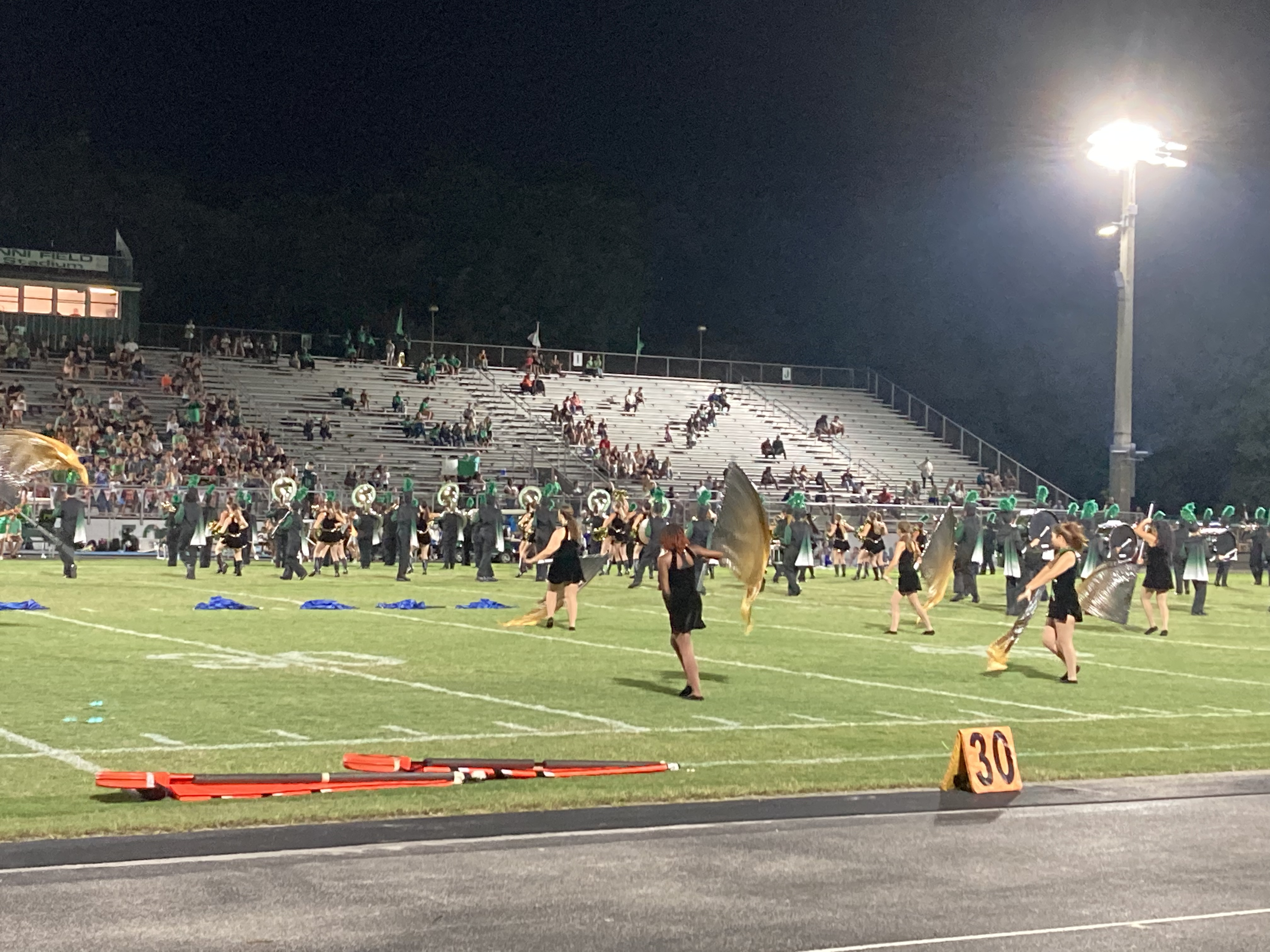
The Green Wave band and color guard performing during half time at a varsity football home game

=== Early history in Fort Myers ===
Between 1887 and 1910, high school-aged students in Fort Myers attended classes in a loose configuration of buildings that were neither adequate nor fully accredited. In 1887, Myers School was built and in 1902 a two-story wooden addition was added. As early as 1900, references were made to Myers School as Fort Myers High School, and in 1902 the school was dignified by being called the Lee County High School. The school was a disgrace to the community and severely overcrowded as enrollment passed 300 in 1908. Additional classroom space was made at the Holiness Church on Second Street and the County Commissioners also made room for classes in the county barn.

Colonel Andrew D. Gwynne, a wealthy cotton broker and wholesale grocer from Memphis, Tennessee, was a winter visitor to Fort Myers. He was appalled at children attending school in the county barn. He told his wife that if Fort Myers ever launched a campaign for a new school facility he would gladly donate to take care of part of the expense. Colonel Gwynne died in Memphis on July 20, 1909, but his widow, Andrea, and son, Captain William F. Gwynne, remembered his pledged donation.

The citizens of Fort Myers were concerned about their children’s education and saw that a need existed to create a new school. During the summer of 1909, parents pleaded with the school board to provide a modern building. The board members admitted that the current situation embarrassed the community and did not serve its purpose nor meet the children’s needs. However, they insisted they did not have enough money to build the type of school Fort Myers needed but promised to do what they could.

At that point, Mrs. Andrea D. Gwynne and her son pledged to match any sum raised by the town. With that incentive, the townspeople started a subscription list in 1910. Carl F. Roberts, a well-known citizen, headed this whirlwind campaign and in two months raised $8,000. The Gwynnes then pledged an equal amount. An additional $10,000 was obtained from a special bond issue. The school board kept their promise and provided enough funds to pay for the building which, with equipment, cost $45,000. Of all the private citizens, none deserves more honorable mention than the Gwynne family.

=== Andrew D. Gwynne Institute and growth ===
On October 19, 1911, the Andrew D. Gwynne Institute opened its doors as a fully accredited, state-of-the-art school that the entire community was extremely proud of. It housed 10 rooms, a principal’s office, a library, a spacious 500-seat auditorium, four restrooms, water fountains, and heat by radiation. Its enrollment in the first year was 285 students, grades K through 12.

Although Colonel Gwynne did not live to see the opening day, no one was more interested in the betterment of educational conditions in Fort Myers than the Colonel. It was his oft-expressed wish before his death that the children should be better provided for in educational matters. As a fitting testimonial of the love that his fellow townspeople felt for him and for the interest that he showed in them, the first official high school in Fort Myers bore his name.

Romero M. Sealey was the principal for the three years it operated as the high school, from October 1911 through May 1914. But soon growth caught up with the Gwynne Institute and a new building was needed to house the high school students. Today, the Andrew D. Gwynne Institute still stands at the corner of Second and Jackson Streets and is used as an annex by the School Board of Lee County.

By 1914, growth demanded that more facilities be created to properly educate Fort Myers high school students. At a cost of $40,000, supported by a bond, the Gwynne High School opened its doors in October of 1914. The building faced Second Street on the corner of Royal Palm. It was slightly smaller than the Gwynne Institute but was still very impressive. It was three stories tall and made of red brick. Over the entrance, “Gwynne High School” was carved onto a large concrete stone. The first floor housed the principal’s office and four large laboratories with room-to-room telephone service. The second floor had seven large classrooms, a library, and two rooms equipped to show movies. The building was equipped with electric bells and fire alarms. The lower level had showers, restrooms, a cloakroom, and a boiler room. It was another facility that the community took great pride in. At that time, the Gwynne Institute became the elementary school while Gwynne High School accommodated grades 7 through 12. This particular building was also referred to as Fort Myers High School, Myers High, and the New High. This building served as the high school from October 1914 through May 1921.

Four men served as its principal during that span: R.M. Sealey, 1914, J.F. Farrow, 1915, C.W. Crumly, 1916-18, and H.F. Steedly, 1919-20. In the fall of 1920, a beginning and end took place. Principal H.F. Steedly welcomed back 126 students, including members of the very first football team; however, this would be the last year that Gwynne High School would house the high school. In the fall of 1921, it became a junior high with grades 7 through 9 and would remain so until 1950. In 1976 the building was torn down and today the site serves as a parking lot for the United Telephone Company.

=== Lee County High School ===
The third high school in nine years opened its doors on October 20, 1921. The new building was made of yellow brick and was constructed for $224,500. It faced Thompson Street bordered by Royal Palm, Anderson, and Fowler Streets. It was known as the Lee County High School and also referred to as Fort Myers High School. The students still affectionately called it “Gwynne High.” The community once again settled for nothing but the best and the school was acclaimed as one of the finest high school facilities in Florida. This would not be a short stay, however, as the first two high schools had been. This location served as the high school, grades 10 through 12, for 29 years, from October 1921 until May 1950.

Principal James L. Orr welcomed 160 students in 1921, which was a comfortable fit. When Principal Ray Tipton opened the school in the fall of 1949, 1,116 students squeezed into the severely overcrowded little school. It was once again time for a change.

Serving as principal at this site were: James L. Orr 1921-22, J. Colin English 1923-24, Miss Katherine Moore 1925-30, Howell Watkins 1931-32, Sidney Ellison 1933-35, Charles Whitnel 1936-37, Ellis Greene 1938-41, E.B. Henderson 1942-45, and Ray Tipton 1946-50.

In 1950 the building was sold and used as the Masonic Temple. In 1990 the building was torn down and in its place today stands the black-glassed Lee County Constitutional Complex. A part of the school's front wall with Lee County High School inscribed on it stands in front of a small park as a reminder of the past.

=== Current building ===
On Monday, September 4, 1950, Principal Ray Tipton welcomed 1,250 high school and junior high school students to their new school, Fort Myers High School. The new school was situated on 22 acres of land in Edison Park and was another state-of-the-art facility as fine as any in Florida. The community raved about the new $610,000 school located on Cortez Blvd. The school has been located at this same site ever since. The original school included the main building, auditorium, an industrial arts building, home economics building, gymnasium, and stadium. There have been numerous additions including the Edison Learning Center, the science building, the new gymnasium, the library, a new cafeteria, and the Commons Area wing.

In 1996 a $14 million renovation took place. Upon completion, Fort Myers High School expanded to 37 acres including a complete technology overhaul and upgrade.

Serving as Principal at its current site have been: Ray Tipton 1950, Maurice Coleman 1951, Damon Hutzler 1952-62, Harold Thompson 1963-73, Herbert D. Wiseman 1974-1992, Dr. James Browder 1992-1994, Joni Logan 1994-1999, Dr. James Browder 2000-2003, Richard Shafer 2003-2006, David LaRosa 2006-2018 and Dr. Robert Butz 2018 to current.

Sources: The First 100 Years: Lee County Public Schools 1887-1987 by Donald Stone and Beth Carter, The Story Of Fort Myers by Karl Grismer, and Gridiron Greenies by Bobby Sizemore

=== Racial tensions ===
The school was integrated in 1969, largely by adding students displaced by the closing of historically black Dunbar High School. Integration was accompanied by much difficulty, including a riot at the school.

The school's baseball team was brought to national attention after events during the 2023 season led to the cancellation of the remainder of the baseball season, federal discrimination lawsuits, and investigations at the local and state level. In February 2023, assistant coach Alex Carcioppolo used a racial slur in a team group chat and was subsequently fired. A Title VI investigation was conducted and later the head coach, Kyle Burchfield, was removed from his position. In response to Burchfield's departure, team coaches and players held a walkout in protest. Third base coach Robert Hinson was the first to leave, abandoning his post after 2 pitches, followed by other team coaches and players. The protest, supported by many parents, left the team's only two people of color alone on the field and led to the Florida High School Athletic Association fining and sanctioning the school.

The walkout, and subsequent cancelation of the season as a result, was widely covered by the media. After the game, parents alleged racism and prejudice at the Lee County School District board meeting. After talking with parents, Principal Robert Butz canceled the remainder of the season on April 13th. Multiple lawsuits were filed, one of which by former Major League Baseball player Michael Tucker whose son was remained on the field during the walkout. In July 2024, ESPN released a feature documentary covering the events.

== Lady Wave Basketball ==
Fort Myers Senior High School's resident women's basketball team was awarded their third consecutive state title in 2018. The same year point Guard, Destanni Henderson, was acknowledged as one of the most promising student-athletes in woman's basketball as well as playing for McDonald's All-American Team.

== Notable alumni ==
- Krissy Gear - professional runner
- Jammi German - former NFL football player.
- Charles Ghigna - poet and children's author known as "Father Goose;" graduated 1964
- Destanni Henderson - WNBA player
- Gil Kerlikowske - Director of the Office of National Drug Control Policy.
- Gary Russell Libby - art historian, curator, and former director of Museum of Arts and Sciences (Daytona Beach)
- Connie Mack IV - Florida politician
- Jenna Persons, Florida politician
- Plies (né Algernod Lanier Washington) - rap musician
- Pat Putnam - Former MLB player (Texas Rangers, Seattle Mariners, Minnesota Twins)
- Zachary Root - baseball pitcher in the Los Angeles Dodgers organization
- Elissa Steamer - professional female skateboarder
- Nick Thompson - Florida politician
