= Freemanville, Florida =

Area of Port Orange, Florida, U.S.

Coordinates: 29.1483°N 80.9938°W

Freemanville is a section of Port Orange, Florida, settled by freed blacks after the U.S. Civil War. John Milton Hawks brought freed blacks to the area to work at his sawmill, but various issues caused it to fail, leading to struggles for the colony. Despite these challenges, some colonists remained and settled the area that became known as Freemanville.

The Mount Moriah Baptist Church, constructed in 1911, is believed to be the area's last remaining remnant building. A commemorative plaque and an annual Freemanville commemoration celebrate the area's heritage. Esther Hill Hawks established what may have been Florida's first integrated school to serve the community.
