= Museum of Arts and Sciences (Daytona Beach) =

- Location within Volusia County
- Interactive fullscreen map
- Location: 352 South Nova Road; Daytona Beach, Florida
- Coordinates: 29°11′30″N 81°02′14″W
- Type: Art, Science, History
- Director: Tabitha Schmidt
- Curator: Tamara Joy
- Public transit access: Route 7, VOTRAN
- Website: www.moas.org

The Museum of Arts and Sciences, often referred to as MOAS, is a museum in Daytona Beach, Florida, United States. MOAS is the primary art, science and history museum in Central Florida. Programs are sponsored in part by the State of Florida, Department of State, Division of Arts & Culture, the Florida Arts Council, the National Endowment for the Arts and the County of Volusia.The museum is a member of the American Alliance of Museums and an affiliate of the Smithsonian Institution. It is home to the Cici and Hyatt Brown Museum of Art which contains a collection of Florida art, The Lowell and Nancy Lohman Planetarium, the only planetarium located on Florida's Space Coast, as well as 30,000 artifacts, making it one of the largest museums in central Florida.

== History ==
In 1954 the Community of Daytona Beach formed the "Committee for the Foundation of a Children’s Museum in the Halifax Area" and announced their plans to form what would become "The Halifax Childrens Museum" in September of that year. The Board of Public Instruction granted the future museum the use of a converted Quonset style hut located at the Mary Karl Vocational School, on what is now the Campus of Daytona State College. In the following year the Halifax Children’s Museum was officially incorporated as a non-profit institution.

In 1961 the “Halifax Children’s Museum” formally changed its name to the Museum of Arts and Sciences and began focusing on teaching science and history to adults and children alike. This necessitated a move from the original Quonset style building, and in 1964 the museum relocated to a new facility located on Daytona’s Tuscawilla Preserve. In 1972 the museum farther expanded to include a planetarium, which in partnership with the Volusia County School Board, acted as an analogue classroom for Volusia County students.

In 1977, art historian Gary Russell Libby was hired as the Executive Director of the Museum which, under his leadership, became accredited by the American Alliance of Museums and a Smithsonian Affiliate. The Museum grew from one location of 7,000 sq. ft. to 120,000 sq. ft. with three different locations. During his time as director, Libby organized and led the first international museum travel program in Florida. This annual program introduced cultural treasures in Mexico, Central America, South America, Europe, Scandinavia, North and Equatorial Africa, the Middle East, Asia and Australia to central Floridians who attended these educational and cultural expeditions. At his 2002 retirement, The Trustees of the Museum of Arts and Sciences named Libby as the first Director Emeritus and named the Lobby of the Museum as the "Gary R. Libby Entry Court."

The West Wing, renamed the L. Gale Lemerand Wing, was rebuilt and opened on October 30, 2015. This expansive wing of MOAS is home to the Cuban Foundation Museum, the Karshan Center of Graphic Art, the Elaine and Thurman Gillespy Jr. Gallery featuring African artifacts, the Marzullo Gallery featuring weaponry from around the world, and the Prehistory of Florida Gallery and the Charles and Linda William's Children's Museum. The L. Gale Lemerand Wing was originally built on a dip in the property and flooded in May 2009 due to heavy rains. The Museum was able to obtain FEMA funding that was matched in part by a Volusia County ECHO Grant and funding from the Museum to make reconstruction possible.

== Exhibits ==
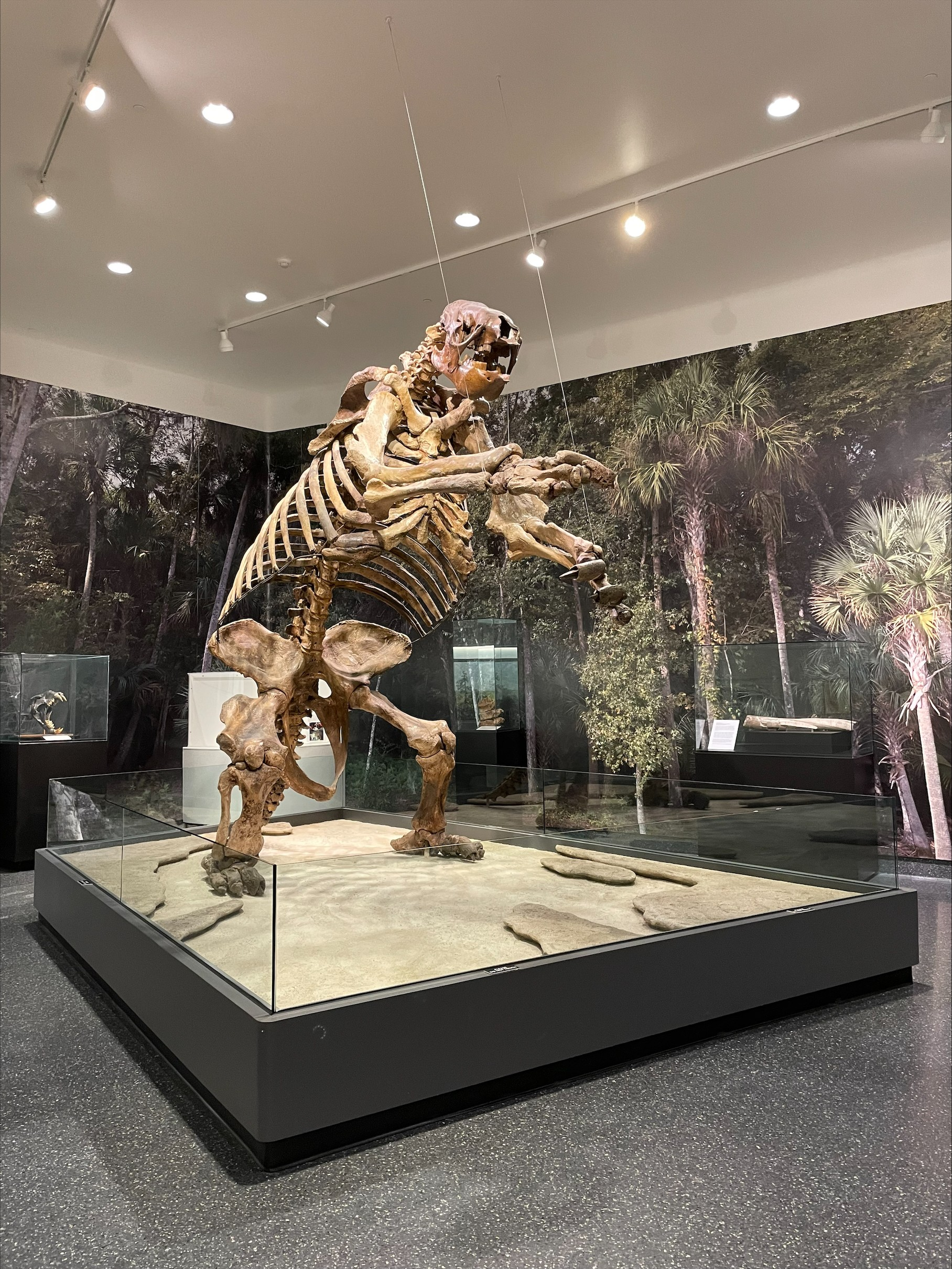
The skeleton of Eremotherium laurillardi (giant ground sloth) pictured is the most complete example of its kind in the world.

The main building on the museum's campus features 10 permanent exhibits, highlighting Florida's natural history, African and Cuban culture, Florida Art as well as science.

Some notable exhibits include:

- The most complete giant ground sloth (Eremotherium) skeleton in North America, housed in a Florida fossil gallery
- The largest permanent exhibition of Cuban art outside of Cuba
- A collection of international decorative arts and Early American furniture and art.
- A gallery of Chinese art.
- Visible storage

While about half of the exhibits are permanent, there are many exhibits which change every few months, many of which are curated in-house.

The museum also has its own theater, the Root Hall auditorium, which seats 265 guest.

== The Lowell and Nancy Lohman Planetarium ==
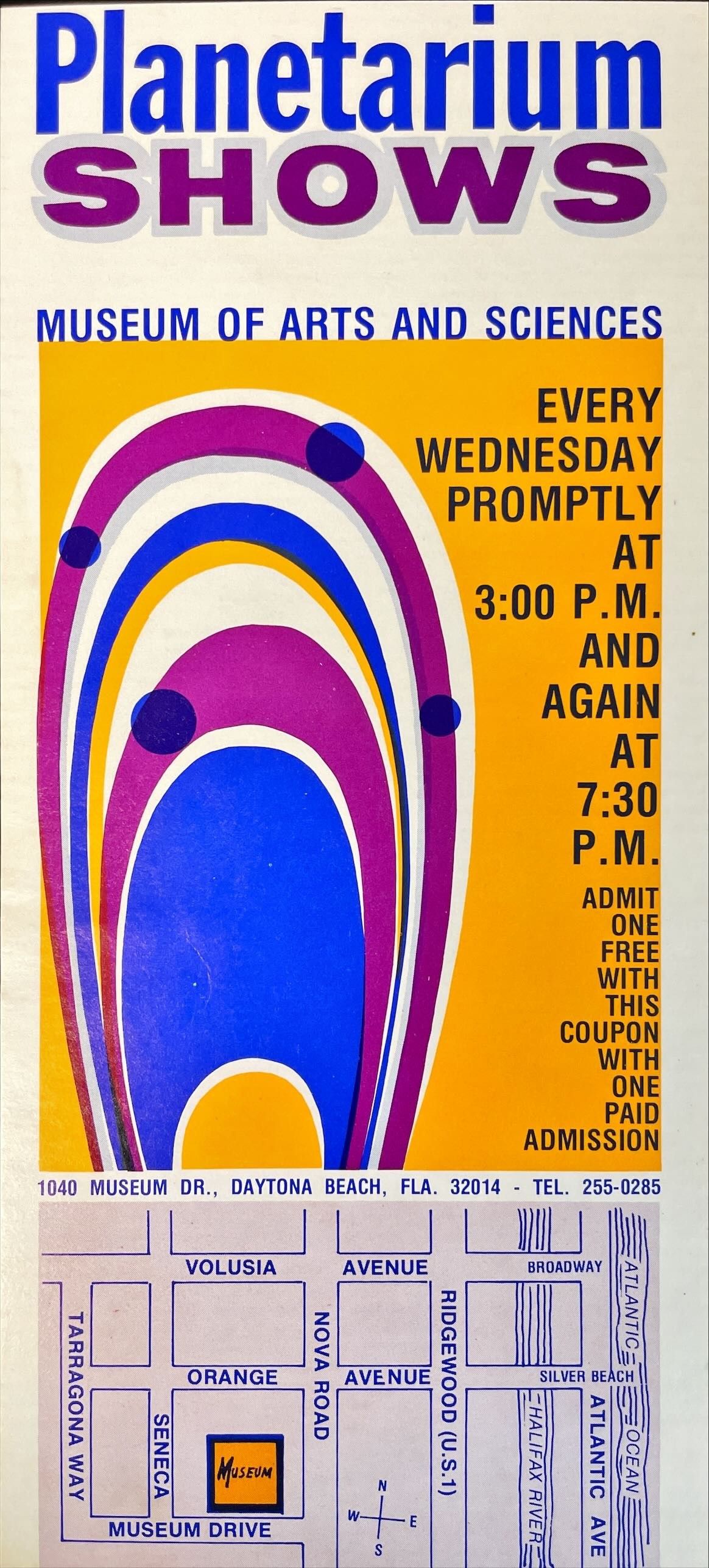
An early planetarium show brochure from the 1970's. In that era, public planetarium shows were held on Wednesdays and Sundays.

On October 11th, 1972, the newly minted "MOAS Planetarium" opened its doors to the public for the first time. One of its earliest presentations, titled "trip to the Moon" was presented during the Apollo 17 mission, the last crewed mission of the Apollo program, which launched to the moon just an hour south of Daytona in December of 1972. Since then, the Planetarium has followed NASA missions from the space coast, from Pioneer 10's flyby of Jupiter to the construction of Skylab, and the International Space Station up to the current NASA lunar program, Artemis. In 2014 the Planetarium was rebuilt as a new state-of-the-art facility, incorporating a fully digital projection system as well as an exhibit space. In 2021 the planetarium was formally named the Lowell and Nancy Lohman Planetarium.

== The Cici and Hyatt Brown Museum of Art ==
On May 7, 2012, the campus of the Museum of Arts & Sciences expanded with the construction of a new facility created for the display of Florida art and is the permanent home of more than 2,600 paintings of Florida, from the collection of Cici and Hyatt Brown. The current display features the largest collection of Florida art in the world.

== Charles and Linda William's Children's Museum ==
MOAS opened the first dedicated science center in the area on November 21, 2008. The Charles and Linda William's Children's Museum features hands-on science exhibits in a 9,000-square-foot (840 m^{2}) state-of-the-art facility. The Children's Museum is home to interactive exhibits that demonstrate various principles of science, including a raceway where kids can build their own vehicles, doctor and radiologist exhibits, video light microscope, a make-believe pizza parlor, and other science-focused exhibits.

== The Root Family Museum ==
This exhibit features Coca-Cola entrepreneur Chapman Root's (The Root Glass Company) lifetime collection of Americana, including two private rail cars (The two being the Skytop Lounge, 'Dell Rapids', and an Observation Dome, 'Silver Holly'.), Indy race cars sponsored by the family, and one of the largest known collections of historic Coca-cola artifacts and memorabilia in the world (2,490 objects featuring original molds and the original patents for the bottle),

== Gamble Place ==
Apart, from the Museum's main campus, MOAS is steward to Gamble Place; A historic district nestled among the Spruce Creek Preserve. This property features Florida's rich natural environment and a unique past told through the property's three historic house museums. Gamble Place has been developed and restored by the Museum of Arts & Sciences in cooperation with the Nature Conservancy and the City of Port Orange. It is a 175-acre (0.71 km^{2}) park with trails that covers five different ecosystems and is home to many endangered and threatened species.

== Klancke Environmental Education Complex ==
In 2005 MOAS opened the Kim A. Klancke, M.D. & Marsha L. Klancke Environmental Education Complex in Tuscawilla Preserve, a 90-acre (360,000 m^{2}) nature preserve in the middle of Daytona Beach that includes over 1/2 mile of boardwalks and nature trails. The preserve protects virgin Florida coastal hydric hammock, and is a habitat for endangered species of flora and fauna.
