= Gary Russell Libby =

American art historian

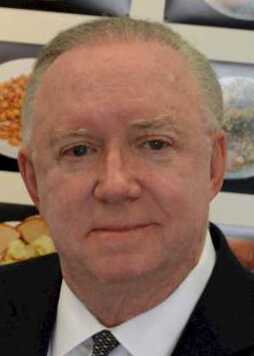
- Gary Russell Libby in 2015
- Born: June 7, 1944 (age 82); Boston, MA
- Education: University of Florida; Tulane University
- Occupations: Museum director; Art historian; Curator

Gary Russell Libby (born June 7, 1944) is an American art historian, author, educator and former museum director known for his books and scholarly exhibitions in the visual arts and his work on the history and development of the Florida School of Art.

== Early life and education ==
Libby was born in Boston, Massachusetts, and is the second of three sons of Sylvia Phillips Libby of Boston and Charles Willard Libby of Machias, Maine. After graduating from Fort Myers Senior High School, Fort Myers, Florida, he attended the University of Florida, receiving an Associate of Arts, Bachelor's, and Master's of Arts degrees in English Literature. Libby was awarded a post-graduate National Defense Education Act Fellowship to attend Tulane University, New Orleans, Louisiana, where he was accepted into the doctoral program with an interest in turn-of-the-century art and literature journals published in England, such as the Savoy and the Yellow Book. At Tulane, Libby worked with Dr. Jessie Poesch, Professor of Art History at Sophie Newcomb College, Tulane University, and author of the 1983 landmark publication The Arts of the Old South. After graduating from Tulane with another master's in English Literature and completing all coursework and examinations for the Ph.D., Libby was hired as an assistant professor by Stetson University in 1972.

== Career ==
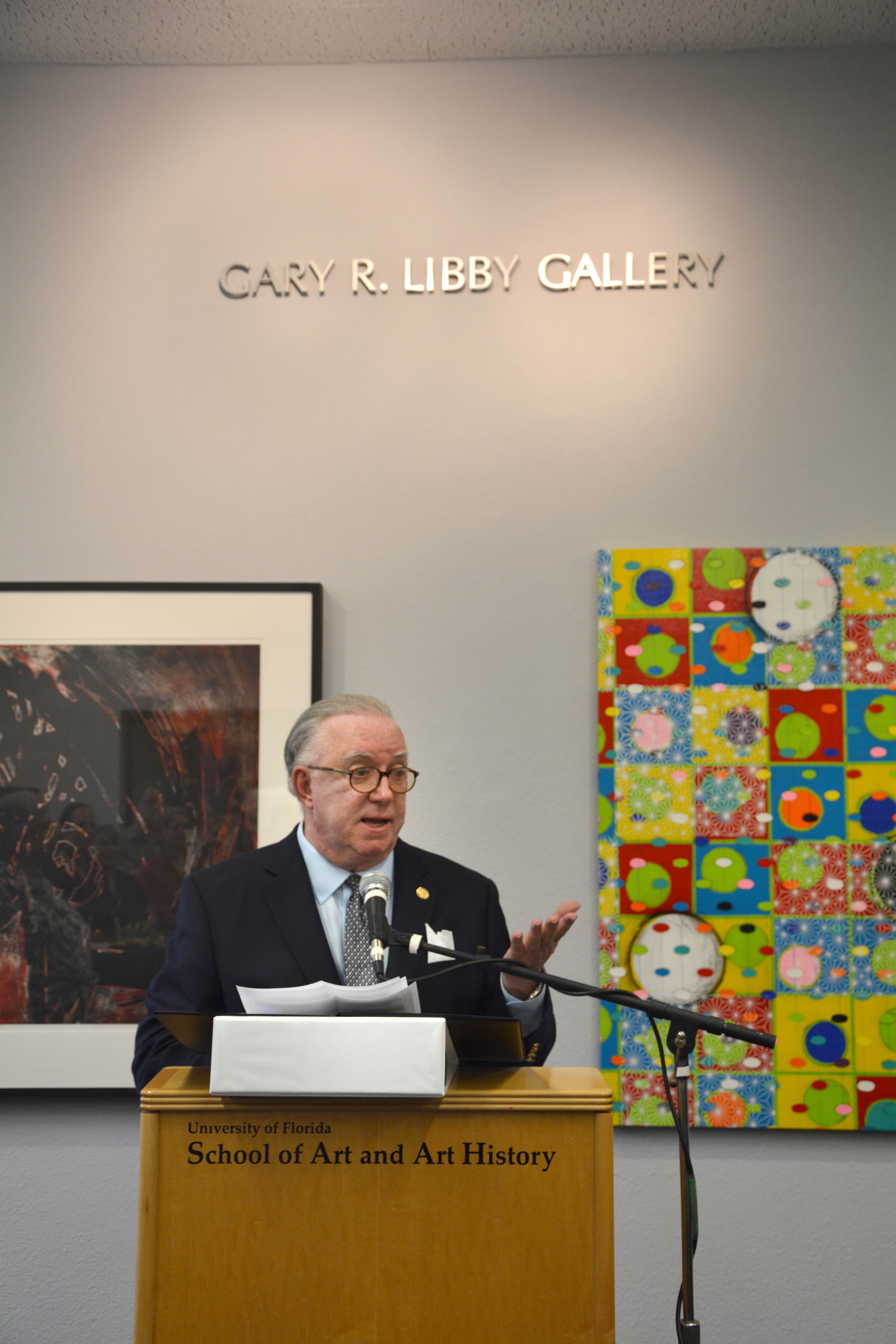
Gary Russell Libby in the Gary R. Libby Gallery

At Stetson University, DeLand, Florida, Libby developed the curriculum for several upper-division interdisciplinary courses for a new major in the arts and humanities. He also worked with Fred Messersmith, AWS, chairman of the Department of Art, in developing a series of exhibitions that explored the careers of artists from the United States and abroad who painted in Florida from post-Civil War to World War I. While at Stetson, Libby published several articles in academic journals, including the Italian Quarterly and Paideuma.

He also began his study of Cuban historic artists in the Fulgencio Batista Collection of Cuban art housed at the Cuban Foundation Museum, Museum of Arts and Sciences, Daytona Beach, Florida. Libby’s "Artistic Taste in Pre-Castro Cuba" was one of the lead papers presented at the Southeastern Museum Conference, Charleston, South Carolina, 1975. That paper became the foundation of two books Libby authored. (Two Centuries of Cuban Art: 1759-1959, a softcover bilingual catalog, published by the Ringling Museum of Art, with essays interpreting works of art from the Batista Collection exhibition, 1980. Libby curated the exhibition at the John and Mable Ringling Museum of Art, Sarasota, Florida, with additional works from the Museum of Modern Art, New York; The Solomon R. Guggenheim Museum, New York; and the Museum of Modern Art of Latin America, Washington, DC. Cuba-A History in Art, University Press of Florida, 1997, revised edition 2015.)

At Stetson University, Libby served as Secretary of the Faculty Senate and acting University Art Archivist. In 1975, he was elected as a Trustee at the Museum of Arts and Sciences, Daytona Beach, Florida. He became a Charter Member of the International Society of Fine Art Appraisers, Ltd.

In 1977, Libby was hired as the Executive Director of the Museum of Arts and Sciences, which became accredited by the American Alliance of Museums and a Smithsonian Affiliate under Libby’s leadership. The museum grew from one location of 7,000 sq. ft. to 120,000 sq. ft. with three different locations. Libby was also selected for and completed one of the first classes of the Smithsonian Institution’s Museum Leadership and Management Certification Program, directed by Jane Glaser. At the museum, Libby organized and led the first international museum travel program in Florida. This annual program introduced cultural treasures in Mexico, Central America, South America, Europe, Scandinavia, North and Equatorial Africa, the Middle East, Asia and Australia to thousands of central Floridians who attended these interpreted educational and cultural expeditions. At his 2002 retirement, the trustees of the Museum of Arts and Sciences named Libby the first Director Emeritus and the Lobby of the Museum the "Gary R. Libby Entry Court." A trustee-led community-wide effort also raised nearly one million dollars to endow the Gary R. Libby Curator of Art position at the Museum of Art and Sciences.

Libby continues to teach and lecture at Stetson University as a Visiting Professor / Guest Curator and also guest lectures for the Honors College at the University of Florida as an adjunct lecturer.

== Personal life and public service ==
Gary R. Libby lives in a restored National Register Colonial Revival House built in 1925 in Daytona Beach. He is active in several heritage, arts, and cultural organizations and was selected as a Daytona Beach Hometown Hero in 2016.

Libby is the past secretary of the Florida Association of Museums and received their Lifetime Achievement Award in 1998. He is a two-time past president of the Florida Art Museum Directors Association, who was presented with their Lifetime Achievement Award in 2000. Also in 2000, he was awarded the National Community Service Award by the National Junior Leagues of America. Libby was appointed to the Florida Arts Council through a gubernatorial appointment, 2005–2007. He served as a trustee at Stetson University from 2008 to 2011. In 2012, he was elected to the University of Florida Foundation. Libby was elected to the Board of Visitors at the Cornell Fine Art Museum at Rollins College, Winter Park, Florida, in 2014 and chaired the Exhibitions Committee. In 2014, he was selected as the citywide Mayoral representative to the Daytona Beach Charter Review Commission. He was also elected to the City of Daytona Beach Board of Adjustments in 2016.

Libby serves or has served on several Daytona Beach, Volusia County, State of Florida and National Advisory Boards including the Institute of Museum and Library Services (Libby served as a National Reviewer for their Grants Program) and the American Alliance of Museums, (he served as a Visiting on-site Accreditor for mid-size and large museums seeking accreditation from the AAM.) Both organizations are located in Washington, DC. Libby was the creator and moderator of a one-hour cultural information program, Culture Comes Alive, on radio AM 1380, streaming internationally on the web from 2013 to 2016.

== Exhibitions curated ==
In May 2016, Stetson University’s Hand Art Center hosted the exhibition “American Painting and the Florida School of Art,” organized by guest curator Gary R. Libby. This exhibition is one of over seventy-five Libby curated during his 30-year career as an arts educator, curator, and museum director.

Recent exhibitions curated by Libby and accompanied by publications include: Reflections - Paintings of Florida 1865-1965 (2009); Reflections II - Watercolors of Florida 1835-2000 (2012), the Bronze Award winner at the Florida Book Awards 2012; Chihuly – Form From Fire (1993), Cuba : A History in Art (1997, revised edition 2015); A Treasury of Indian Miniature Paintings (1992), and A Treasury of American Art(2003), The Henry Luce Foundation American Art Initiative Award recipient.

The Celebrating Florida – Works of Art from the Vickers Collection exhibition, curated by Libby, won the 1995 State of Florida Sesquicentennial Award. The exhibition, which included a companion book and video, toured the state throughout 1995 and concluded at the State Capitol Gallery in the newly constructed capitol building in Tallahassee, Florida.

== Publications and books ==
Gary R. Libby has edited and written books and catalogs on a number of topics in the arts and humanities to include:

- Cuba – A History in Art (1997) ISBN 0-933053-12-6, (Revised Edition, 2015) ISBN 978-0-8130-4998-4, University Press of Florida, 103 pgs.
- Reflections II Watercolors of Florida 1835-2000 (2012) ISBN 0-615-50859-6, Museum of Art and Sciences, 360 pgs.
- Reflections: Paintings of Florida 1865-1965 (2009) ISBN 0-933053-18-5, Museum of Art and Sciences, 184 pgs.
- A Treasury of American Art (2003), ISBN 0-933053-07-X, Museum of Art and Sciences (Luce Foundation), 230 pgs.
- Coast to Coast-The Contemporary Landscape in Florida (1999) ISBN 0-933053-14-2, Museum of Art and Sciences, 119 pgs.
- Celebrating Florida – Works of Art From The Vickers Collection (1995), ISBN first edition 0-933053-09-6, Museum of Art and Sciences and the University Press of Florida, 144 pgs.
- A Century of Jewelry and Gems (editor) (1995), ISBN 0-933053-08-8, Museum of Art and Sciences, 96 pgs.
- A Treasury of Indian Miniature Painting (editor) (1992), ISBN 0-933053-04-5, 9780933053045, Museum of Art and Sciences, 80 pgs.
- Alexander Archipenko: Themes and Variations (editor) (1989), ISBN 0-933053-03-7, Museum of Art and Sciences, 97 pgs.

== Honors and awards ==
1. 2016 Stetson University, DeLand, Florida, dedicated the largest gallery in the Homer and Dolly Hand Art Center as the Gary R. Libby Gallery of Art.
2. 2015 The University of Florida, College of the Arts, Gainesville, Florida, renamed the Focus Gallery as the Gary R. Libby Gallery of Art.
3. 2012 Bronze Award for Art History/Criticism from the Florida Book Awards for Reflections-II Watercolors of Florida 1865-2000.
4. 2003 American Art Initiative Publication Award, from the Henry Luce Foundation, for A Treasury of American Art.
5. 2000 Lifetime Achievement Award, the Florida Art Museum Directors Association.
6. 1995 State of Florida Sesquicentennial Award, Florida Division of Historical Resources, for Celebrating Florida – Works of Art from the Vickers Collection and Statewide tour of the exhibition concluding in the visual arts galleries at the State Capitol, Tallahassee, Florida.
7. 1998 Lifetime Achievement Award, Florida Association of Museums.
8. 1999 Outstanding Community Leadership Award, Halifax Area Chamber of Commerce
