= Florida State Road 421 =

State highway in Florida, United States

State Road 421 and County Road 421
- SR 421 in red, CR 421 in blue

Route information
- Length: 4.001 mi (6.439 km)

Major junctions
- West end: CR 421 in Port Orange
- I-95 in Port Orange
- East end: US 1 / SR A1A in Port Orange

Location
- Country: United States
- State: Florida
- County: Volusia

Highway system
- Florida State Highway System; Interstate; US; State; Former; Pre‑1945; Toll; Scenic
← SR 419	→ SR 423

State Road 421 (SR 421) is a major thoroughfare that runs east–west through Port Orange, Florida from Interstate 95 (I-95) east to U.S. Route 1 (US 1) where it turns into SR A1A. It is partially six lanes (from I-95 east to SR 5A) and 4 lanes (from SR 5A east to US 1), and is known locally as Taylor Road (for about 1/2 mile (0.80 km) east of I-95) and Dunlawton Avenue.

Taylor Road continues west as County Road 421 (CR 421) to CR 415 (Tomoka Farms Road).

== Route description ==
Taylor Road begins as an unmarked west to east local road off of Guava Drive, another unmarked local road that runs south to north. East of the intersection with County Road 415, the road receives the designation of County Road 421. The first landmarks that CR 421 passes are a Volusia County Fire Station, and the Spruce Creek Baptist Church. East of the north gate to the Spruce Creek Airport gated community, CR 421 curves to the northeast. Along the way it runs between a pair of churches before the driveway to the Cracker Creek Campground, which also leads to the NRHP-registered Gamble Place Historic District. Northeast of there, the road passes by the Crane Lakes Golf and Country Club. The route takes a slight curve to the east-northeast as it passes by the Vineyards and Summer Trees developments before approaching more commercialized development. The route becomes a state road just west of the intersection with County Road 4009 and merely feet away from the intersection approaches the interchange with Interstate 95 at exit 256, after which Florida State Road 421 moves northeast onto Dunlawton Avenue a divided highway with foliage in the median, most often palm trees. Taylor Road resumes east of the interchange at the same trajectory, but this time as a local city street.

Dunlawton Avenue takes SR 421 in a north-northeasterly direction, then curves more towards the east just before the intersection with County Road 483 (Clyde Morris Boulevard). From there it runs east-northeast, flanked by medical offices, shopping centers, and apartment buildings, many of which are obstructed by native foliage. The first intersection in this segment is with Victoria Gardens Boulevard and City Center Parkway, the latter of which leads to various government offices, including the Port Orange City Hall, library and numerous city parks. Most of the shopping centers continue to remain hidden by foliage even as the route approaches the intersection with Florida State Road 5A, with the exception of the one on the southeast corner of SRs 5A and 421. The road makes another slight left curve around the intersection with Jackson Avenue, running more northeast. The tree-lined median becomes less prominent (though it doesn't disappear) just before the intersection of Spruce Creek Road which runs parallel with the Halifax Canal and the culvert for that canal beneath SR 421.

Standard commercial development gives way to medical and legal offices, as well as residencies, with the solitary exception of a boat dealership, which is where it takes a bend to the east-southeast before the crossing of the main line of the Florida East Coast Railway, then passes by the Port Orange Elementary School, just before running along the northern edge of the Dunlawton Avenue Historic District. Florida SR 421 ends at the intersection of U.S. Route 1 and Florida State Road A1A, but Dunlawton Avenue continues east as northbound SR A1A to the Port Orange Causeway where it will turn north along Atlantic Avenue.

== Major intersections ==
The entire route is in Port Orange, Volusia County.

mi	km	Destinations	Notes
0.000	0.000	West end of state maintenance	
0.055	0.089	CR 4009 (South Williamson Boulevard)	
0.128– 0.338	0.206– 0.544	I-95 (SR 9) to I-4 – Jacksonville, Miami	I-95 exit 256
1.068	1.719	CR 483 (Clyde Morris Boulevard)	
2.382	3.833	SR 5A (Nova Road)	
4.001	6.439	US 1 (South Ridgewood Avenue / SR 5) / SR A1A north (Dunlawton Avenue)	
1.000 mi = 1.609 km; 1.000 km = 0.621 mi
