= Gamble Place Historic District =

Historic district in Florida, United States

- U.S. National Register of Historic Places
- U.S. Historic district
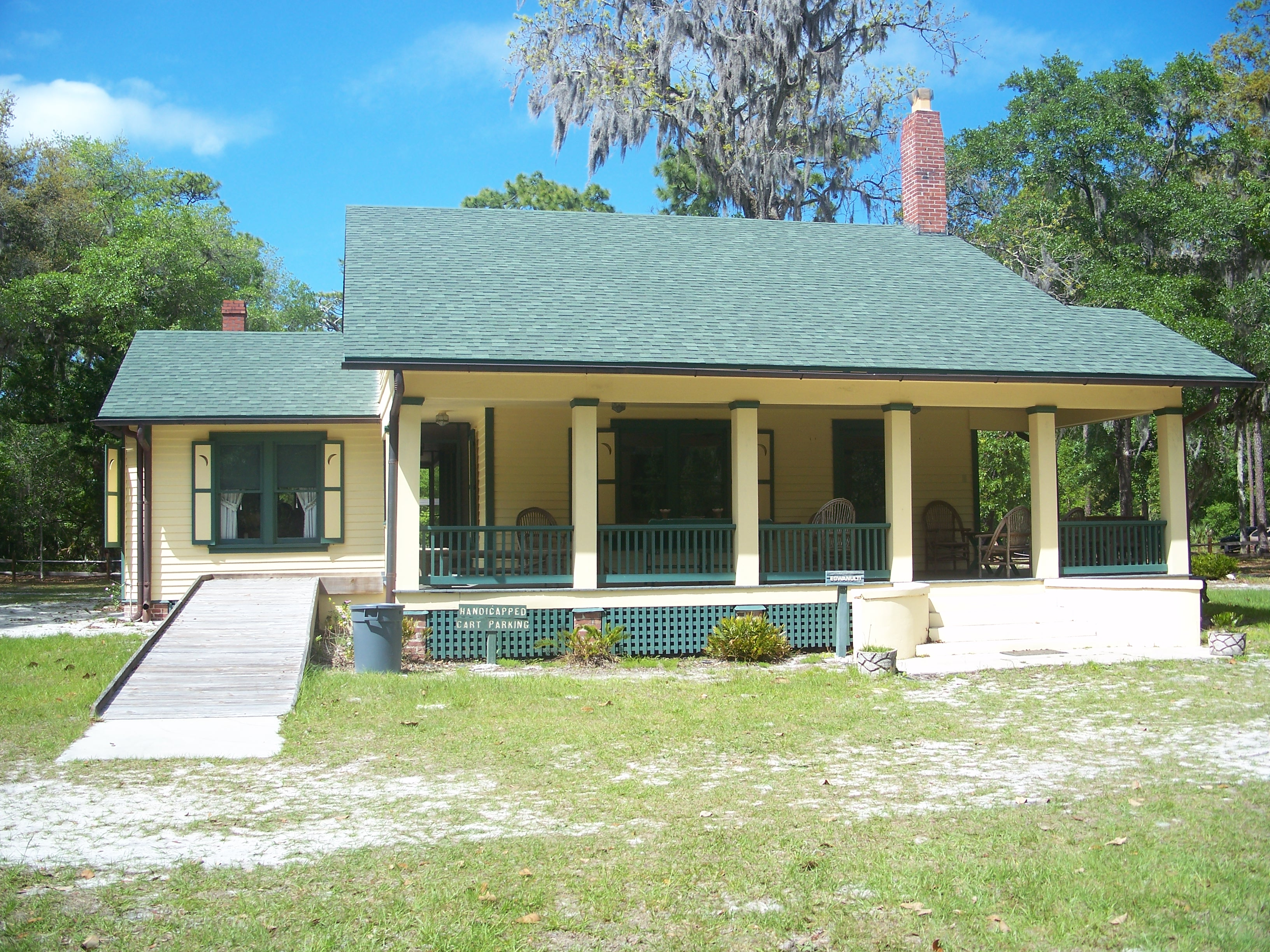
- Egwanulti, James N. Gamble's cracker cottage retreat

- Location within Volusia County
- Location: Port Orange, Florida
- Coordinates: 29°5′22″N 81°2′44″W
- Area: 90 acres (0.36 km^{2})
- NRHP reference No.: 93000563
- Added to NRHP: September 29, 1993

The Gamble Place Historic District is a U.S. historic district (designated as such on September 29, 1993) located in Port Orange, Florida. The district is at 1819 Taylor Road. It contains 6 historic buildings, 5 structures, and 14 objects.
