= Mount Moriah Baptist Church (Middlesboro, Kentucky) =

Historic church in Kentucky, United States

- Mt. Moriah Baptist Church
- U.S. National Register of Historic Places
- Location within Kentucky Location within the United States
- Location: 314 N. Main St., Middlesboro, Kentucky
- Coordinates: 36°36′39″N 83°42′48″W
- Area: less than one acre
- Built: 1918-21
- Architectural style: Gothic, Romanesque
- NRHP reference No.: 85001747
- Added to NRHP: August 8, 1985

Mt. Moriah Baptist Church is a historic church at 314 N. Main Street in Middlesboro, Kentucky. It was built during 1918-21 and added to the National Register of Historic Places in 1985.

It is a brick building with brick laid in common bond.

It was deemed significant as "The church building has played an important role in the history of the black community of Middlesboro and is a visible expression of the important role blacks have played in the settlement and later development of planned communities such as Middlesboro," which is the largest planned community in southeastern Kentucky.
