= John Milton Hawks =

American abolitionist

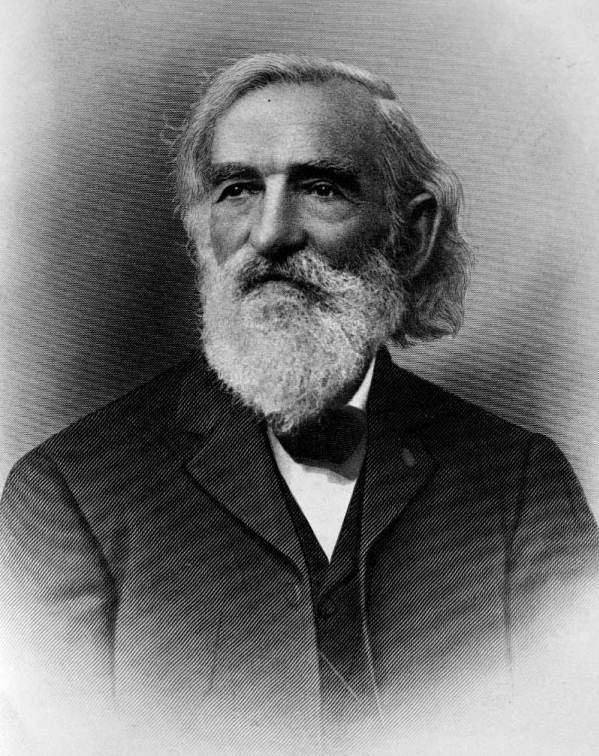
Hawks, circa 1870

John Milton Hawks (November 26, 1826 – April 2, 1910) was a United States abolitionist, surgeon and organizer for the assistance of freed blacks and black soldiers during the U.S. Civil War as well as a businessman and Florida settler in Volusia County. During Reconstruction he was secretary of the board of registration for Volusia County. He was also clerk of the Florida House of Representatives from 1868 to 1870. A plaque in his honor is located at the Edgewater City Hall at 104 North Riverside Drive in Edgewater, Florida. Hawks wrote The East Coast of Florida: A Descriptive Narrative, published in 1887 by L.J. Sweett and/ or Lewis & Winsship He is listed as a Great Floridian. His wife, Esther Hill Hawks, was also a doctor and helped educate black soldiers and their families. She was an 1857 graduate of the New England Female Medical College.

In addition to being a physician, Hawks was an author, historian, teacher, newspaper publisher, army officer, orange grower, first superintendent of Volusia County Schools and founder of Hawks Park, later renamed Edgewater Park. Esther's diary was found in an attic in 1975 and published as A Woman Doctor's Civil War: Esther Hill Hawks' Diary. It was edited by Gerald Schwartz and covers a period before the Hawks settled in Florida.

== Biography ==
Hawks was born on November 26, 1826, in Bradford, New Hampshire, to Colburn and Clarissa Brown Hawks. He passed the teacher's exam at age 15, studied medicine two years later while teaching in Georgia and received his medical degree in 1847. Hawks was a doctor and staunch abolitionist in Manchester, New Hampshire, until volunteering as a physician to treat freed black soldiers during the Civil War.

In December 1861, he volunteered as a physician in South Carolina to treat escaped slaves in Sea Islands, South Carolina. He established a school for the freed blacks and "recruited most of the 33rd Colored Troops for the Union Army then served as their physician" and "was one of the first to urge emancipation of the slaves and to use them as soldiers." He was appointed Assistant Surgeon with the rank of Major in the Union Army's 33rd Colored Troops.

Hawks was then appointed Surgeon of the 21st Colored Troops and practiced in Jacksonville, Florida in 1872 after his service in the U.S. Civil War. He treated former slaves and freedmen, who he had also advocated for before the war. Hawks advocated for the creation of the first Freedman's Savings Bank. In 1865, he helped found the Florida Land and Lumber Company with other officers. The business provided homes and jobs for freed slaves. He named the business's settlement for freed blacks Port Orange, and some of the families remained in the area now known as Freemanville. Most of the homesteads were located north of Spruce Creek and northwest of the inlet, near Dunlawton. Its first post office was built in 1867 in what is now the town of Ponce Inlet and was moved a few miles north in 1868. Esther taught with the Freedmen's Aid Society and may have established the first integrated school in Florida.

Sandy soil proved a challenge and corruption is believed to have caused supplies to be stolen before being delivered to the settlement which soon failed. A report found the colonists who remained in poor condition and surviving by eating coutee or coontie (the starchy roots of a native plant), palmetto cabbage and fish they caught.

Esther continued teaching after the colony's decline, but in January 1869 a new schoolhouse was torched and in 1870 she returned to New England to practice medicine. Eighty-three blacks remained in the eastern part of Volusia County. Hawks planted an orange grove south of Port Orange on the Indian River and established Hawks Park in 1871, it was renamed Edgewater by the Florida State Legislature in 1924.

Henry Tolliver, a successful black homesteader, and Hannah Tolliver owned land in the northwest corner of Port Orange. Some of the former colonists lived on their land in a community later dubbed Freemanville. Tolliver made molasses and grew corn, cotton, peas, beans and sweet potatoes. His wife made and sold clothing.

Hawks died April 2, 1910, and was buried in Hawks Park Cemetery in Volusia County. It was later renamed Edgewater New Smyrna Cemetery and is located in what is now Edgewater, Florida, at plot location Old North, Section 3. A monument to the couple is also located in Pine Grove Cemetery in Manchester, New Hampshire. In 1924 Hawks Park was renamed Edgewater.
