= Mount Moriah Missionary Baptist Church =

Coordinates: 28.594683°N 81.357062°W

- Mount Moriah Missionary Baptist Church
- Country: USA
- Denomination: Baptist

History
- Founded: 1886

Mount Moriah Missionary Baptist Church was founded in 1886 and was the first black Baptist church organized in Winter Park, Florida, United States. Originally, the church began at the home of Reverend Charles and Mrs. Missouri Ambrose on Pennsylvania Avenue in the town's predominantly African American Westside.

The church presented the community with a safe place to form close friendships, and offered a number of wholesome activities for children and adults. Clyde W. Hall, a member of the church, recalls that “the church also provided a place where African-Americans could dress in their best attire on Sundays and enjoy equality without encountering the racial deprivations of everyday living in the South at that time.” The first minister to lead the congregation was Reverend Charles Johnson Smith, who came to Mount Moriah in 1887. Reverend Smith's position as a moderator of the First Florida Missionary Baptist Association helped allow the developing church to be granted membership in the organization in 1910. Reverend Smith continued to serve Mount Moriah until 1911.

== History ==
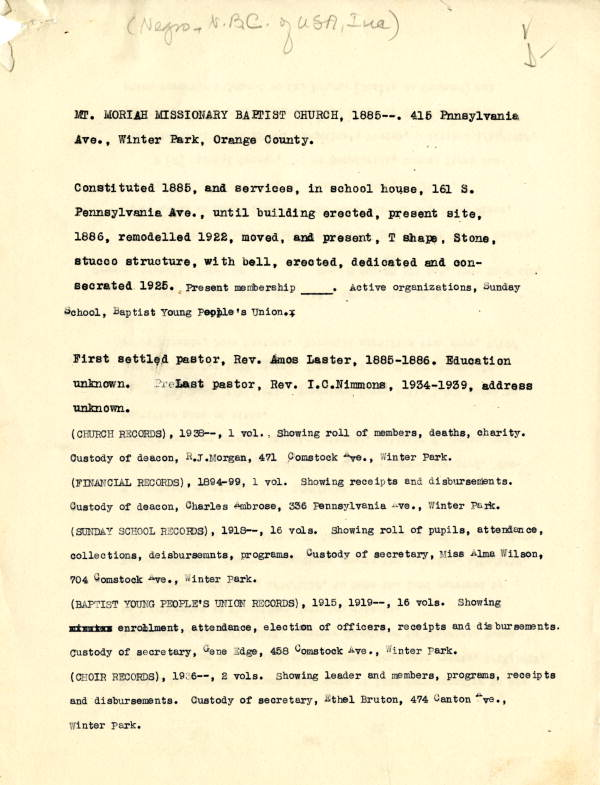
WPA Church Record for Mt. Moriah Missionary Baptist Church

From the time of its founding in 1886 until 1935, membership in Mt. Moriah grew. “Soon the Ambroses' home could no longer accommodate the number of people attending the church. So, until the church had a building of its own, it held meetings on alternate Sundays at the Winter Park Town Hall". On March 16, 1888, the trustees of Mt. Moriah purchased lots one and three of block 70 from the Winter Park Company for a church site. These lots, located on the southwest corner of West Lyman and Pennsylvania Avenues, are the home of two church buildings. “On April 26, 1912, Mt. Moriah Baptist Church also purchased for $165.00 from Charles and Helen Morse of Chicago, Illinois Lot Thirteen in Block Sixty-nine to locate a parsonage on West Comstock Avenue".

“In 1935, the funds from the estate of William A Coursen enabled Mt. Moriah to build its present sanctuary. The edifice was built at a cost of $8,500. Rev. I.C. Nimmons, the Church’s seventh pastor, provided leadership over the building project. Rev. Nimmons instituted the first Missionary Society, the Junior Church, and the Junior Choir". Construction of the new church building was performed by the African-American Ford Construction Company of Orlando. Since many local citizens were employed by this company, the assembly of the building helped bring the community together and stir up enthusiasm for the new chapel.

William A. Coursen was a graduate of Princeton University and an established citizen of Winter Park. In Coursen's will he wished to have his estate auctioned off and the funds divided equally among several beneficiaries, including the Salvation Army, the Red Cross of Orlando, and the Public Library of Winter Park. Also, funds were allotted “to all the churches of Winter Park irrespective of creed, color or denomination any church home, the House of God". Following Coursen's death in early 1934, each church in Winter Park (including the seven African-American churches) received a donation of approximately $8,500. “With this money every African-American Church in Winter Park built a new edifice in 1935 or 1936, except Wards Chapel A.M.E. Church who used its money to improve its present structure and purchase additional property".

The new building allowed the church and its programs to flourish. Between 1941 and 1946, under the leadership of Rev. L. A. Pelham (Mount Moriah's eighth pastor), the church began conducting regular mass every Sunday. New church programs developed over the years which further increased community involvement in the church, such as the Young Adult Choir (organized in 1959) and the Junior Women Missionary Society (organized in 1971).

As of 2011, Mount Moriah Missionary Baptist Church is led by its 11th pastor, Rev. A. C. Cobb. “Like many Black churches across the nation, Mt. Moriah is facing an aging congregation and tackling the job of finding younger members". The church has a congregation of approximately 150 members, of which a large portion is over age 50.

In the year 2013 Reverend A.C. Cobb retired as pastor due to age and health reasons.

In 2015, God blessed Mount Moriah Missionary Baptist Church with its 12th pastor, Reverend Weaver Blondin. God, through Pastor Blondin's spiritual leadership and guidance are doing amazing things. The Mount Moriah congregation, affectionately known as "The Mount" is now growing in membership and most importantly growing spiritually and there is an air of change in the sanctuary. More and more people are attending services regularly.

== Church leadership ==
- Rev. Smith (1887–1911)
- Rev. J.M. Mells (no dates available)
- Rev. Steward (no dates available)
- Rev. J.J. Collins (no dates available)
- Rev. V.S. Summers (until 1928)
- Rev. R.C. Jones (1929–1930
- Rev. Nimmons (1930–1941)
- Rev. L.A. Pelham (1941–1946)
- Rev. King Solomon Wilson (1946–1981)
- Rev. Clarence R. Taylor (1982–1989)
- Rev. Alphonzo C. Cobb (1989–2013)
- Rev. Weaver Blondin (2015–present)
