= Esther Hill Hawks =

American physician, educator and activist

Esther Hill Hawks (August 4, 1833 – May 6, 1906) was an American teacher, medical doctor, and activist during the American Civil War.

== Early life and education ==
Hawks was born in Hooksett, New Hampshire. Her parents- Parmena and Jane (Kimball) had eight children in which she was the fifth. Additionally, Hawks' ancestry revealed that both of her grandfathers, John Hill of Andover and Jedediah Kimball, served as soldiers during the War of the Revolution. Prior to her medical training, she attended the public schools in Hooksett, Suncook, and Exter, and later on attended high school in Manchester. After attending public school, she fought for women's rights and also became a teacher in her hometown. In October 1854, she married John Milton Hawks, who was a well-known surgeon during the US Civil War. After reading her husband's medical books, and taking care of his patients, she studied at the New England Female Medical College in Boston, earning her medical degree in 1857 with a medical degree. She remained practicing in Boston, Massachusetts up until 1862.

== Career ==
Despite holding a medical degree, Hawks was denied a position as either an army doctor or an army nurse. Hawks began to volunteer in hospitals and later taught in South Carolina as her husband moved there for a physician role. Hawks first began teaching at the Methodist Church, where she taught 300 people ranging from all ages. Over time, her teaching role grew to include former slaves and in turn the first official black regiment. After her husband became involved with an established hospital for people of color in Beaufort, South Carolina, Hawks assumed a larger and more clinical role. During this time, she would help assist her husband during surgery and would tend to soldiers. At times while her husband was busy or away, she would be in charge of the hospital. Due to the social stigma of a woman with such a powerful role tending to black patients, she would often hide how large of a role she played during her time at the hospital. Between South Carolina and Florida, Hawks continued to occupy her time through medical volunteering and educating black individuals. After some time, Hawks began to question her involvement in society, feeling as though she was "wasting time which should be devoted to my profession". She also began to mourn her maternal instinct and inability to have children. Her frustration became devotion towards teaching and personal relationships which she formed with her students and patients. This led to Hawks opening up her own school in Odd Fellows' Hall, which was the first of its kind, as it was open for all students regardless of their race. Subsequently, she became the General Superintendent of the city schools, an administrator for the Freedmen's Bureau, and helped run an orphanage for black children. Many times, Hawks highlighted the bare lives black children and former slaves lead with feelings of sadness and a goal to help them as much as possible. She pursued this goal by continuing to teach her black pupils, as well as providing her medical services for free to those who needed them. Hawks writes of her "scholars" as well behaving and likely to obey. She highlighted the lack of disciplinary measures and "revolts" her school leads with pride. Although she taught equally and integrated both white and black students in the same class, not all parents agreed with her integrative methods and were opposed to her actions. A primary response to this was the withdrawal of their student. It is noted that Hawks was always saddened but accepting of everyone's ideals although she worked to integrate African Americans.

After returning to Massachusetts in 1870, Hawks partnered with Dr. Lizzie Breed Welch, who had her own practice and together they became two out of the first three female physicians in Lynn. Soon after in 1874, she opened her own medical practice and treated mostly women with gynecological cases. During this time, she worked in various organizations including the New England Hospital Medical Society, Boston Gynecological Society, honorary member of the New Hampshire Association of Military Surgeons, Woman's Rights/Suffrage Club, The Houghton Horticultural Society, the Lynn Historical Society, the Civic League, Lynn Medical Fraternity, Lynn Woman's Club, Lynn Woman's Club and even co-founded Lynn's Associated Charities while working to better the sanitary conditions of her community, provide further education, and promote women's rights. In 1889, Hawks was elected as a member of the Lynn School Board where she continued to serve for many years to come.

Becoming ill in 1906, Hawks' condition grew progressively worse, and she eventually died in her home in Lynn, Massachusetts on May 6, 1906. After her death, he included in her will for scholarships to be given to students in Lynn High School who wrote the best essays on the subject of peace, leaving much of her fortune to help promote the education of future generations.
