= Port Orange, Florida =

- City
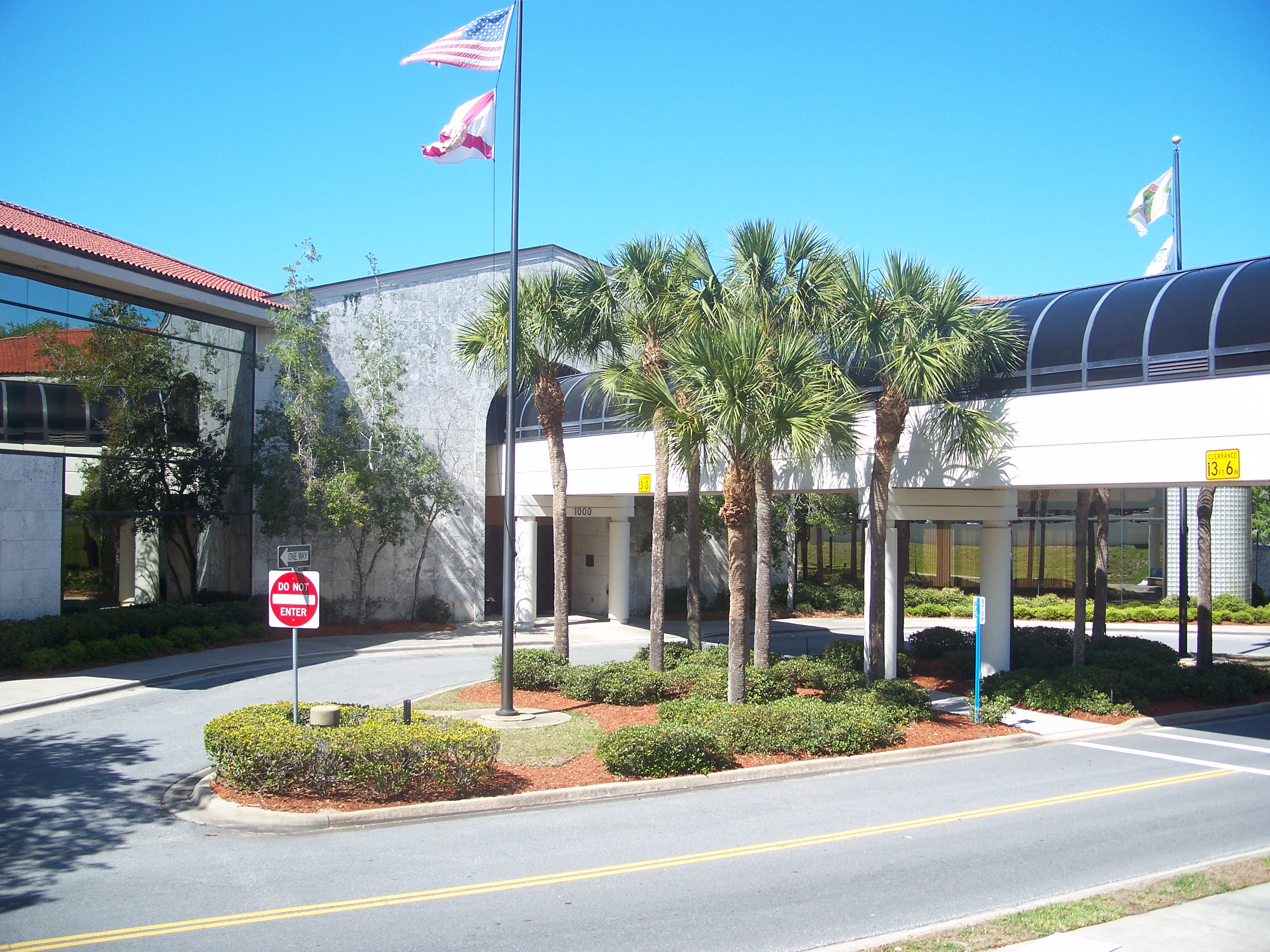
- Port Orange City Hall

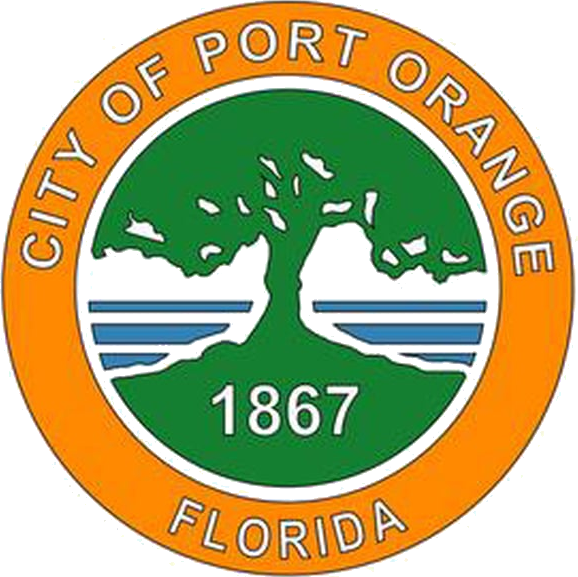
- Flag Seal

- Location in Volusia County and the state of Florida

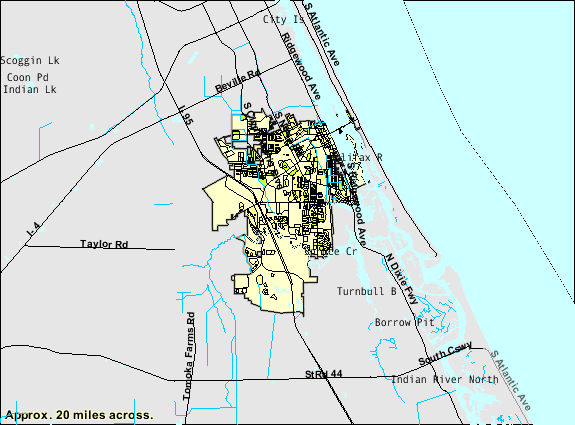
- U.S. Census Bureau map showing city limits
- Coordinates: 29°07′20″N 81°59′32″W
- Country: United States
- State: Florida
- County: Volusia
- Incorporated: April 26, 1867

Government
  - Type: Council-Manager

Area
  - City: 28.86 sq mi (74.74 km^{2})
  - Land: 26.83 sq mi (69.49 km^{2})
  - Water: 2.03 sq mi (5.25 km^{2}) 7.1%
- Elevation: 36 ft (11 m)

Population (2020)
  - City: 62,596
  - Density: 2,333.0/sq mi (900.76/km^{2})
  - Metro: 494,593
- Time zone: UTC-5 (EST)
  - Summer (DST): UTC-4 (EDT)
- ZIP codes: 32123, 32127-32129
- Area code: 386
- FIPS code: 12-58575
- GNIS feature ID: 2404555
- Website: http://www.port-orange.org

Port Orange is a city in Volusia County, Florida, United States. The city is part of the larger Deltona–Daytona Beach–Ormond Beach metropolitan area. Port Orange is a principal city in the Fun Coast region of the state of Florida. As of the 2020 census, the city had a population of 62,596.

Port Orange was settled by John Milton Hawks, who brought freed African Americans to work at his sawmill after the U.S. Civil War. Esther Hawks established an integrated school in the area. The colony struggled soon after its creation and most colonists left. The area that became known as Freemanville is a legacy of the settlers who stayed in the area.

== Geography ==
According to the United States Census Bureau, the city has a total area of 28.7 square miles (74.3 km^{2}), of which 26.6 square miles (69.0 km^{2}) is land and 2.0 square miles (5.3 km^{2}) (7.09%) is water.

=== Climate ===
The climate in this area is characterized by hot, humid summers and generally mild winters. According to the Köppen climate classification, the City of Port Orange has a humid subtropical climate zone (Cfa).

Climate data for Port Orange
Month	Jan	Feb	Mar	Apr	May	Jun	Jul	Aug	Sep	Oct	Nov	Dec	Year
Mean daily maximum °C (°F)	20.6 (69.1)	22.4 (72.3)	24.5 (76.1)	26.9 (80.4)	29.5 (85.1)	31.2 (88.2)	31.8 (89.2)	31.9 (89.4)	30.4 (86.7)	28.0 (82.4)	24.4 (75.9)	22.1 (71.8)	27.0 (80.6)
Daily mean °C (°F)	15.6 (60.1)	17.4 (63.3)	19.5 (67.1)	22.0 (71.6)	24.9 (76.8)	26.8 (80.2)	27.5 (81.5)	27.7 (81.9)	26.6 (79.9)	23.9 (75.0)	20.0 (68.0)	17.5 (63.5)	22.5 (72.4)
Mean daily minimum °C (°F)	10.8 (51.4)	12.7 (54.9)	14.7 (58.5)	17.5 (63.5)	20.8 (69.4)	23.5 (74.3)	24.4 (75.9)	24.7 (76.5)	23.7 (74.7)	20.4 (68.7)	16.1 (61.0)	13.3 (55.9)	18.6 (65.4)
Average precipitation mm (inches)	19.1 (0.75)	24.9 (0.98)	26.0 (1.02)	26.6 (1.05)	40.7 (1.60)	74.3 (2.93)	100.3 (3.95)	99.3 (3.91)	85.0 (3.35)	30.7 (1.21)	20.5 (0.81)	23.9 (0.94)	571.3 (22.5)
Source: Weather.Directory

== Demographics ==
Historical population
Census	Pop.	Note	%±
1920	380		—
1930	678		78.4%
1940	662		−2.4%
1950	1,201		81.4%
1960	1,801		50.0%
1970	3,781		109.9%
1980	18,756		396.1%
1990	35,317		88.3%
2000	45,823		29.7%
2010	56,048		22.3%
2020	62,596		11.7%
2025 (est.)	66,395		6.1%
U.S. Decennial Census

=== Racial and ethnic composition ===
Port Orange racial composition (Hispanics excluded from racial categories) (NH = Non-Hispanic)
Race	Pop 2010	Pop 2020	% 2010	% 2020
White (NH)	49,392	50,709	88.12%	81.01%
Black or African American (NH)	1,790	2,412	3.19%	3.85%
Native American or Alaska Native (NH)	147	152	0.26%	0.24%
Asian (NH)	1,250	1,991	2.23%	3.18%
Pacific Islander or Native Hawaiian (NH)	21	40	0.04%	0.06%
Some other race (NH)	88	266	0.16%	0.42%
Two or more races/Multiracial (NH)	825	2,472	1.47%	3.95%
Hispanic or Latino (any race)	2,535	4,554	4.52%	7.28%
Total	56,048	62,596		

=== 2020 census ===
As of the 2020 census, Port Orange had a population of 62,596. The median age was 49.0 years. 17.1% of residents were under the age of 18 and 27.2% of residents were 65 years of age or older. For every 100 females there were 92.1 males, and for every 100 females age 18 and over there were 90.7 males age 18 and over.

99.8% of residents lived in urban areas, while 0.2% lived in rural areas.

There were 27,510 households in Port Orange, of which 22.3% had children under the age of 18 living in them. Of all households, 45.0% were married-couple households, 18.4% were households with a male householder and no spouse or partner present, and 28.8% were households with a female householder and no spouse or partner present. About 29.9% of all households were made up of individuals and 15.8% had someone living alone who was 65 years of age or older.

There were 30,285 housing units, of which 9.2% were vacant. The homeowner vacancy rate was 1.8% and the rental vacancy rate was 8.0%.

Racial composition as of the 2020 census
Race	Number	Percent
White	51,949	83.0%
Black or African American	2,513	4.0%
American Indian and Alaska Native	198	0.3%
Asian	2,009	3.2%
Native Hawaiian and Other Pacific Islander	45	0.1%
Some other race	1,320	2.1%
Two or more races	4,562	7.3%
Hispanic or Latino (of any race)	4,554	7.3%

=== 2010 census ===
As of the 2010 United States census, there were 56,048 people, 23,447 households, and 14,977 families residing in the city.

== Economy ==
The largest industries in Port Orange by number of employed residents are health care and social assistance, retail trade, and food service and accommodations. The retail center of the city is the Port Orange Pavilion, an outdoor mall with around 50 shops and restaurants, office spaces, and a movie theater.

== Education ==
Public primary and secondary education is handled by Volusia County Schools. Port Orange schools are A-rated by the state, and one of the high schools, Spruce Creek High School, has made the list of one of the top 100 high schools in the nation for several years in a row, as well as offering students the International Baccalaureate program.

=== Elementary schools ===
- Horizon Elementary School
- Spruce Creek Elementary School
- Sugar Mill Elementary School
- Cypress Creek Elementary School
- Sweetwater Elementary School
- Port Orange Elementary School
- South Daytona Elementary School

=== Middle schools ===
- Creekside Middle School
- Silver Sands Middle School
- Campbell Middle School
- David C. Hinson Sr. Middle School
- Deland Middle School
- Deltona Middle School
- Galaxy Middle School
- Heritage Middle School
- Holly Hill Middle School
- New Smyrna Beach Middle School
- Ormond Beach Middle School
- River Springs Middle School
- Southwestern Middle School
- T. Dewitt Taylor Middle-High

=== High schools ===
- Spruce Creek High School
- Atlantic High School
- Deland High School
- Deltona High School
- Mainland High School
- New Smyrna Beach High School
- Pine Ridge High School
- Seabreeze High School
- University High School
- T. Dewitt Taylor Middle-High

=== Colleges and universities ===
Port Orange is the home of the Florida campus of Palmer College of Chiropractic. The campus in Port Orange was founded in 2002 by James E. Hether, D. C.

== Culture ==
The Kenneth W. Parker Amphitheater hosts events such as the annual Lakeside Jazz Festival.

== Government ==
City Council district map, 2025

The City of Port Orange operates under a council–manager government. The mayor is independently elected citywide in non-partisan elections every four years. The city council consists of four members, representing specific districts, elected to four-year terms in non-partisan elections.

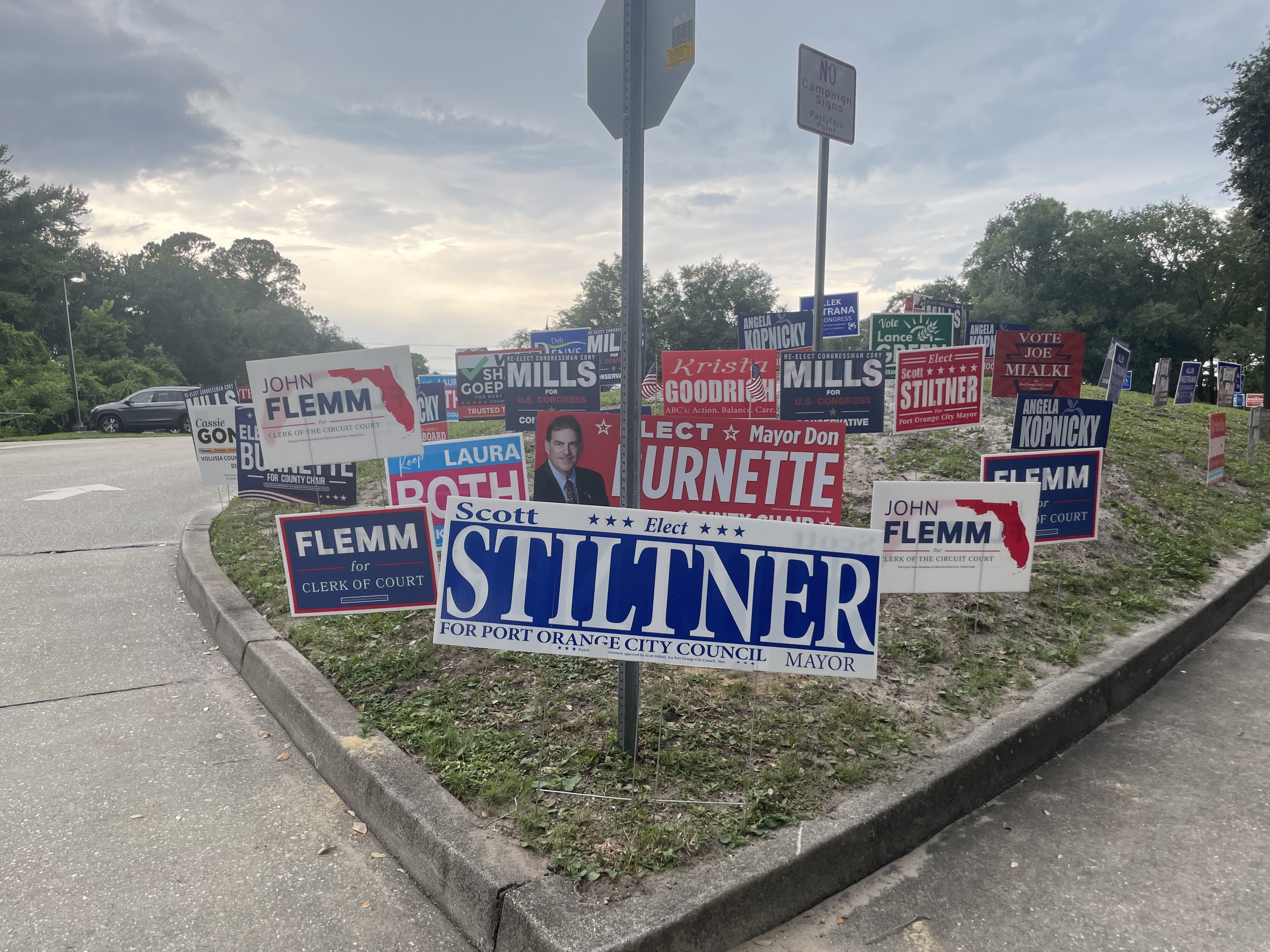
Campaign signs in Port Orange, 2024

=== Elected officials ===
Name	District	Term ends	Citations
Scott Stiltner	Mayor	December 2028	
Jonathan Foley	District 1	December 2026	
Tracy Grubbs	District 2 & Vice Mayor	December 2026	
Shawn Goepfert	District 3	December 2028	
Lance Green	District 4	December 2026	

== Notable people ==
- Vince Carter, NBA player
- Adam Cianciarulo, professional Motocross racer
- Charles Dougherty (Florida politician)
- Marci Gonzalez, ABC news reporter WABC-TV New York City
- Danielle Harris, actress
- Austin Hays, MLB outfielder
- Bobby Kennedy, NASCAR driver
- Ryan Lochte, Olympic gold medalist
- Mark Martin, NASCAR driver
- Dan Pardus, NASCAR driver
- Mike Skinner, NASCAR driver

== Transportation ==
=== Airports ===
- The Daytona Beach International Airport is the nearest major airport.
- New Smyrna Beach Municipal Airport is the closest airport to Port Orange.
- Spruce Creek Airport is a private community airport.

=== Major Roads ===
- I-95 (SR 9 / Interstate 95) is the main north–south interstate highway along the east coast of the state. The sole interchange for Port Orange is at Exit 256, also known as Florida State Road 421 (see below).
- US 1 (SR 5 / Ridgewood Avenue) is the main local road through Port Orange, running north–south. It served as the main north–south highway in the state and the eastern half of the county until I-95 was built. The route enters the city from the south at Spruce Creek Park near New Smyrna Beach and leaves at the border with South Daytona.
- SR A1A (Port Orange Causeway / South Atlantic Avenue)
- SR 5A (Nova Road)
- SR 421 (Taylor Road / Dunlawton Avenue)
- SR 441 (South Peninsula Drive)

=== Railroad ===
The main railroad line through Port Orange is the Florida East Coast Railway. Port Orange contained a separate passenger and freight station along Dunlawton Avenue which were merged together, in 1924. Passenger service ended in Port Orange in 1932, though it continued as a flag stop until the long strike of 1963. Freight service ended in 1964 when railroads shifted freight operations more within yards rather than freight stations.

Freight service continues to operate along the Florida East Coast Railway, but makes no stops within Port Orange.

=== Public transportation ===
Port Orange is served by several bus routes operated by VOTRAN. The #4 & #17 offer Sunday and night service.
