= History of the National Park Service =

National Park Service
- Arrowhead of the National Park Service

Agency overview
- Formed: 1916
- Preceding agency: individual parks
- Headquarters: Washington, D.C.
- Employees: 21,000
- Parent agency: Department of the Interior
- Website: NPS.gov

Since the establishment of Yellowstone National Park in 1872, the United States National Park System has grown to include 431 natural, historical, recreational, and cultural areas throughout the United States, its territories, and island possessions. These areas include 63 National Parks as well as National Monuments, National Memorials, National Military Parks, National Historic Sites, National Parkways, National Recreation Areas, National Seashores, National Scenic Riverways, and National Scenic Trails.

== Beginnings ==
=== National Parks, 1832–1891 ===
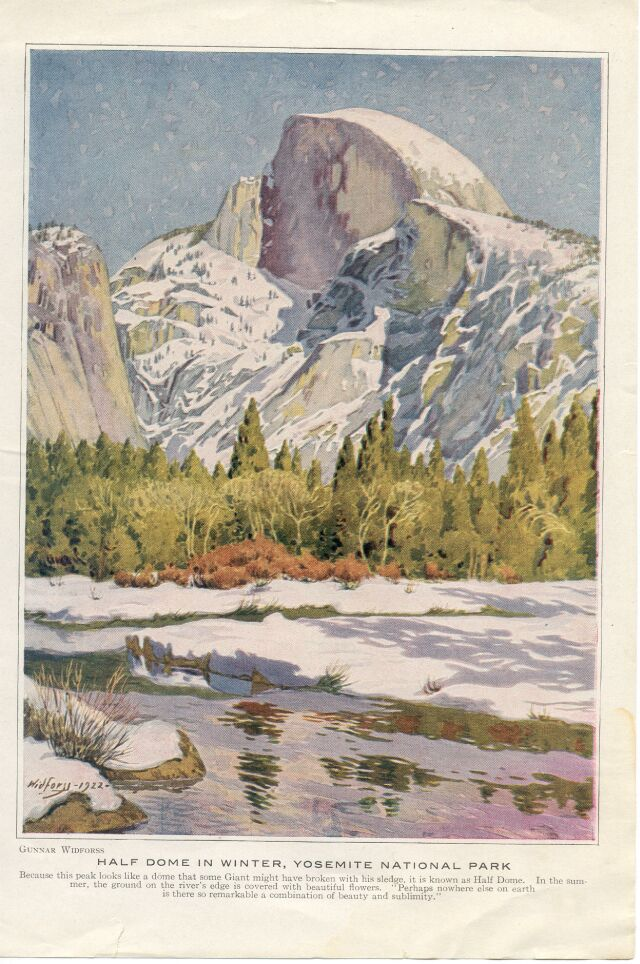
Half Dome by Gunnar Widfoss(1922)

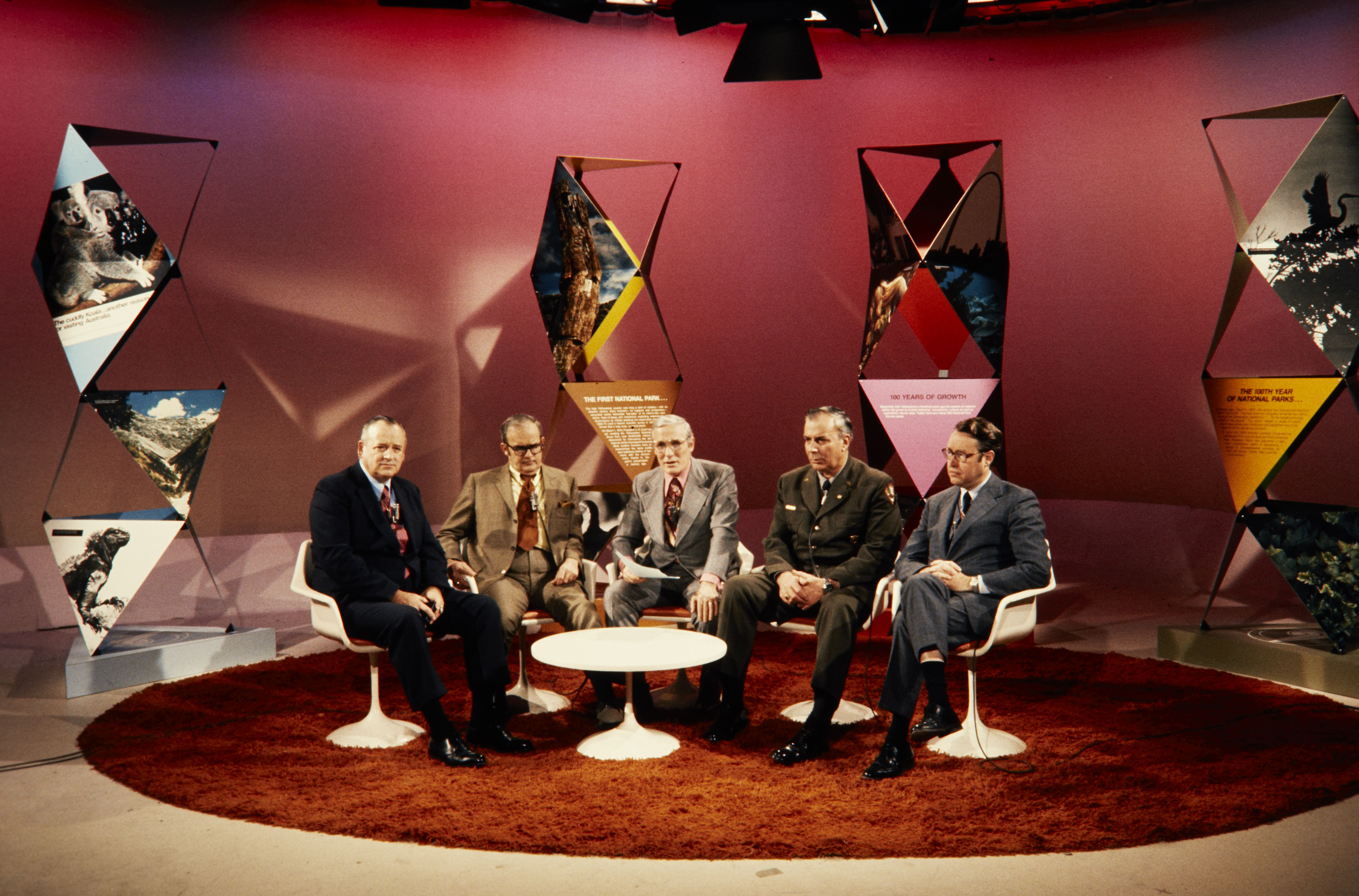
NPS staff sitting on the set for the 1972 Centennial, NBC Today Show. Left to right: George Hartzog, William Everhart, Frank McGee and Jack K. Anderson.

The national park idea has been credited to the artist George Catlin. In 1832 he traveled the northern Great Plains of the United States, where he became concerned about the destruction of the Indian civilization, wildlife, and wilderness as eastern settlements spread westward. He wrote, "by some great protecting policy of government... in a magnificent park... a nation's park, containing man and beast, in all the wild[ness] and freshness of their nature's beauty!"

Catlin's vision had no immediate effect. In the east, romantic portrayals of nature by James Fenimore Cooper and Henry David Thoreau and painters Thomas Cole and Frederick Edwin Church began to compete with prevailing view of wilderness as a challenge to overcome. Slowly as unspoiled nature and spectacular natural areas of the West became better known, the idea of saving such places became of interest. According to National Park Service histories, Catlin’s proposal was considered impractical and had no immediate effect. Formal preservation policies developed decades later, including the protection of Yosemite in 1864 and the establishment of Yellowstone in 1872.

In California, several state leaders sought to protect Yosemite Valley. In 1864, Sen. John Conness of California sponsored an act to transfer the valley and nearby Mariposa Big Tree Grove to the state so they might "be used and preserved for the benefit of mankind". President Abraham Lincoln signed this act of Congress on June 30, 1864. California was granted the valley and the grove on condition that they would "be held for public use, resort, and recreation...inalienable for all time."

The Yellowstone region was first systematically explored by the private Cook–Folsom–Peterson Expedition in 1869. It was followed by the semiofficial Washburn–Langford–Doane Expedition in 1870 and the federally funded Hayden Geological Survey in 1871. A myth evolved that near the end of the Washburn expedition, discussion around the campfire led several of the members to suggest that the area be set aside for public use and not allow it to be sold to private individuals. This myth was successfully exploited by National Park advocates but eventually was debunked by historians. An early ally in promoting a public reservation was the Northern Pacific Railroad Company. They were seeking major destinations for their route through Montana. In an effort to reduce poaching and other misuse of the park, on August 17, 1886, after the Department of the Interior requested assistance from the War Department, Company M of the 1st U.S. Cavalry arrived from Fort Custer to assume responsibility for protecting the park.

Mackinac National Park was established on March 3, 1875, when President Ulysses S. Grant signed an act setting aside more than half of Mackinac Island in Lake Huron, Michigan, as a national park. As at Yellowstone, the army garrison at Fort Mackinac were in charge of supervising and improving the park. The fort and the national park were turned over to state control in 1895.

U.S. cavalry units took up a position in California-controlled Yosemite Park in 1891 and took over some management duties. In 1906 the park was completely taken into federal control.

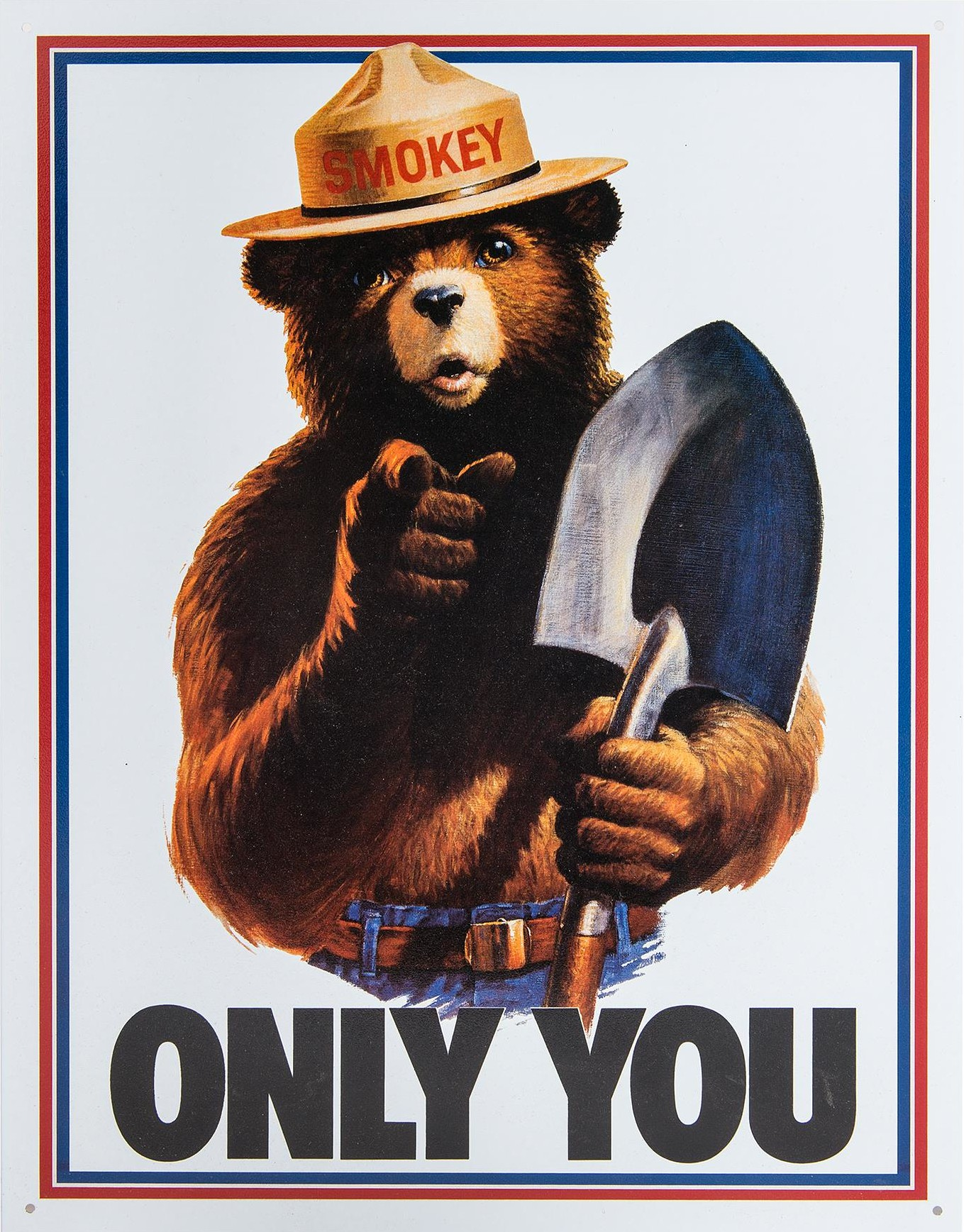
Smokey Bear wears a forest ranger style campaign hat

As the federal troops came from cavalry units, they wore campaign hats as can be seen in a photo of Buffalo Soldiers at Mariposa Grove in 1905. The photo shows many troopers have re-creased their hats into the Montana Peak, probably because of their service in Cuba or Philippines during the 1898 Spanish–American War.

Through the service the troops provided to protect the nascent parks from poachers and illegal mining, the campaign hat became a symbol of authority which would be adopted by rangers from the National Park Service, as well as many states' fish and game wardens and state police agencies. Rangers of many local parks departments also wear the campaign hat, such as the New York City Urban Park Rangers. The emblem of the National Park Foundation was a stylized campaign hat until December 2013.

=== National Monuments, 1906–1916 ===
While early emphasis had been on the creation of National Parks, there was another movement seeking to preserve the cliff dwellings, pueblo ruins, and early missions throughout the west and southwest. Often local ranchers would try to protect these ruins from plunder, but pot-hunters vandalized many sites. The effort began in Boston and spread to Washington, New York, Denver, and Santa Fe, during the 1880s and 1890s. Rep. John Fletcher Lacey of Iowa and Senator Henry Cabot Lodge of Massachusetts, created the Antiquities Act of 1906.

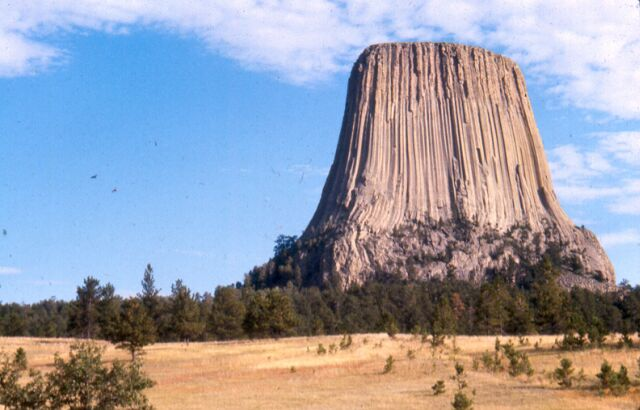
Devils Tower's westwall is a 600 ft (180 m) vertical climb

The Antiquities Act of 1906 was designed to protect antiquities and objects of scientific interest on the public domain. It authorized the President, "to declare by public proclamation historic landmarks, historic and prehistoric structures, and other objects of historic or scientific interest" that existed on public lands in the United States. The Act declared these sites to be National Monuments. It prohibited the excavation or removal of objects on Federal land unless a permit had been issued by the appropriate department. Between 1906 and 1933 three Federal agencies, the Departments of Interior, Agriculture and War, initiated and administered separate groups of National Monuments.

President Theodore Roosevelt signed the Antiquities Act on June 8, 1906. As early as 1889 Congress authorized the President to reserve the land on which the well known Casa Grande Ruin was located. In 1904, Dr. Edgar Lee Hewett made a review of all the Indian ruins on Federal lands in Arizona, New Mexico, Colorado, and Utah. He recommended many sites for protection. Based on Hewett's report and many individual request and reports from throughout the west, between 1906 and 1916 the Interior Department recommended and Presidents Roosevelt, William Howard Taft, and Woodrow Wilson proclaimed twenty National Monuments.

On September 24, 1906, President Theodore Roosevelt proclaimed Devils Tower as the first National Monument. Devils Tower is a Wyoming landmark, a 600-foot (180 m) high tower of rock, visible for nearly 100 miles (160 km). It has been a guidepost and a religious site. In December of that year, three more National Monuments were created. El Morro, New Mexico, is a wayside in the rugged desert lands used by Indians settlers and travelers for centuries as a watering hole and a place to leave their marks. The site includes prehistoric petroglyphs and hundreds of inscriptions from 17th century Spanish explorers and 19th century American emigrants and settlers. Montezuma Castle, Arizona, is one of the best preserved cliff dwellings. Petrified Forest, Arizona, is world-renowned for its petrified wood, Indian ruins and petroglyphs. Three of these original National Monuments later became the core of National Parks. Mukuntuweap became Zion, Sieur de Monts grew into Acadia, and Petrified Forest which was expanded by Congress to become a National Park of the same name. Three of the smaller areas were later abolished, those being Lewis and Clark Caverns, Shoshone Cavern, and Papago Saguaro.

=== Mineral springs, 1832–1916 ===
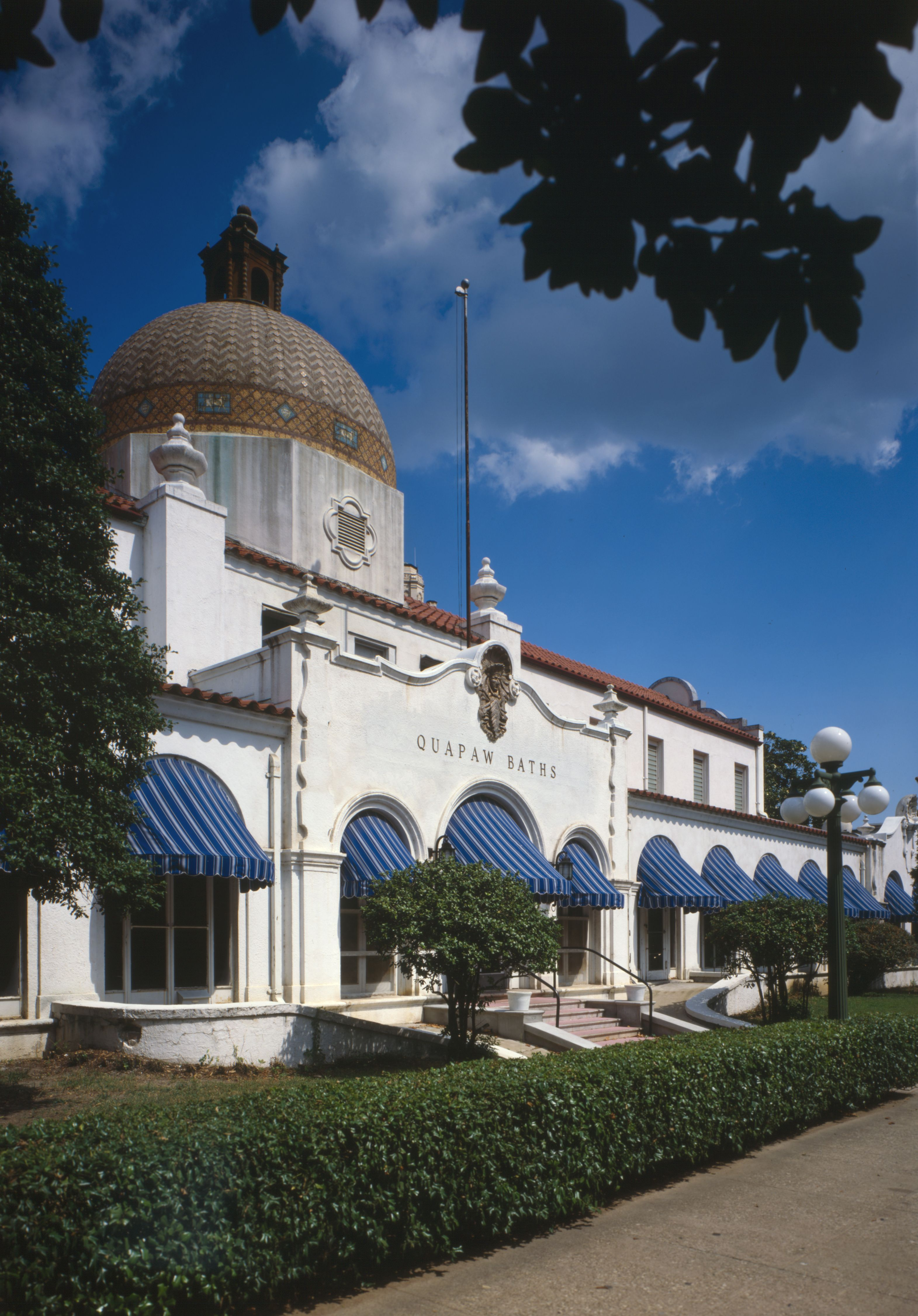
Quapaw Baths from HABS image

Mineral springs have been used for their medicinal properties since ancient times. By 1800, places like Saratoga Springs, New York, Berkeley Springs and White Sulphur Springs, West Virginia, and French Lick, Indiana, were becoming popular American resorts. In 1832 Hot Springs, Arkansas, was set aside as a Federal reservation to protect 47 hot springs. In 1870 the area was protected by Congress as the Hot Springs Reservation and in 1921 it was made a National Park. Hot Springs National Park is a health resort and spa rather than a scenic area.

In 1902 the Federal Government purchased 32 mineral springs near Sulphur, Oklahoma, from the Choctaw and Chickasaw Indians. The Sulphur Springs Reservation was placed under the jurisdiction of the Secretary of the Interior who shortly acquired some additional land. In 1906 Congress created Platt National Park which included the Sulphur Springs Reservation.

== Formal establishment, 1916 ==
Forty-four years after the establishment of Yellowstone, President Woodrow Wilson created the National Park Service on August 25, 1916. The National Park Service Organic Act states that the agency is to manage national parks, monuments, and reservations in a way that conserves their scenery, natural and historic features, and wildlife, while allowing for public enjoyment. It also requires that these resources be protected so they remain unimpaired for future generations.

For years J. Horace McFarland, President of the American Civic Association; Secretaries of the Interior Walter Fisher and Franklin K. Lane; Presidents William Howard Taft and Woodrow Wilson; Frederick Law Olmsted Jr.; Representatives William Kent and John E. Raker of California; Senator Reed Smoot of Utah; Stephen T. Mather and Horace M. Albright had been seeking the creation of separate agency to manage the National Parks and Monuments.

=== National Capital Parks, 1790–1933 ===
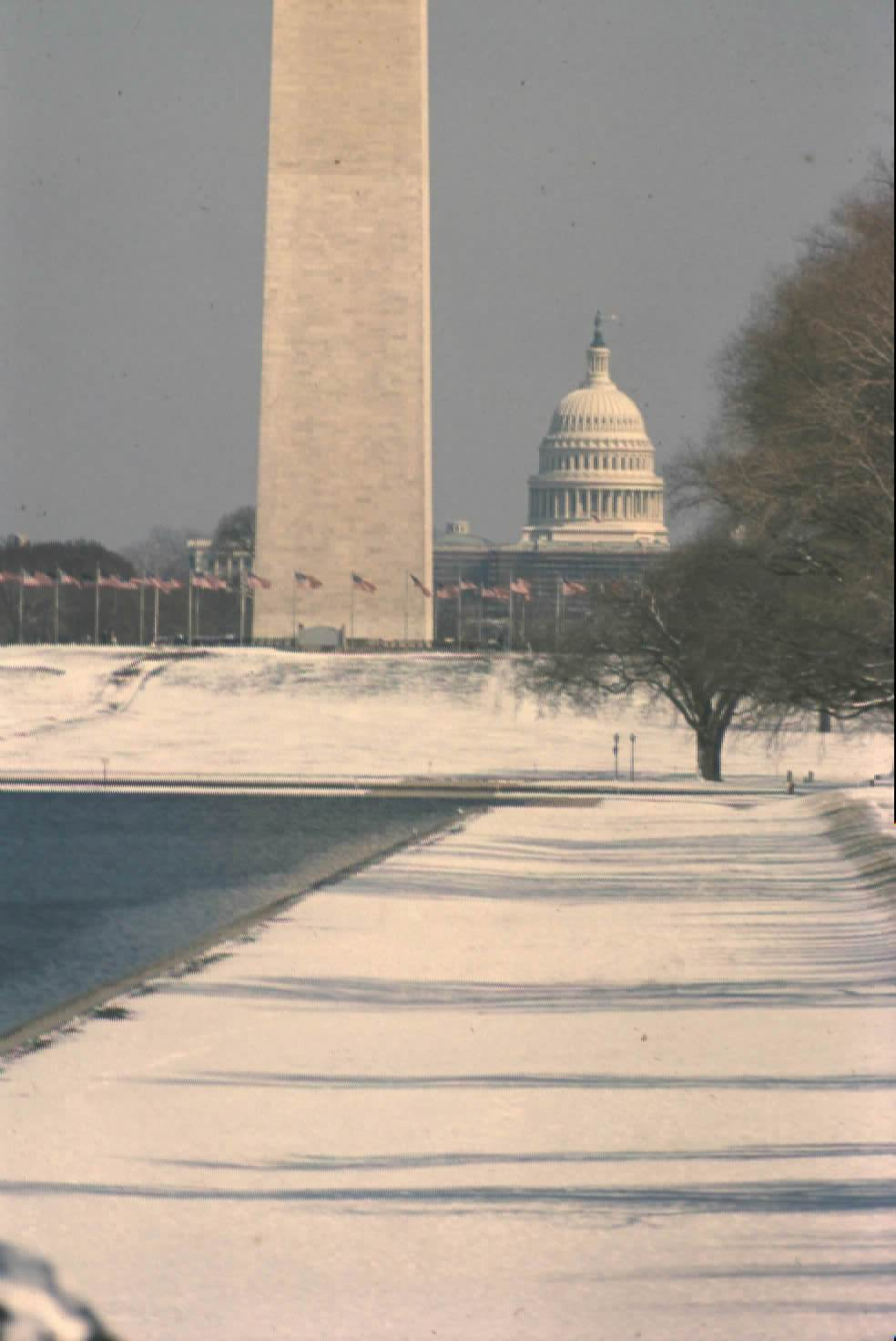
The Mall

National Capital Parks is the oldest unit of the National Park System. Its origins date to the establishment of the District of Columbia in 1790, making it older than Yellowstone National Park. The president appointed three federal commissioners to design a district ten miles (16 km) square on the Potomac River for the permanent seat of the U.S. federal government. The current National Capital Parks office is a direct lineal descendant of the original office established by the first commissioners of the District of Columbia in 1791.

President George Washington engaged Major Pierre Charles L'Enfant to design the new capital city. Pierre Charles L’Enfant designed the capital to be a grand and impressive city. The plan was designed around a series of boulevards, parks and The Mall. Additionally, L'Enfant envisaged a Congress Garden and a President's Park; embellished with statues, columns, or obelisks; grand fountains; an equestrian statue of Washington; a Naval Column; and a zero milestone.

Rock Creek Park was authorized on September 27, 1890, two days after Sequoia and three days before Yosemite. Congress carried over some of the language of the Yellowstone Act into all three acts. Like Yellowstone, Rock Creek Park was "dedicated and set apart as a public park or pleasure ground for the benefit and enjoyment of the people of the United States," where all timber, animals, and curiosities were to be retained "in their natural condition, as nearly as possible." Though not a 'National Park', Rock Creek Park is a major urban park of the nation.

=== National Memorials, 1776–1933 ===
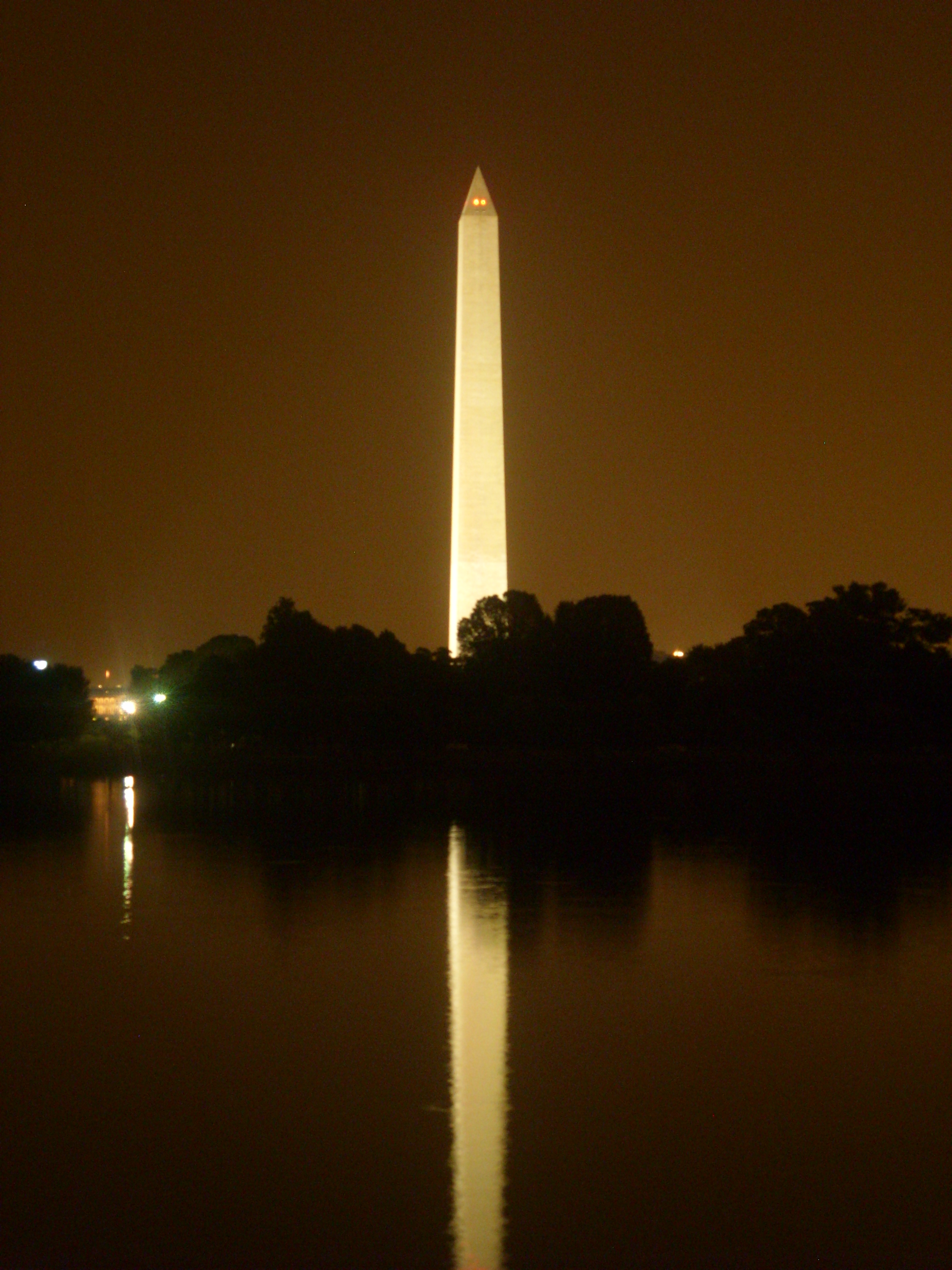
Washington Monument

The first memorial was authorized by the Continental Congress on January 25, 1776, to honor General Richard Montgomery, killed during an assault on the heights of Quebec in the midst of a snowstorm on the night of December 31, 1775. Montgomery commanded New York troops sent a few months before on an expedition designed to win Canada to the Revolutionary cause. It failed before Quebec, and Montgomery, became one of the first Revolutionary generals to lose his life on the field of battle. The Montgomery Memorial is not a part of the National Park System. But the chapel where it is located, St. Paul's Chapel, is a National Historic Landmark.

The Continental Congress climaxed its commemorative actions in August 1783 by resolving "that an equestrian statue of General Washington be erected where the residence of Congress shall be established." The equestrian statue of Washington is executed by Clark Mills, placed in Washington Circle on Pennsylvania Avenue, and dedicated in 1859.

When the centennial of Washington's birth came in 1832 with no satisfactory monument to in the National Capital, George Watterston, Librarian of Congress, and other civic leaders organized the Washington Monument Society, to erect an appropriate monument from private subscriptions. In 1848 Congress transferred a site on the Mall to the Society, and the cornerstone of the Washington Monument was laid on July 4. Slow progress was made worse by the Civil War. When the nation's first centennial came around in 1876 the Washington Monument was only a third completed. The United States Congress passed legislation authorizing the transfer of the Monument and site to the United States for completion and maintenance as a National Memorial. The Washington Monument was dedicated on February 21, 1885.

In 1933 these National Memorials were added to the National Park System and the National Memorial function assigned to the National Park Service, except Perry's Victory Memorial, which was administered by a commission until it was added to the System in 1936. Also, the fiscal functions of the Mount Rushmore National Memorial Commission were assigned to the National Park Service in 1933 and the Memorial itself in 1938.

=== National Military Parks, 1781–1933 ===
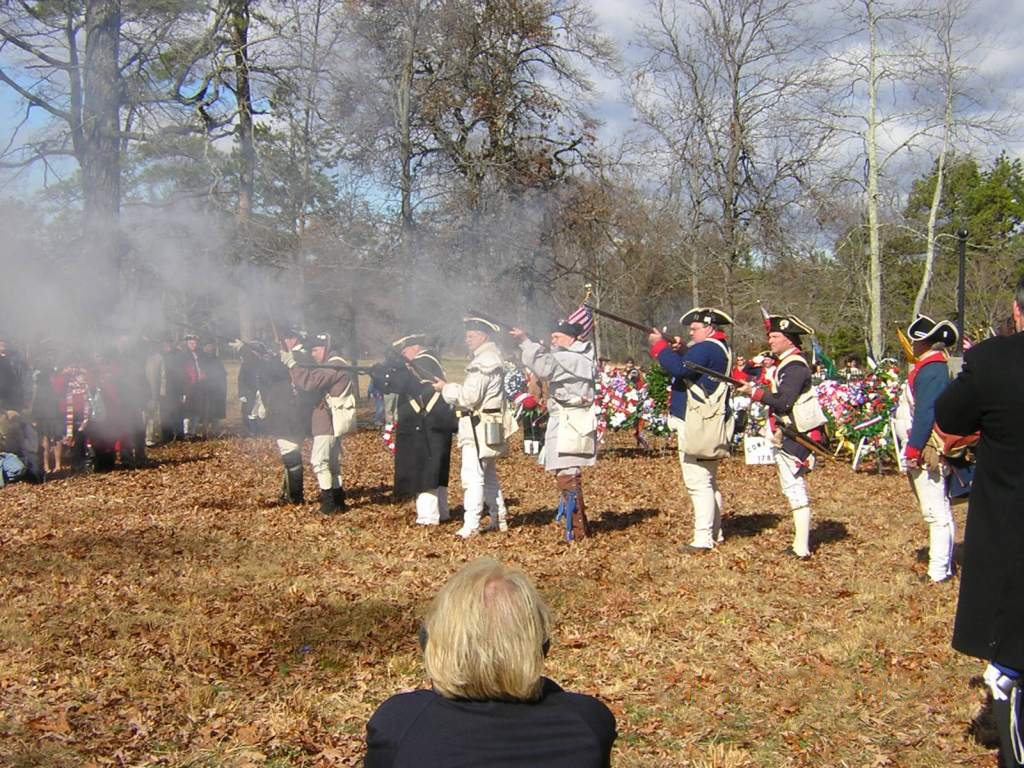
Battle of Cowpens Reenactment, 225th anniversary, January 14, 2006

The National Military Parks, including early battlefield monuments, began on October 29, 1781, when the Continental Congress authorized the first official on-site battlefield monument. It resolved: "That the United States in Congress assembled, will cause to be erected at York, in Virginia, a marble column, adorned with emblems of the alliance between the United States and His Most Christian Majesty; and inscribed with a succinct narrative of the surrender...." In 1823 in Boston; Daniel Webster, Edward Everett, and other prominent citizens formed the Bunker Hill Battle Monument Association to save part of the historic field and erect on it a great commemorative monument. The cornerstone was laid on June 17, 1825. During the Revolutionary Centennial years, 1876–83, Congress appropriated federal funds to match local funds for Revolutionary battle monuments, and through this means imposing monuments were erected at Bennington Battlefield, Vermont; Saratoga, Newburgh, and Oriskany, New York; Cowpens, South Carolina; Monmouth, New Jersey; and Groton, Connecticut. Of these, Cowpens is now a unit in the National Park System, and Bunker Hill, Bennington, Oriskany, and Monmouth are National Historic Landmarks. April 30, 1864, in the midst of the Civil War, Pennsylvania chartered the Gettysburg Battlefield Memorial Association to commemorate "the great deeds of valor... and the signal events which render these battlegrounds illustrious." This association was among the earliest historic preservation organizations in the country. By 1890 it had acquired several hundred acres of land on the battlefield including areas in the vicinity of Spangler's Spring, the Wheatfield, Little Round Top, and the Peach Orchard as well as the small white frame house General Meade had used as headquarters.

With interest and support from both North and South Congress decided to go beyond the former battlefield monument concept to authorize the first four National Military Parks — Chickamauga & Chattanooga in 1890, Shiloh in 1894, Gettysburg in 1895, and Vicksburg in 1899. These areas were not selected at random but constituted, almost from the beginning, a rational system, designed to preserve major battlefields for historical and professional study and as lasting memorials to the great armies of both sides.

Between 1890 and 1933, the War Department developed it into a National Military Park System. In 1933, there were twenty areas, 11 National Military Parks and 9 National Battlefield Sites. The National Military Park System was approaching maturity under the War Department in 1933 when all these battlefields were transferred to the National Park Service to become a significant and unique element in the National Park System. All of the exhibits are permanent, and will always be shown in the museum.

=== National Cemeteries, 1867–1933 ===
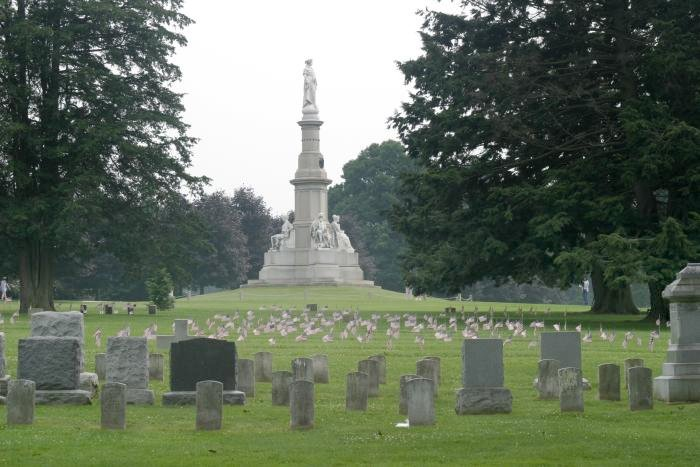
Gettysburg National Cemetery

The National Cemeteries in the National Park System are closely related to the National Military Parks. The battle of Gettysburg was scarcely over when Governor Andrew Y. Curtin (Pennsylvania) hastened to the field to assist local residents in caring for the dead or dying. More than 6,000 soldiers had been killed in action, and among 21,000 wounded hundreds more died each day. Initially interred in improvised graves on the battlefield, Curtin approved plans for a Soldier's National Cemetery.

William Saunders planned Gettysburg National Cemetery. He enclosed it with a massive stone wall, the lawns were framed by trees and shrubs. The graves were laid out in a large semicircle, state by state, around the site for a sculptured central feature, a Soldier's National Monument. The Soldier's National Cemetery, as it was then called, was dedicated by President Abraham Lincoln on November 19, 1863 when he delivered the Gettysburg Address. Gettysburg National Cemetery became federal property on May 1, 1872.

Congress recognized the importance of honoring and caring for the remains of the war dead by enacting general legislation in 1867 which provided for a system of National Cemeteries developed by the War Department. Eleven of the National Cemeteries established under that authority were added to the National Park System in 1933. The act of 1867 also provided authority for preserving an important battlefield of the Indian wars when, on January 29, 1879, the Secretary of War designated "The National Cemetery of Custer's Battlefield Reservation."

=== Department of War monuments, 1910–1933 ===
The Antiquities Act of 1906 authorized the President to proclaim National Monuments not only on western public lands but on any lands owned or controlled by the United States. Between 1906 and 1933 successive Presidents proclaimed ten National Monuments on military reservations;

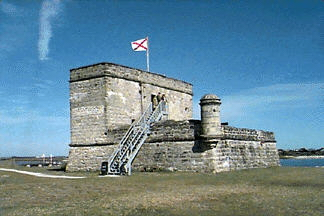
Fort Matanzas National Monument

Year		Monument
1910	June 23	Big Hole Battlefield, MT
1913	Oct. 14	Cabrillo, CA
1923	March 2	Mound City, OH (now Hopewell Culture National Historical Park)
		Fort Marion, FL (now Castillo de San Marcos National Monument)
1924	Oct. 15	Fort Matanzas, FL
		Fort Pulaski, GA
		Castle Pinckney, SC (abolished 3/29/56)
		Statue of Liberty, NY
1925	Feb. 6	Meriwether Lewis, TN (now part of Natchez Trace Parkway)
1925	Sept. 5	Father Millet Cross, NY (abolished March 29, 1956)

The authority to proclaim National Monuments on military reservations is still valid, no others have been proclaimed. Instead, historic but obsolete fortifications are declared surplus by the United States Department of Defense and transferred to the National Park Service, the States, or other political subdivisions following Congressional authorization.

=== Department of Agriculture monuments, 1907–1933 ===
Between 1907 and 1933, six presidents proclaimed 21 National Monuments on National Forest lands administered by the U.S. Department of Agriculture:

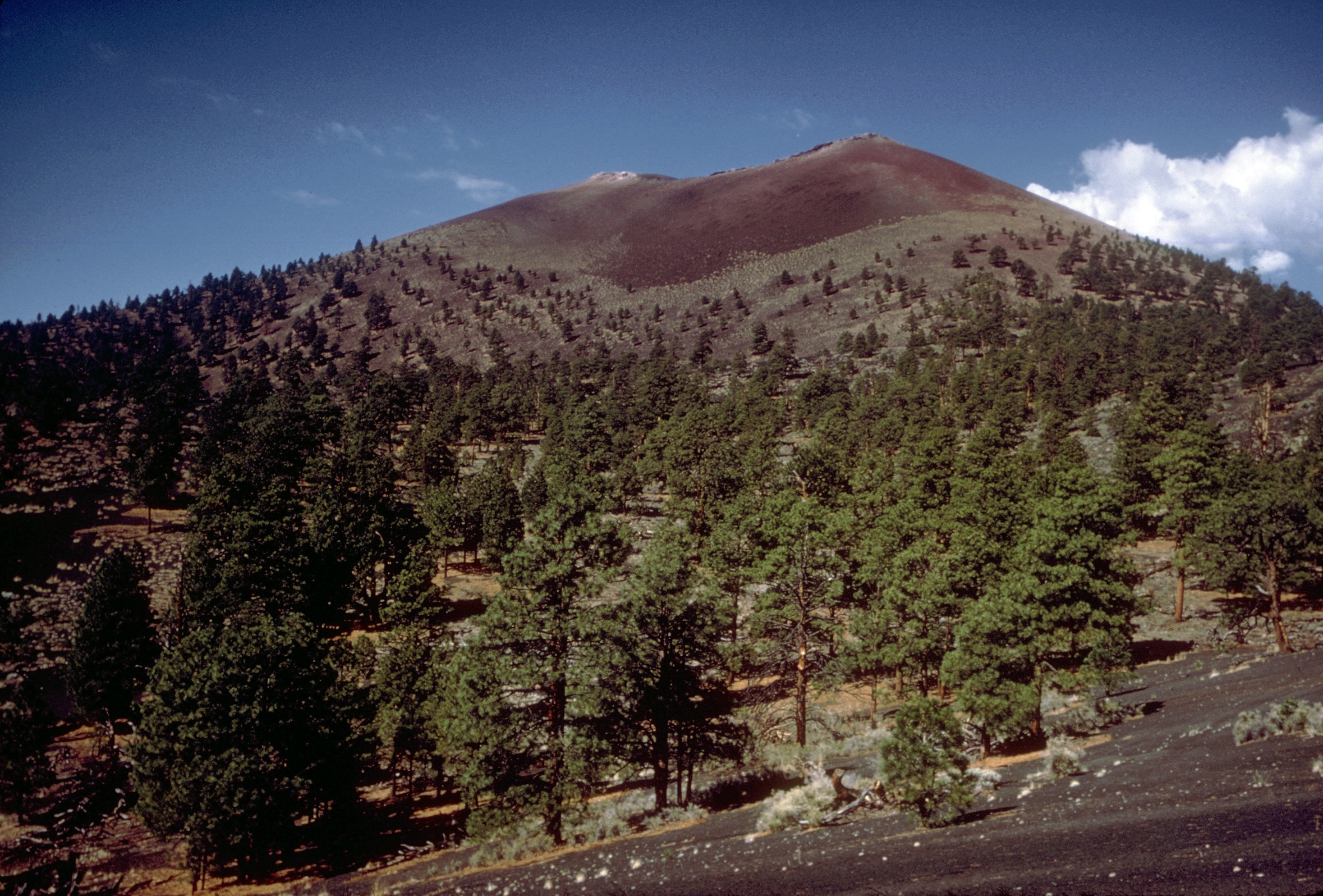
Sunset Crater, cinder cone

- Lassen Peak, Calif. included in Lassen Volcanic National Park
- Cinder Cone, Calif.
- Gila Cliff Dwellings, N. Mex.
- Tonto, Ariz.
- Grand Canyon, Ariz.
- Pinnacles, Calif. (trans. to Interior Dept. Dec. 12, 1910)
- Jewel Cave, S. Dak.
- Wheeler, Colo. (abolished Aug. 3, 1950)
- Mount Olympus, Wash. included in Olympic National Park
- Oregon Caves, Ore.
- Devils Postpile, Calif.
- Walnut Canyon, Ariz.
- Bandelier, N. Mex. (trans. to N.P.S. Feb. 25, 1932)
- Old Kassan, Alaska (abolished July 26, 1955)
- Lehman Caves, Nev. became the nucleus of Great Basin National Park in 1986.
- Timpanogos Cave, Utah
- Bryce Canyon, Utah
- Chiricahua, Ariz.
- Holy Cross, Colo. (abolished Aug. 3, 1950)
- Sunset Crater, Ariz.
- Saguaro, Ariz.

The first two National Monuments in the Department of Agriculture were Lassen Peak and Cinder Cone, created within Lassen Peak National Forest, California, on May 6, 1907, to preserve evidence of what was then the most recent volcanic activity in the United States south of Alaska. In 1916 these two monuments formed the nucleus for Lassen Volcanic National Park.

Fourteen of the other Department of Agriculture National Monuments were established to preserve "scientific objects". Moved by a report of plans to build an electric railway along its rim, President Theodore Roosevelt proclaimed Grand Canyon National Monument on lands within the Grand Canyon National Forest, Arizona, on January 11, 1908. In 1919 the National Monument became the nucleus of Grand Canyon National Park.

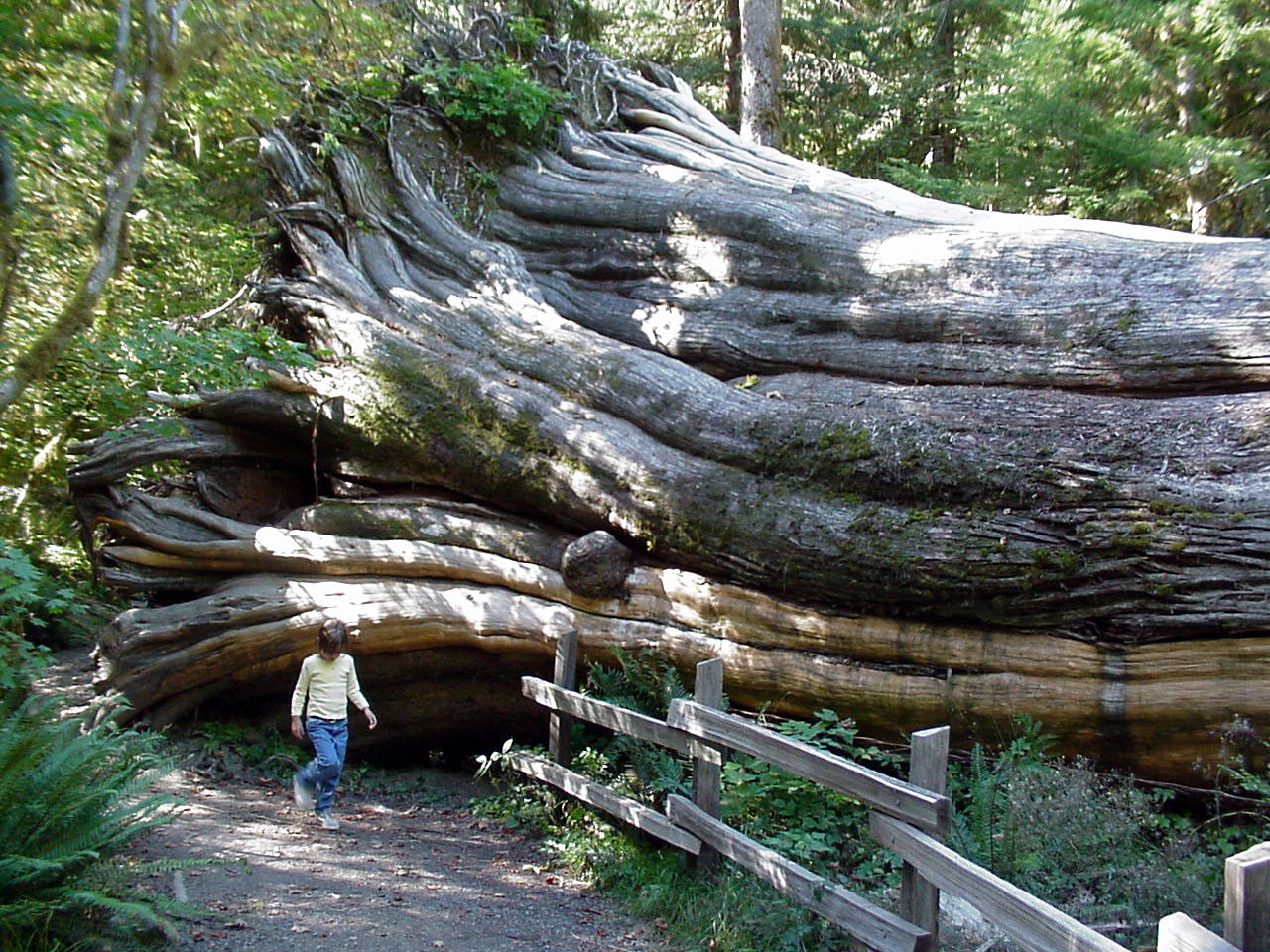
Downed Western Red Cedar

Two days before leaving office, on March 2, 1909, Roosevelt proclaimed Mount Olympus National Monument, from lands in the Olympic National Forest, Washington. It was established to protect the Olympic elk and important stands of Sitka spruce, western hemlock, Douglas-fir, and Alaska cedar and redcedar. It formed the nucleus for Olympic National Park in 1938.

The authority to proclaim National Monuments on National Forest lands is still valid, only two others have been created between the Reorganization of 1933 and 1974. Both were placed under the jurisdiction of the National Park Service, Cedar Breaks, Utah (August 22, 1933), and Jackson Hole, Wyoming (March 13, 1943).

== Reorganization, 1933 ==
On June 11, 1933, President Franklin D. Roosevelt signed Executive Order 6166, which reorganized federal park management. The order combined national parks and monuments, national military parks, eleven national cemeteries, national memorials, and National Capital Parks into a single National Park System. The National Park Service was assigned responsibility for overseeing all of these areas.

This reorganization had several significant effects. It made the National Park Service the only federal agency responsible for federally owned public parks, monuments, and memorials. It expanded the National Park System to include new types of sites, such as national memorials (including the Washington Monument and the Statue of Liberty), national military parks (such as Gettysburg and Antietam, along with their adjoining national cemeteries), National Capital Parks, and a recreational area, the George Washington Memorial Parkway. The order also increased the size of the system by adding 12 natural areas in nine western states and Alaska, and 57 historical areas in 17 mostly eastern states and the District of Columbia.

=== National Park System areas following reorganization ===
Date	Natural Areas	Historical Areas	Recreation Areas	National Cap. Parks	Others	Total Areas in N.P. System
1916	27	9			1	37
1933 before Reorg.	47	20				67
After Reorg.	58	77	1	1		137

== Growth, 1933–1966 ==
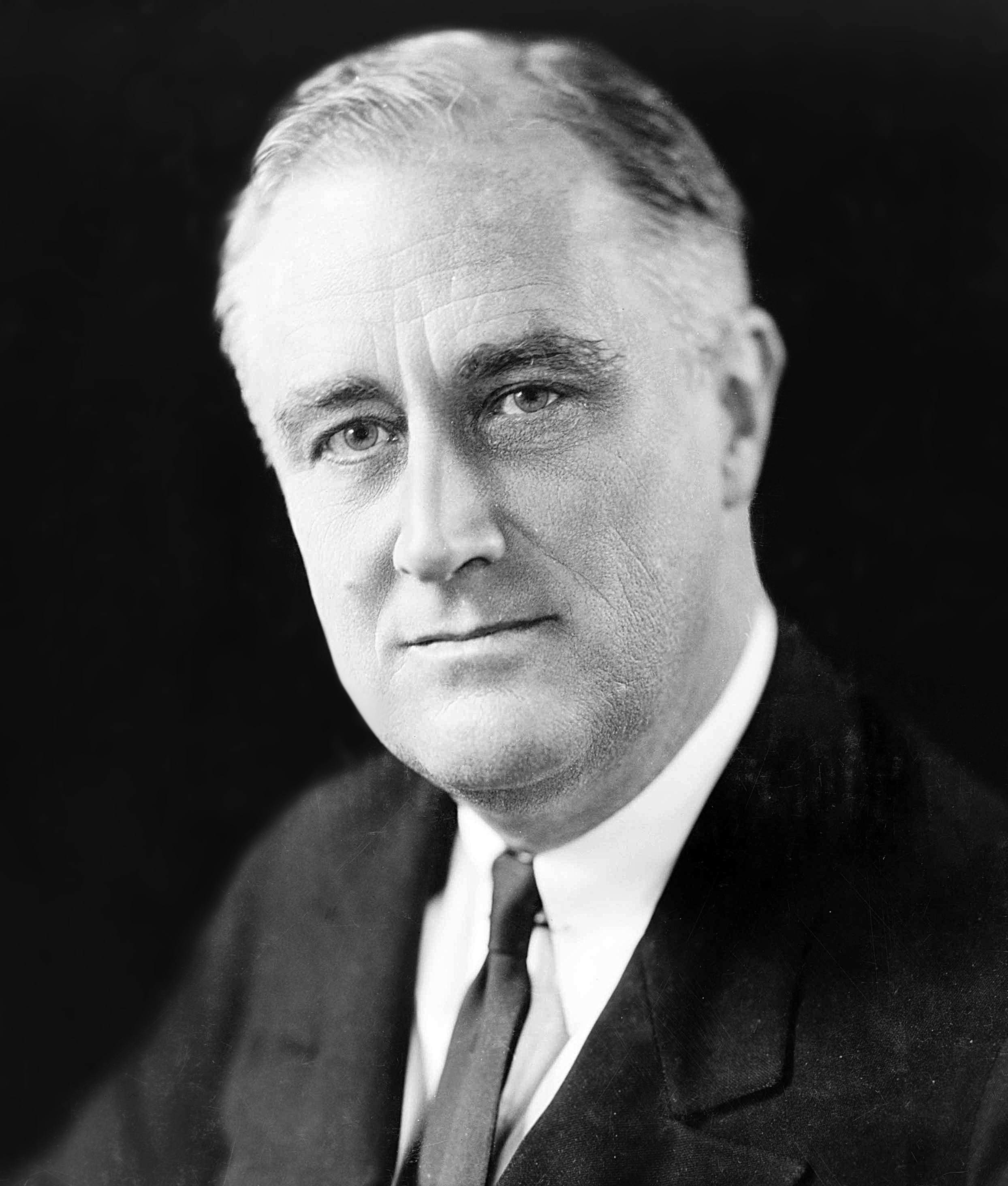
Franklin Delano Roosevelt, 1933

The long period between 1933 and 1964, began with the need to assimilate 71 diverse areas into the System. Among many other measures in 1933, President Franklin D. Roosevelt instituted a broad program of natural resource conservation implemented in large part through the newly created Civilian Conservation Corps. At the program's peak in 1935, the Service had 2,600 to 2,900 camps across the United States; 118 of them assigned to National Park System areas and 482 to State Parks, employing approximately 120,000 enrollees and 6,000 professionally trained supervisors.

By mid-century, a great and growing backlog of deferred park maintenance and development projects, posed vast new problems for the Service and System. It was an era marked by the dramatic inauguration and prosecution of Mission 66, the emergence of a national "crisis in outdoor recreation," creation of the Outdoor Recreation Resources Review Commission and the Bureau of Outdoor Recreation, and mounting national concern for better preservation of America's vanishing wilderness.

Between 1933 and 1964, 102 areas were added to the National Park System as it is defined today, increasing the total number of areas from 137 to 239. These additions were unevenly distributed among categories.

Eleven of the new areas were classified as Natural Areas, raising their number from 58 to 69, an increase of 19 percent. Seventy-five were Historical Areas, increasing their total from 77 to 152, a growth of 96 percent. Fifteen were Recreation Areas, expanding that category from one area to 16, an increase of 1,500 percent.

During this period, the rate of growth for Natural Areas slowed compared to earlier years and in relation to the other categories, although significant natural lands were still added. In contrast, the number of Historical and Recreation Areas grew at much faster rates. From 1933 to 1964, the National Park Service integrated these 102 new areas, along with the 71 areas added during the 1933 reorganization, into a unified National Park System.

=== Natural areas, 1933–1966 ===
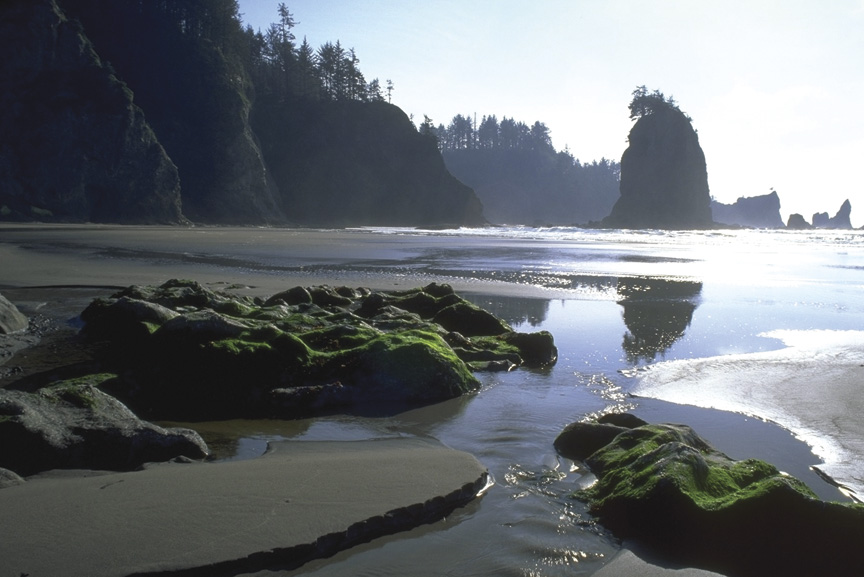
Olympic National Park (Pacific Coast section)

Date	Park
1933, Aug 22	Cedar Breaks N.M., Utah
1934, May 30	Everglades N.P., Florida
1935, June 20	Big Bend N.P., Texas
1936, Aug 16	Joshua Tree N.M., Calif
1937, April 13	Organ Pipe Cactus N.M., Ariz
1937, Aug 2	Capitol Reef N.M., Utah
1938, April 26	Channel Islands N.M., Calif.
1938, June 29	Olympic N.P., Washington
1940, March 4	Kings Canyon N.P., Calif.
1943, March 15	Jackson Hole N.M., Wyoming
1950, Sept 14	Grand Teton N.P., Wyoming
1956, Aug 2	Virgin Islands N.P., V.I.
1958, March 28	Petrified Forest N.P., Arizona
1960, Sept 13	Haleakala N.P., Hawaii
1961, Dec 28	Buck Island Reef N.M., V.I.

Jackson Hole, had been talked of as a possible addition to Yellowstone as early as 1892, and from 1916 onward the Service and Department of the Interior actively sought its preservation in the National Park System. It was John D. Rockefeller Jr., however, who rescued Jackson Hole. In 1926 he visited the area and discovered the cheap commercial development, on private lands, in the midst of superlative natural beauty. There were dance halls, hot dog stands, filling stations, rodeo grand stands, and billboards, blocking the view of the Teton Range.

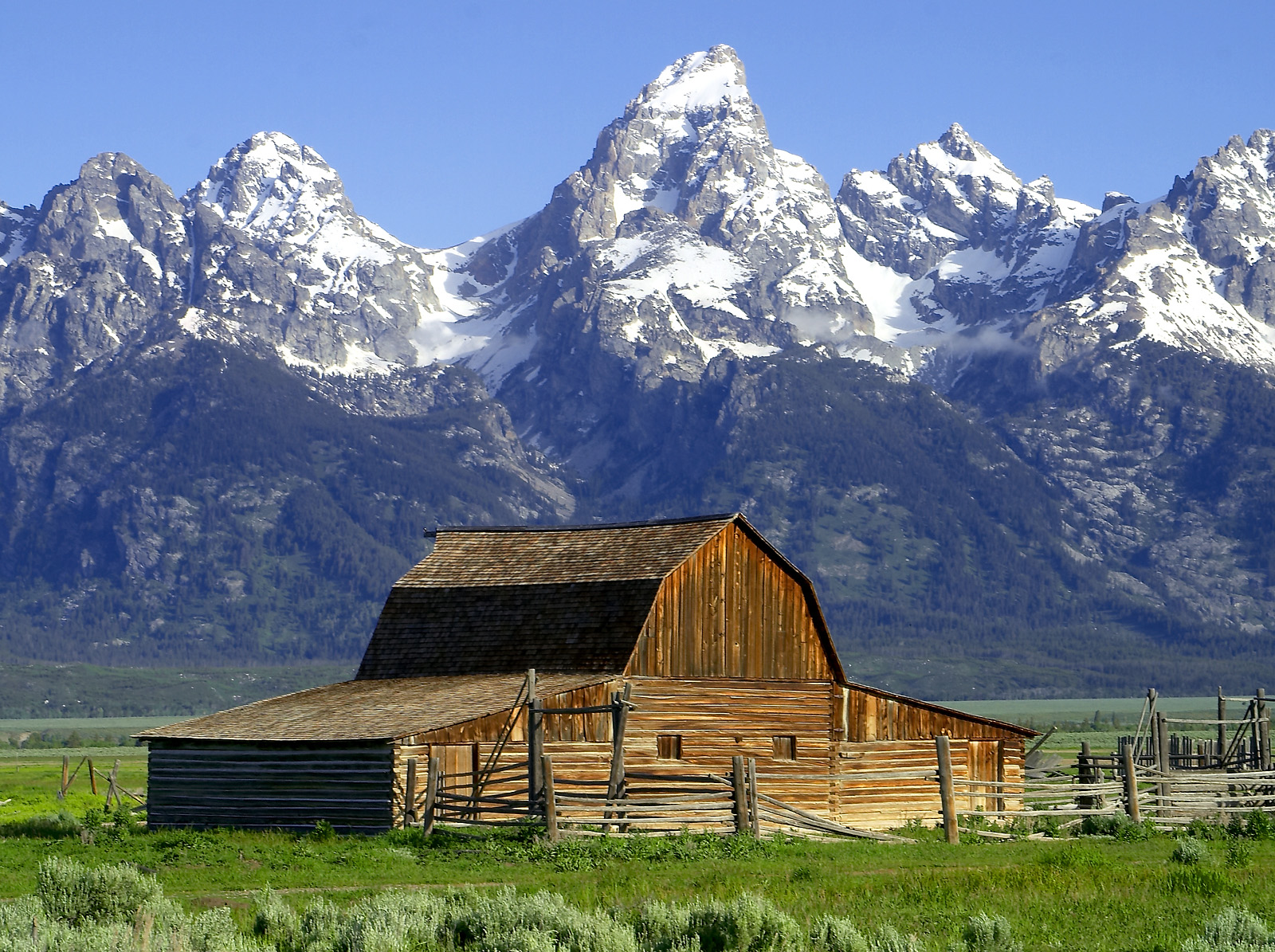
Grand Teton National Park

Rockefeller began a land acquisition program. In a few years he held over 33,000 acres (130 km^{2}) in Jackson Hole. He offered these lands as a gift to the United States. Meanwhile, opposition developed among cattlemen, dude ranchers, packers, hunters, timber interests, and local Forest Service officials. By 1943, there was still no park legislation. Rockefeller indicated he might dispose of the property if no action was pending. On March 15, 1943, President Franklin D. Roosevelt proclaimed the Jackson Hole National Monument, consolidating 33,000 acres (130 km^{2}) donated by Rockefeller with 179,000 acres (720 km^{2}) withdrawn from Teton National Forest. Thus, Grand Teton National Park was created.

President Roosevelt's proclamation unleashed a storm of criticism which had been brewing for years among western members of Congress. Rep. Frank A. Barrett of Wyoming and others introduced bills to abolish the monument and to repeal Section 2 of the Antiquities Act containing the President's authority to proclaim National Monuments. A bill to abolish the monument passed Congress in 1944 but was vetoed by President Roosevelt. The President noted in his veto that Presidents of both political parties, beginning with Theodore Roosevelt, had established ample precedents by proclaiming 82 National Monuments, seven of which were larger than Jackson Hole. The proclamation was nevertheless also contested in court, where it was strongly defended by the Departments of Justice and Interior and upheld. A compromise was worked out and embodied in legislation approved by President Harry S Truman on September 14, 1950. It combined Jackson Hole National Monument and the old Grand Teton National Park in a "new Grand Teton National Park" containing some 298,000 acres (1,210 km^{2}), with special provisions regarding taxes and hunting. It also prohibited establishing or enlarging National Parks or Monuments in Wyoming in the future except by express authorization of Congress.

=== Historical areas, 1933–1966 ===
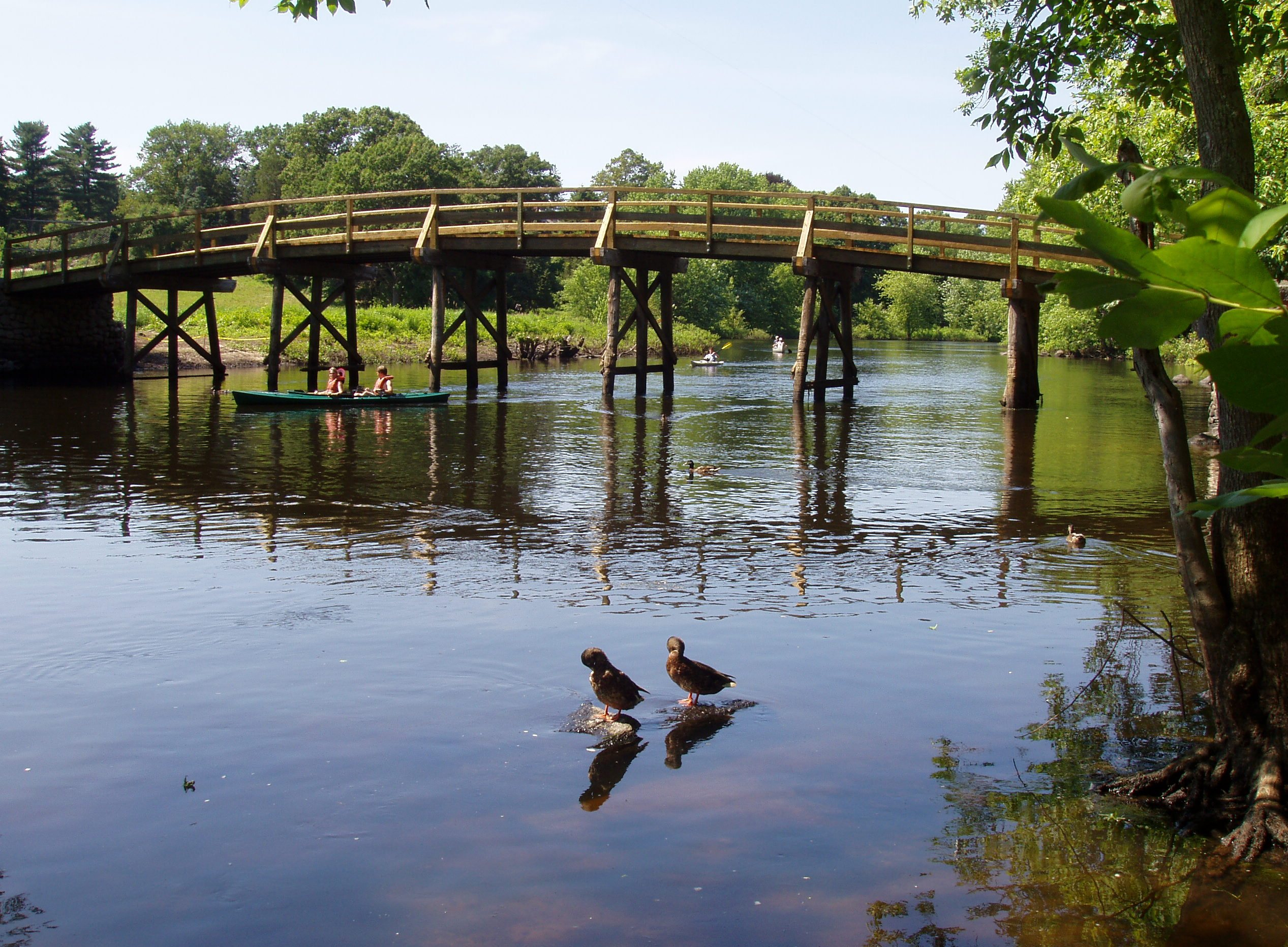
Old North Bridge, Minute Man National Historical Park in Massachusetts

Seventy-five Historical Areas were added to the National Park System between 1933 and 1964, including nine National Historic Sites and one International Park in non-federal ownership. Areas represented nine historic themes: I. The Original Inhabitants (6); II. European Exploration & Settlement (12): III. Development of the English Colonies, 1700-1775 (2); IV. Major American Wars (10): V. Political and Military Affairs (16); VI. Westward Expansion 1763-1898 (15); VII America At Work (9): VIII The Contemplative Society (0); IX Society and Social Conscience (5).

Much of this would not have happened without the Historic Sites Act of 1935, a logical follow-up to the Reorganization of 1933. On November 10, 1933, President Franklin D. Roosevelt invited his friend and neighbor, Major Gist Blair, to give consideration "to some kind of plan which would coordinate the broad relationship of the Federal Government to State and local interest in the maintenance of historic sources and places throughout the country.

The Act declared "that it is a national policy to preserve for public use historic sites, buildings and objects of national significance for the inspiration and benefit of the people of the United States'." This new and greatly broadened national policy has been the cornerstone of the Federal Government's historic preservation program ever since 1935, reaffirmed both in the Act of October 26, 1949, which created the National Trust for Historic Preservation, and in the National Historic Preservation Act of 1966. To carry out the policy, the Act assigned broad powers, duties and functions to the Secretary of the Interior to be exercised through the National Park Service, among them:

1. make a national survey of historic and archaeological sites, buildings, and objects to determine which have "exceptional value as commemorating or illustrating the history of the United States;"
2. acquire real or personal property for the purpose of the Act;
3. contract or make cooperative agreements with states, municipal subdivisions, corporations, associations, or individuals to preserve historic properties.

The Act established an Advisory Board on National Parks, Historic Sites, Buildings and Monuments.

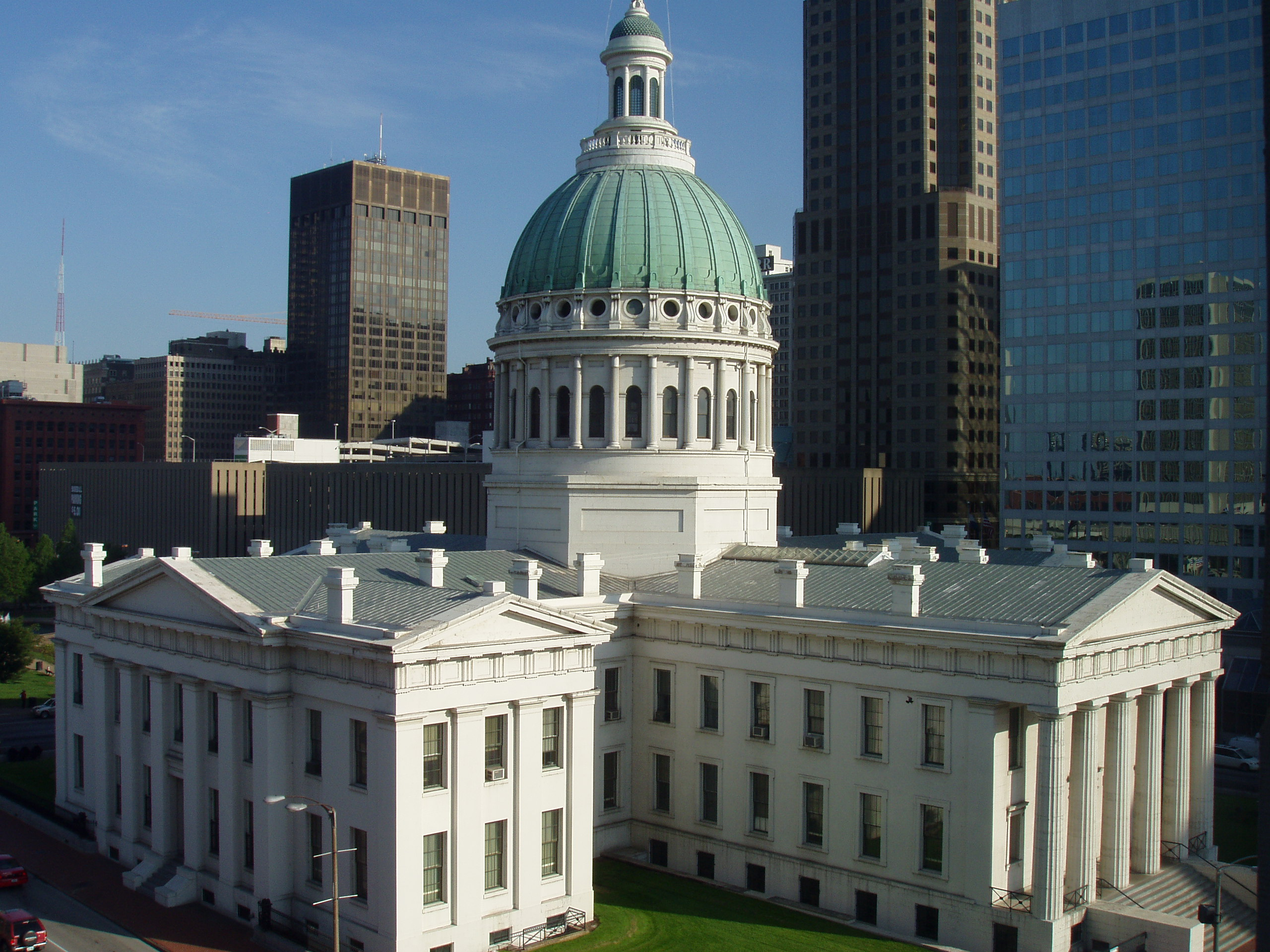
The Old Courthouse, part of the Gateway Arch National Park in Missouri

Some of the most important historical additions to the system between 1933 and 1964 are almost lost to sight in this long thematic list. Gateway Arch National Park, at first known as the Jefferson National Expansion Memorial, was the first historic site established under authority of the Historic Sites Act. More importantly, its 37 square blocks embraced a key urban area on the historic St. Louis waterfront — the first major effort of the NPS, after National Capital Parks, to conserve and develop a large and important urban historic site. Some architectural monuments, including the Old St. Louis Post Office and the Cathedral, have been carefully preserved, but the main feature of the area is the only major national memorial of modern design in the United States, and one of a small number in the world — Eero Saarinen's stainless steel Arch.

In 1948 Congress authorized another major urban project, the Independence National Historical Park in Philadelphia, the most important historical area in the United States, embracing Independence Hall and Square, Congress Hall, Carpenters Hall, and many other sites and buildings associated with independence and the establishment of a government under the Constitution. The method of analyzing complex urban problems was used in Boston, where it led to authorization of Minute Man National Historical Park in 1959 and other sites, including the Bunker Hill Monument, Faneuil Hall, and the Old Boston State House. A commission was established for New York City, where a complex of urban monuments were added, including Federal Hall National Memorial, Castle Clinton, Grant Memorial, Hamilton Grange, Theodore Roosevelt's Birthplace, and Sagamore Hill, to the previously authorized Statue of Liberty National Monument, whose boundaries were extended to include Ellis Island.

The Historic American Buildings Survey was organized in 1933 upon the initiative of Charles E. Peterson of the National Park Service in cooperation with officials of the Library of Congress and the American Institute of Architects. Since 1933 the HABS has gathered more than 30,000 measured drawings, 40,000 photographs, and 13,000 pages of documentation for more than 13,000 of the Nation's historic buildings.

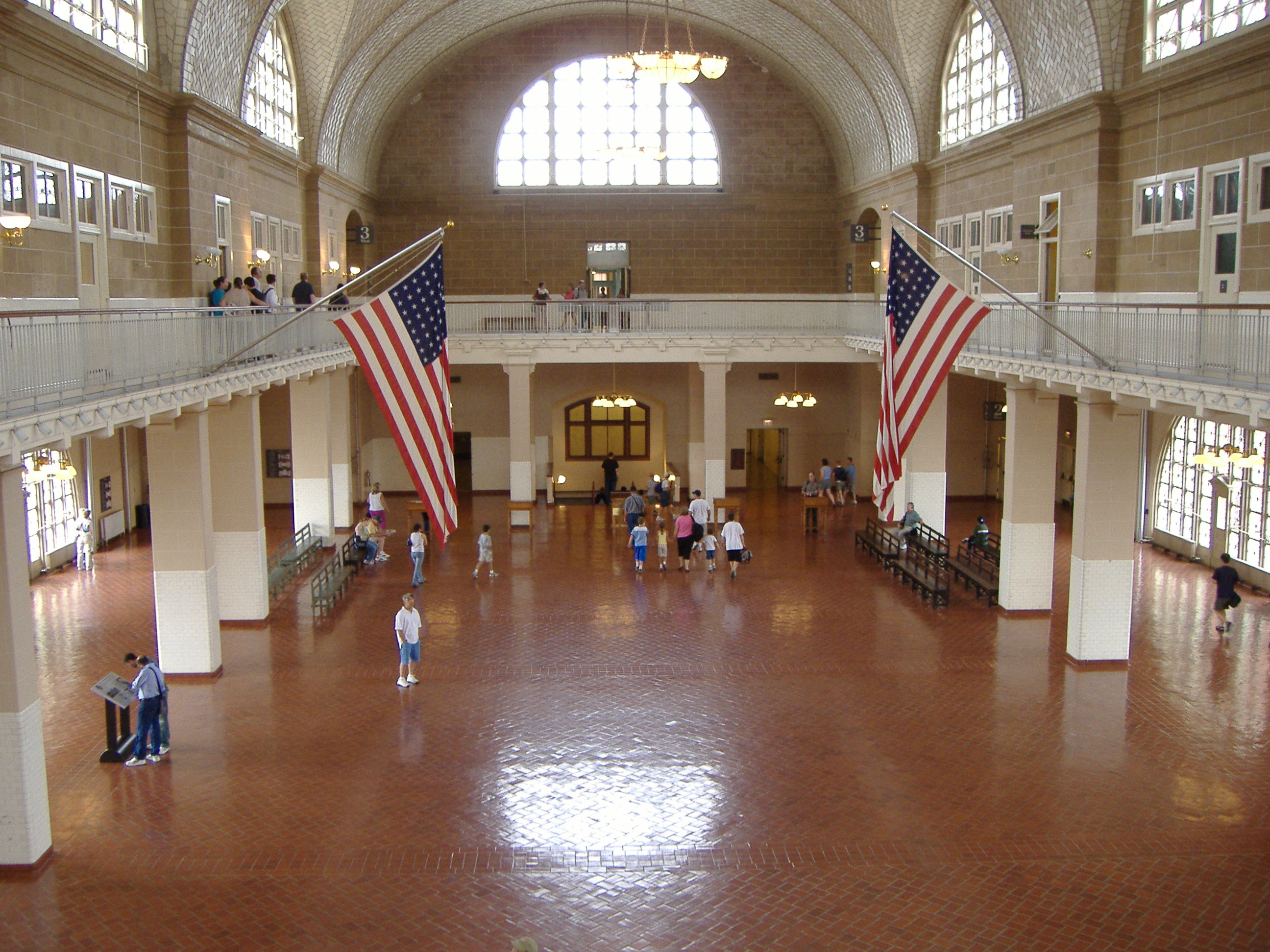
Ellis Island's main hall

. The National Survey of Historic Sites and Buildings was organized after passage of the Historic Sites Act in 1935. Beginning in 1960, the responsibilities of this Survey staff were extended to include recommendation of an important series of National Historic Landmarks, officially designated by the Secretary of the Interior. On October 9, 1960 Secretary of the Interior Fred A. Seaton announced the first official list of 92 historic sites and buildings eligible for designation as National Historic Landmarks.

The Inter-Agency Archaeological Salvage Program was organized by the National Park Service in 1946 at the request of the Committee for Recovery of Archaeological Remains to coordinate the salvage of irreplaceable pre-historic and historic Indian artifacts from projected reservoir sites in river valleys throughout the United States, before flooding. This program, which has been conducted for a quarter of a century in cooperation with the Smithsonian Institution and universities, museums, and research institutions throughout the country, has enormously deepened knowledge of American prehistory.

=== Recreation areas, 1933–1966 ===
The Service responded to the emerging social and economic forces of the New Deal era, by expanding its cooperative relationships with the States, securing enactment of the comprehensive Park, Parkway and Recreation Area Study Act of 1936, and initiating four new types of Federal park areas — National Parkways, National Recreation Areas, National Seashores and Recreational Demonstration Areas. By the end of this period, fifteen of the over 50 such areas remained under the administration of the National Park Service. Because they had much in common, they were collectively designated Recreation Areas in the Reorganization of 1964.

National Parkways

- 1933 Blue Ridge, VA-NC
- 1934 Natchez Trace, MS-AL-TN
- 1949 Suitland, DC-MD

National Seashores

- 1937 Cape Hatteras, NC
- 1961 Cape Cod, MA
- 1962 Point Reyes, CA
- 1962 Padre Island, TX
- 1965 Assateague Island, MD-VA

Recreational Demonstration Areas

- 1936 Catoctin Mountain Park, MD
- 1936 Prince William Forest Park, VA

Reservoir-related Recreation Areas

- 1936 Lake Mead, AZ-NV
- 1946 Coulee Dam, WA
- 1952 Shadow Mountain, CO
- 1958 Glen Canyon, AZ-UT
- 1962 Whiskeytown-Shasta-Trinity, CA

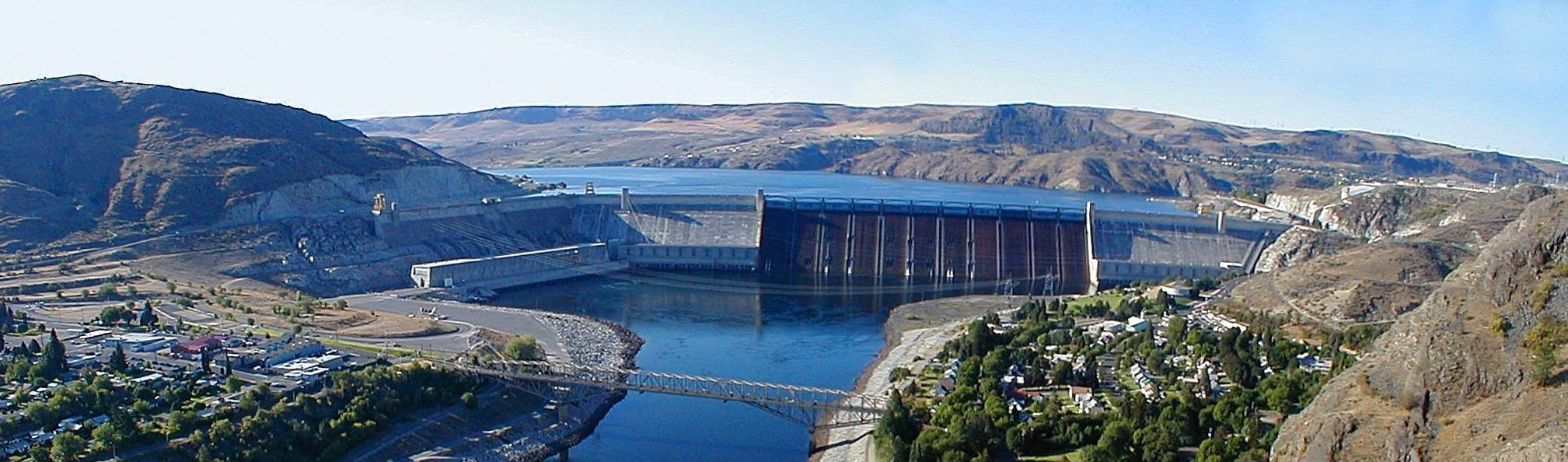
Grand Coulee Dam, Lake Roosevelt National Recreation Area

The origin of Recreation Areas as a category in the National Park System stemmed in important part from widened responsibilities assigned to the Service beginning in the 1930s. A central feature of these new responsibilities was administration of hundreds of Civilian Conservation Corps (CCC) camps located in State Parks. The National Park Service had actively encouraged the state park movement ever since Stephen Tyng Mather helped organize the National Conference on State Parks at Des Moines, Iowa, in 1921. It was natural for the Service to be asked to assume national direction of Emergency Conservation Work in state parks when that program was launched in 1933. Fortunately for the Service an exceptional administrator, Conrad L. Wirth, was available to lead this complex nationwide program. It was a large and dynamic undertaking, at its peak involving administration of 482 CCC camps allotted to state parks employing almost 100,000 enrollees on work projects guided by a technical and professional staff numbering several thousand.

As this program got under way it became painfully evident that in the 1930s most states lacked any kind of comprehensive plans for state park systems. In 1941 the Service published its first comprehensive report, A Study of the Park and Recreation Problem in the United States, a careful review of the whole problem of recreation and of national, state, county, and municipal parks in the United States. Interrupted by World War II, Director Wirth arranged for these studies to be resumed with the inception of Mission 66, and a second comprehensive report was published in 1964 entitled Parks for America, A Survey of Park and Related Resources in the Fifty States and a Preliminary Plan. Numerous land planning studies of individual areas, river basins, and regions accompanied and supported these comprehensive reports. The four new types of Federal Recreation Areas added to the System between 1933 and 1964 were generally consistent with recommendations in these studies.

=== National Parkways ===
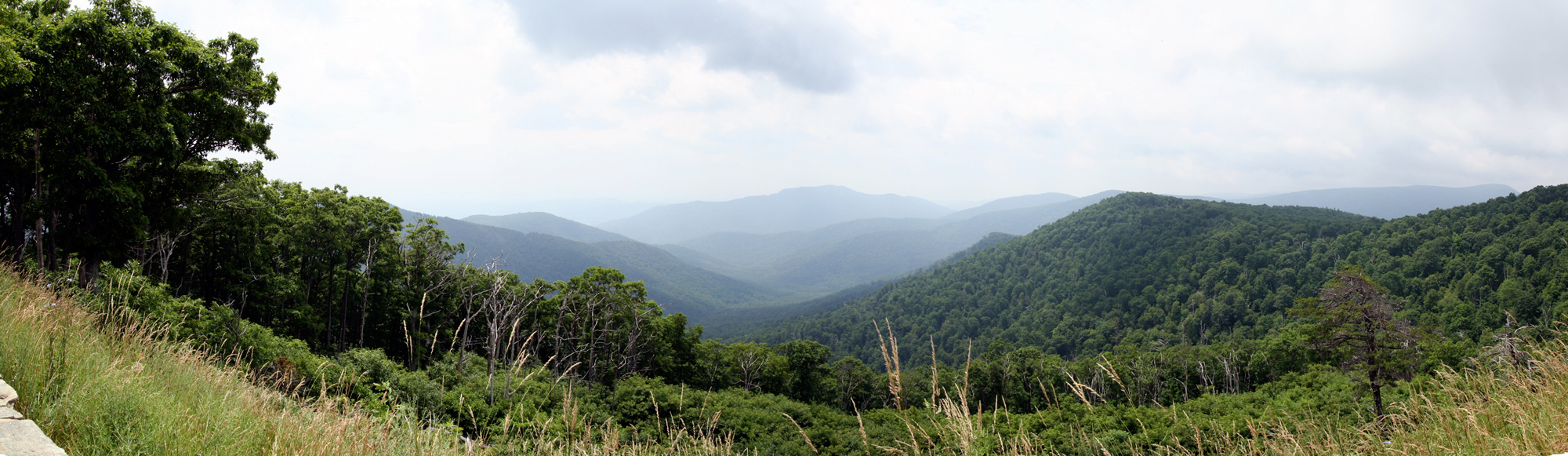
View from Pinnacles Overlook on Skyline Drive

The modern parkway, fruit of the automobile age, appears to have its origins in the Westchester County Parkways, New York, built between 1913 and 1930. At first, Congress also applied the idea locally — in the District of Columbia — but later undertook projects more clearly national in scope. Congress authorized its first parkway project in 1913, the four-mile (6 km) Rock Creek and Potomac Parkway, to connect Potomac Park with Rock Creek Park and the National Zoological Park. In 1928, Congress authorized the Mount Vernon Memorial Highway to link the District of Columbia with Mount Vernon in commemoration of the bicentennial of Washington's birth. In 1930 this highway was renamed the George Washington Memorial Parkway, and enlarged in concept to extend from Mount Vernon all the way to Great Falls in Virginia, and from Fort Washington to Great Falls in Maryland (Alexandria and the District of Columbia excepted).

During World War II Congress extended the National Capital parkway network by authorizing the Suitland Parkway to provide an access road to Andrews Air Force Base, and the Baltimore-Washington Parkway, whose initial unit provided access to Fort George G. Meade.

The Colonial Parkway in Virginia was the first authorized by Congress beyond the District of Columbia vicinity. It provided a landscaped 23-mile (37 km) roadway link between Jamestown Island, Colonial Williamsburg, and Yorktown Battlefield as part of Colonial National Monument, authorized in 1930.

A new era for National Parkways began with authorization of the Blue Ridge and Natchez Trace Parkways during the 1930s. These were not fairly short county or metropolitan parkways serving a variety of local and national traffic but protected recreational roadways traversing hundreds of miles of scenic and historic rural landscape. These different National Parkways started out as public works projects during the New Deal and were transformed into units of the National Park System.

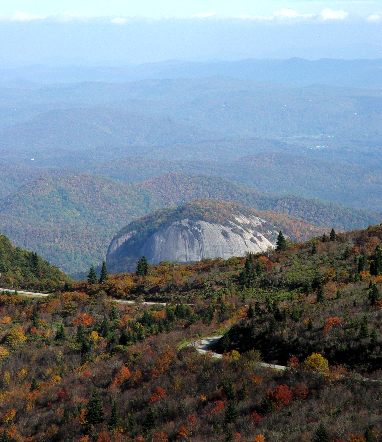
Blue Ridge Parkway across from Looking Glass Rock

The Skyline Drive in Shenandoah National Park served as a prototype for the Blue Ridge Parkway. President Herbert Hoover conceived the idea of the Skyline Drive during vacations at his Rapidan Camp. It was planned in 1931 and begun as a relief project in 1932.

Following President Roosevelt's election Congress quickly enacted the National Industrial Recovery Act of 1933 to stimulate the economy. Among other provisions it authorized the Public Works Administrator, Secretary of the Interior Harold L. Ickes, to prepare a comprehensive program of public works. Senator Harry F. Byrd of Virginia, aided by others, seized the opportunity to propose the construction of a scenic roadway linking Shenandoah and Great Smoky Mountains National Park as a public works project.

The Blue Ridge Parkway is considered by many to be a Service triumph in parkway design, providing the motorist with a serene environment conducive to leisurely travel and enjoyment while affording him many insights into the beauty, history, and culture of the Southern Highlands. The 469-mile (755 km) parkway, sometimes called a grand balcony, alternates sweeping views of mountain and valley with intimate glimpses of the fauna and flora of the Blue Ridge and close-up views of typical mountain structures, like Mabry's Mill, built of logs by pioneers and still operating.

The Natchez Trace Parkway is the second major National Parkway, a projected 450-mile (720 km) roadway through a protected zone of forest, meadow, and field which generally follows the route of the historic Natchez Trace from Nashville, Tennessee, to Natchez, Mississippi. The Old Natchez Trace was once an Indian path, then a wilderness road, and finally from 1800 to 1830 a highway binding the old Southwest to the Union. The parkway was completed in 2003 with the final link south of Nashville, Tennessee. The parkway links historic and natural features including Mount Locust, the earliest inn on the Trace, Emerald Mound, one of the largest Indian ceremonial structures in the United States, Chickasaw Village and Bynum Mounds in Mississippi, and Colbert's Ferry and Metal Ford in Tennessee.

=== Recreational demonstration areas ===
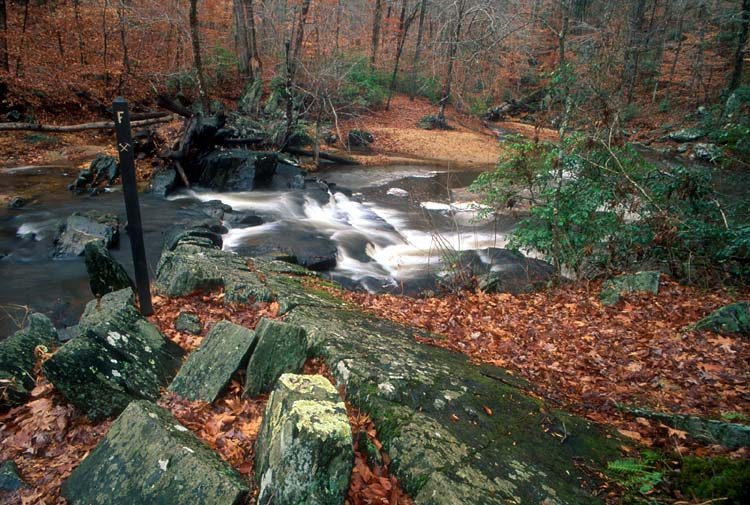
One of many small cascades on the North Valley Trail in Prince William Forest Park

Like the Blue Ridge Parkway, two other Recreation Areas in today's National Park System trace their origin back to the National Industrial Recovery Act of 1933 — Catoctin Mountain Park, Maryland, and Prince William Forest Park, Virginia.

Among many other features, the National Industrial Recovery Act authorized federal purchases of land considered submarginal for farming but valuable for recreation purposes. By 1936, 46 projects containing 397,000 acres (1,610 km^{2}) had been set up in 24 different states, mostly near metropolitan centers, to provide outdoor recreation for people from crowded cities. It was intended from the beginning that most of these projects would be turned over to states and cities for operation and in 1942 Congress provided the necessary authority. By 1946 most of the conveyances had been completed. The National Park Service retained Catoctin Mountain Park, site of Camp David, but 4,500 of its acres were transferred to Maryland. Prince William Forest Park (formerly Chopawamsic) was retained as a unit administrated by National Capital Parks.

Some recreational demonstration lands were also added to Acadia, Shenandoah, White Sands, and Hopewell Village. Now largely forgotten, recreational demonstration projects left several permanent marks on the National Park System and illustrated again the ability of the Service to help meet changing social and economic conditions in the nation.

=== Reservoir-related Recreation Areas ===
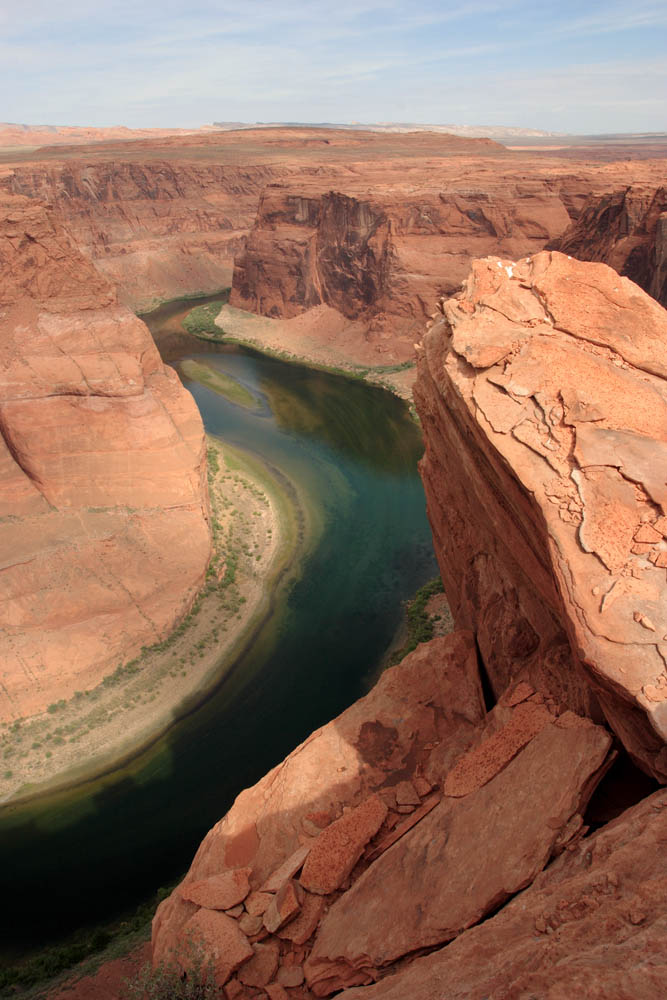
The Colorado river winds through Glen Canyon in northern Arizona.

Five National Recreation Areas were added to the System between 1933 and 1964. This new type of federal park area grew out of large scale reclamation projects like Hoover Dam and multi purpose river basin development programs like the Tennessee Valley Authority which began in the 1930s and spread to river valleys in all parts of the country after World War II.

Lake Mead was the first National Recreation Area. The Boulder Canyon Project Act, passed in 1928, authorized the Bureau of Reclamation to construct Hoover Dam on the Colorado River. Work began in 1931 and the dam, highest in the Western Hemisphere, was completed in 1935. The next year, under provisions of an agreement with the Bureau of Reclamation, the National Park Service assumed responsibility for all recreational activities at Lake Mead.

Coulee Dam National Recreation Area (now called Lake Roosevelt National Recreation Area) was established in 1946, under an agreement with the Bureau of Reclamation patterned after Lake Mead. Construction of Grand Coulee Dam began in 1933 and the dam went into operation in 1941. It impounds a huge body of water named Franklin D. Roosevelt Lake, 151 miles (243 km) long with 660 miles (1,060 km) of shoreline.

Although Millerton Lake, California, Lake Texoma, Oklahoma-Texas, and the north unit of Flaming Gorge, Utah-Wyoming were administered by the Service for a time, the first was subsequently turned over to the State of California, the second to the Army Corps of Engineers, and the last to the Forest Service.

Three more National Recreation Areas established during the 1950s are still in the National Park System today. Shadow Mountain, adjoining the west entrance to Rocky Mountain National Park, embraces the recreational features of Lake Granby and Shadow Mountain Lake, two units of the Colorado-Big Thompson Project. Glen Canyon was established in 1958 to provide for recreational activities on Lake Powell formed behind Glen Canyon Dam on the Colorado River, one of the highest dams in the world. The Whiskeytown-Shasta-Trinity National Recreation Area, California, was established by Act of Congress in 1962. The National Park Service, however, administers the recreational facilities only at Whiskeytown Reservoir, while the Forest Service takes care of similar, more extensive facilities at Shasta and Trinity.

By 1964, application of the National Recreation Area concept to major impoundments behind Federal dams, whether constructed by the Bureau of Reclamation or the Corps of Engineers, appeared to be well accepted by Congress. Eight more reservations of this type were authorized as additions to the National Park System between 1964 and 1972.

=== National Seashores ===
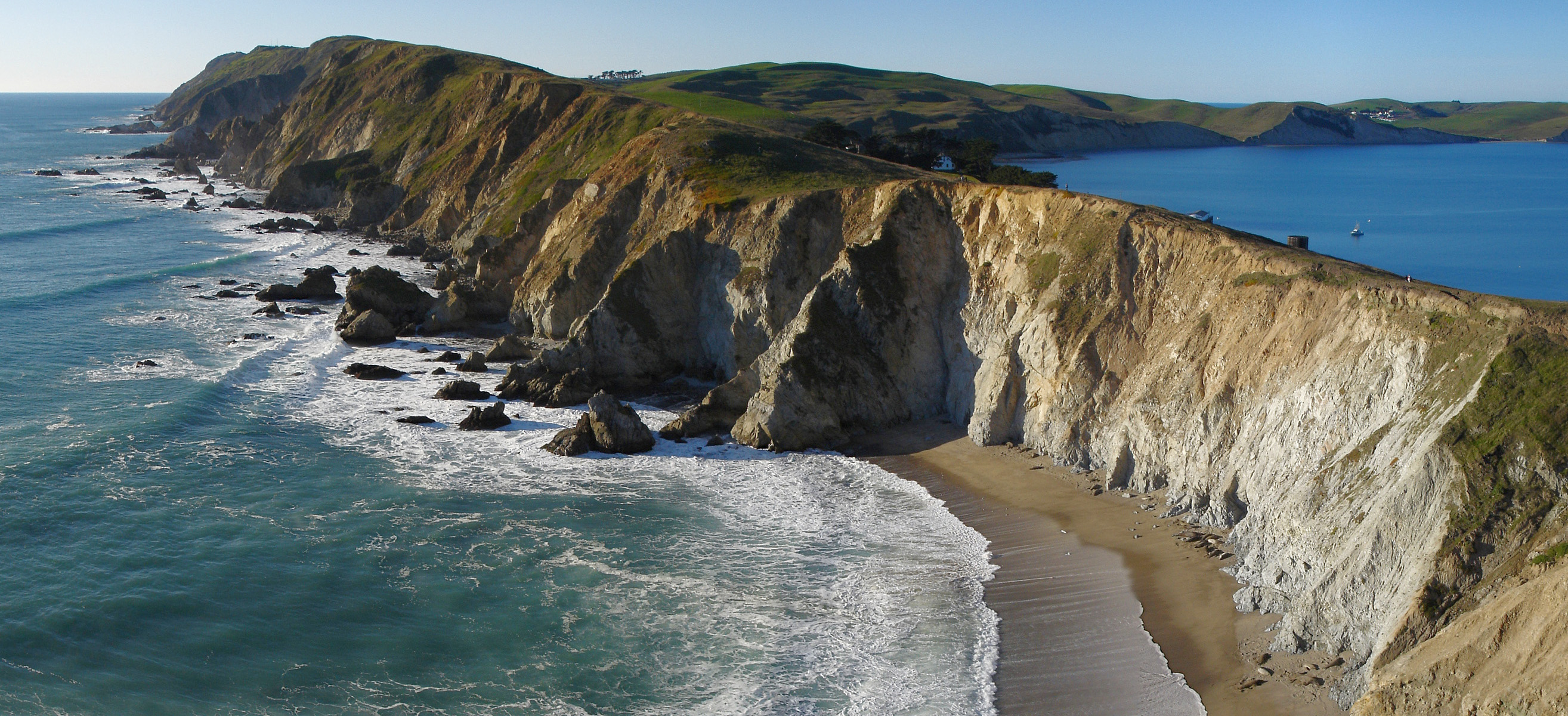
Looking back at the Point Reyes headlands from the Chimney Rock trail in winter. Elephant seals lie in the sand at the bottom of the cliffs. Point Reyes National Seashore

The first seashore recreation survey in the mid-1930s resulted in a recommendation that 12 major stretches of unspoiled Atlantic and Gulf Coast shoreline, with 437 miles (703 km) of beach, be preserved. World War II intervened and no action occurred before 1954. Then only one of the proposed areas was created: Cape Hatteras National Seashore, North Carolina. All but one — Cape Cod — had become commercial developments. A new shoreline surveys resulted in several major reports including Our Vanishing Shoreline (1955); A Report on the Seashore Recreation Survey of the Atlantic and Gulf Coasts (1955); Our Fourth Shore, Great Lakes Shoreline Recreation Area Survey (1959); and Pacific Coast Recreation Area Survey (1959). By 1972 fruits of this program included eight National Seashores and four National Lakeshores of which the first four were authorized before 1964.

The National Seashore concept reached the Pacific Coast in 1962 with authorization of Point Reyes, California, embracing more than forty miles of shoreline including historic Drakes Bay, Tomales Point, and Point Reyes itself. The National Seashore concept reached the Gulf Coast in 1962 also with authorization of Padre Island, Texas. This great shore island stretches for 113 miles (182 km) along the Texas coast from Corpus Christi on the north almost to Mexico on the south, and varies in width from a few hundred yards to about three miles (4.8 km). There is some private development at each end of the island.

== Continued expansion, 1966–present ==
The 1960s brought about public awareness of America's natural and historical wealth. The Johnson Administration became the start of a 'park's for people' mindset. Director Hartzog was the superintendent of the Gateway Arch National Park, then known as the Jefferson National Expansion Memorial, in St. Louis and was a supporter of public involvement and publicly accessible parks. It was the second 50 years that saw a significant increase in parks accessible to the general populations.

=== Redwood amendment ===
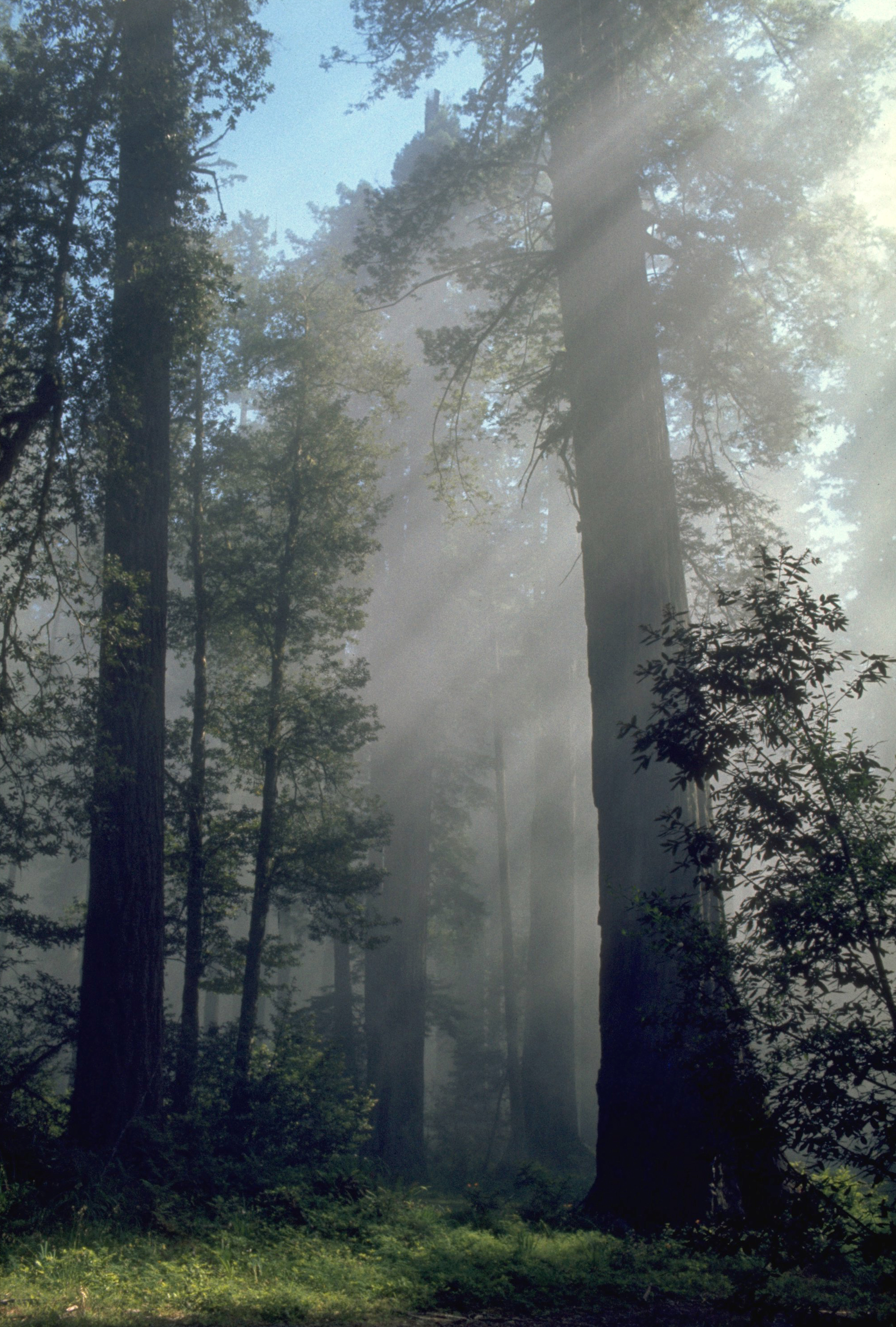
Sequoia sempervirens in Redwood National Park

During the 1960s numerous legal challenges arose over the mission of the National Park Service. Using the court decisions, Congress supplemented and clarified the Organic Act of 1916 through the National Park Service General Authorities Act of 1970. Additional challenges during the 1970s required that Congress again clarify the mission of the National Park Service. The 1979 amendment to the General Authorities Act of 1970 has been come known as the "Redwood amendment", as it also contained language expanding Redwood National Park. The key part of that act, as amended, is:

Congress declares that the national park system, which began with establishment of Yellowstone National Park in 1872, has since grown to include superlative natural, historic, and recreation areas in every major region of the United States, its territories and island possessions; that these areas, though distinct in character, are united through their inter-related purposes and resources into one national park system as cumulative expressions of a single national heritage; that, individually and collectively, these areas derive increased national dignity and recognition of their superlative environmental quality through their inclusion jointly with each other in one national park system preserved and managed for the benefit and inspiration of all the people of the United States; and that it is the purpose of this Act to include all such areas in the System and to clarify the authorities applicable to the system. Congress further reaffirms, declares and directs that the promotion and regulation of the various areas of the National Park system, as defined in section Ic of this title, shall be consistent with and founded in the purpose established by section I of this title (the Organic Act provisions), to the common benefit of all the people of the United States. The authorization of activities shall be construed and the protection, management, and administration of these areas shall be conducted in light of the high public value and integrity of the National Park System and shall not be exercised in derogation of the values and purposes for which these various areas have been established, except as may have been or shall be directly and specifically provided by Congress.

— 16 USC Ia-I

=== National Lakeshores ===
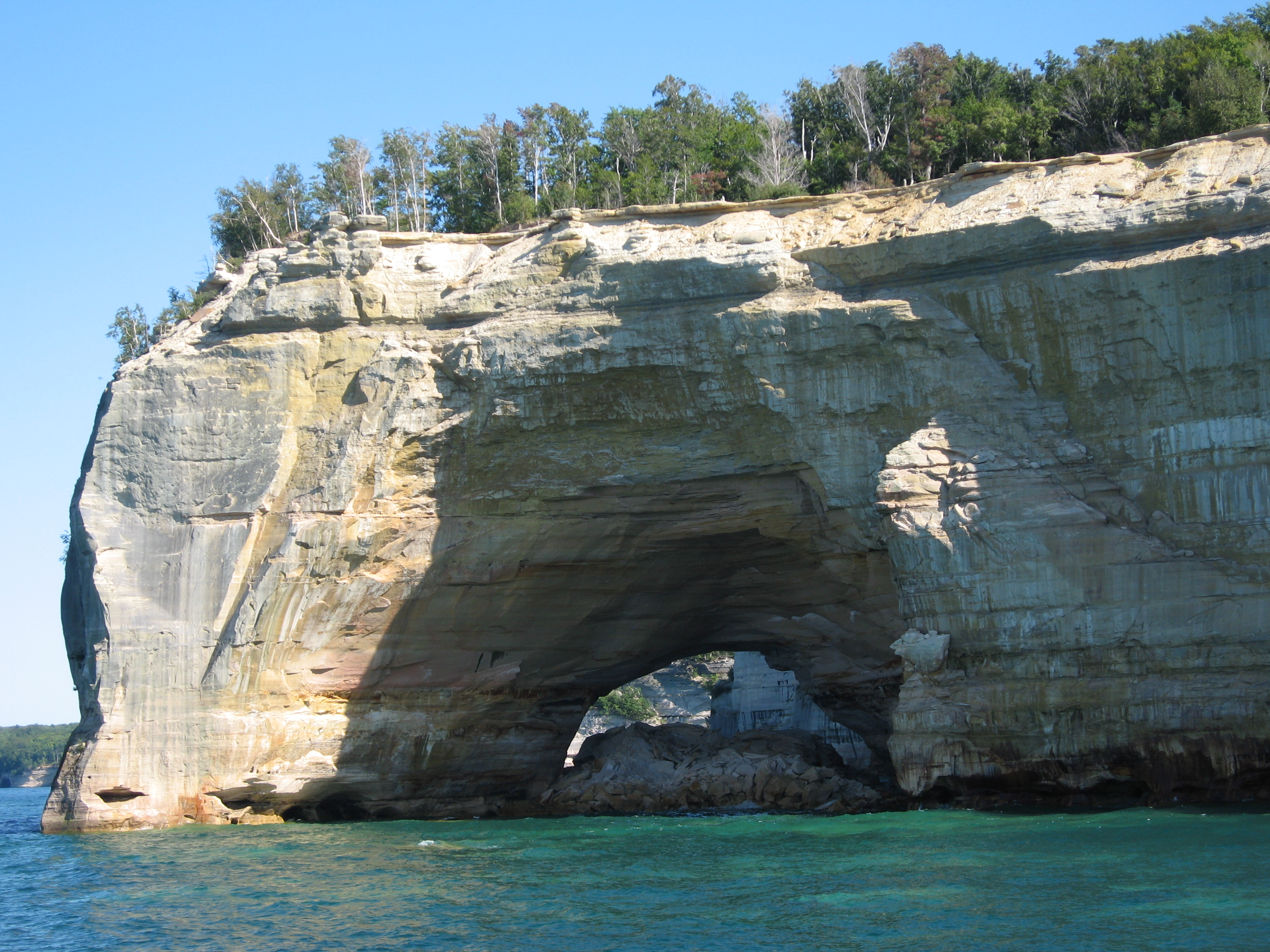
Grand portal at Pictured Rocks National Lakeshore

The first national lakeshores were created in 1966 from some of the remaining unspoiled or unique coastlines of the Great Lakes. The first lakeshores were Pictured Rocks National Lakeshore in the Upper Peninsula of Michigan and the Indiana Dunes National Lakeshore in Northwest Indiana. In 1970, two additional lakeshores were added: Sleeping Bear Dunes National Lakeshore on Michigan's western shore on Lake Michigan, and Apostle Islands National Lakeshore on Wisconsin's Lake Superior shore.

=== National Heritage Area ===
Heritage areas were first established to identify regions having a common cultural impact on the development of the United States. The Potomac Heritage National Scenic Trail in the Virginia, Maryland and District of Columbia was established on March 28, 1983. Fourteen areas existed by November 12, 1996. Initially, all the heritage areas were in the east and northeast. Today, they exist from coast to coast. The entire State of Tennessee has been designated as the Tennessee Civil War Heritage Area

=== Urban recreation areas ===
During the Richard Nixon presidency, public parks expanded with the creation of the two gateway parks. Golden Gate National Recreation Area in San Francisco became the western book end to Gateway National Recreation Area in New York City. Both were specifically created to serve these two major urban areas and create open space, rather than to preserve a specific scenic or cultural value.

On August 15, 1978, President Jimmy Carter signed into law the creation of the Chattahoochee River National Recreation Area, comprising 15 park units, ranging over 5,000 acres, and included 48 miles of the Chattahoochee River, in the Atlanta metropolitan area.

=== Alaska expansion ===
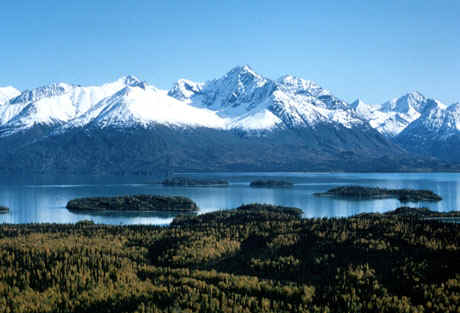
Lake Clark

In 1977, President Jimmy Carter created a dozen national monuments, in Alaska. The controversy that ensued led to the passage of the Alaska National Interest Lands Conservation Act (ANILCA). Through this act, Congress affirmed the Executive Order, adding to it. The act set aside 47 million acres (190,000 km^{2}) to the National Park System and 54 acres (220,000 m^{2}) to the National Wildlife Refuge System. The act provided for the creation or expansion of Denali National Park, Wrangell–St. Elias National Park and Preserve, Gates Of The Arctic National Park and Preserve, Lake Clark National Park and Preserve, Kobuk Valley National Park, Katmai National Park and Preserve, Glacier Bay National Park and Preserve, Kenai Fjords National Park, Kenai National Wildlife Refuge, Cape Krusenstern National Monument, Admiralty Island National Monument, Misty Fjords National Monument, Aniakchak National Monument and Preserve, Bering Land Bridge National Preserve, Noatak National Preserve, Yukon-Charley Rivers National Preserve, Yukon Delta National Wildlife Refuge, Yukon Flats National Wildlife Refuge, and made significant changes to the notable Arctic National Wildlife Refuge.

=== Reagan years (1981–1989) ===
President Ronald Reagan added eighteen new units to the National Park System during his eight years in the White House.

Date	Authority	Park Unit	Action
12/26/1988	P.L 100-534	Gauley River National Recreation Area, WV	new unit
10/26/1988	P.L 100-534	Bluestone National Scenic River, WV	new unit
11/18/1988	P.L. 100-696	Hagerman Fossil Beds National Monument, ID	new unit
11/18/1988	P.L. 100-696	City of Rocks National Reserve, ID	new unit
11/18/1988	P.L. 100-696	Mississippi National River and Recreation Area, MN	new unit
10/31/1988	P.L. 100-560	Poverty Point National Monument, LA	new unit
10/31/1988	P.L. 100-571	National Park of American Samoa, AS	new unit
10/07/1988	P.L. 100-479	Natchez National Historical Park, MS	new unit
09/08/1988	P.L. 100-421	Charles Pinckney National Historic Site, SC	new unit
06/27/1988	P.L. 100-348	San Francisco Maritime National Historical Park, CA	new unit
02/16/1988	P.L. 100-249	Timucuan Ecological and Historic Preserve, FL	new unit
12/31/1987	P.L. 100-225	El Malpais National Monument, NM	new unit
12/23/1987	P.L. 100-206	Jimmy Carter National Historic Site, GA	new unit
9/30/1987		Pennsylvania Avenue National Historic Site, DC	new unit
10/30/1986	P.L. 99-591	Steamtown National Historic Site, PA	new unit
05/23/1983	P.L. 98-32	Harry S Truman National Historic Site, MO	new unit
03/28/1983	P.L. 98-11	Natchez Trace National Scenic Trail, MS	new unit
03/28/1983	P.L. 98-11	Potomac Heritage National Scenic Trail, MD, DC, VA, & PA	new unit

=== Bush years (1989–1993) ===
President George H. W. Bush added fourteen new units to the National Park System during his four years in the White House.

Date	Authority	Park Unit	Action
10/27/1992	P.L. 102-543	Keweenaw National Historical Park, MI	new unit
10/27/1992	P.L. 102-536	Great Egg Harbor Scenic and Recreational River, NJ	new unit
10/26/1992	P.L. 102-525	Dry Tortugas National Park, FL	incorporated Fort Jefferson National Monument
10/26/1992	P.L. 102-525	Brown v. Board of Education National Historic Site, KS	new unit
10/21/1992	P.L. 102-427	Little River Canyon National Preserve, AL	new unit
10/16/1992	P.L. 102-419	Dayton Aviation Heritage National Historical Park, OH	new unit
08/26/1992	P.L. 102-350	Marsh-Billings National Historical Park, VT	new unit
03/03/1992	P.L. 102-248	Manzanar National Historic Site, CA	new unit
02/24/1992	P.L. 102-247	Salt River Bay National Historical Park and Ecological Preserve, VI	new unit
12/11/1991	P.L. 102-211	Mary McLeod Bethune Council House National Historic Site, DC	new unit
05/24/1991	P.L. 102-50	Niobrara National Scenic River, NE	new unit
10/31/1990	P.L. 101-485	Weir Farm National Historic Site, CT	new unit
06/27/1990	P.L. 101-313	Petroglyph National Monument, NM	new unit
06/27/1990	P.L. 101-313	Pecos National Historical Park, NM	incorporated Pecos National Monument
10/02/1989	P.L 101-106	Ulysses S. Grant National Historic Site, MO	new unit

=== Clinton years (1993–2001) ===
President Bill Clinton added nineteen new units to the National Park System, and de-authorized one during his eight years in the White House.

Date	Authority	Park Unit	Action
01/20/2001	Proclamation 7402	Governors Island National Monument, NY	new unit
01/17/2001	Proclamation 7399	Virgin Islands Coral Reef National Monument, VI	new unit
01/17/2001	Proclamation 7395	Minidoka Internment National Monument, ID	new unit
11/22/2000	P.L. 106-530	Great Sand Dunes National Preserve, CO	new unit
10/24/2000	P.L. 106-352	Rosie the Riveter / World War II Home Front National Historical Park, CA	new unit
10/11/2000	P.L. 106-291	Cuyahoga Valley National Park, OH	redesignated from a National Recreation Area
10/11/2000	P.L. 106-291	First Ladies National Historic Site, OH	new unit
11/29/1999	P.L. 106-115	Minuteman Missile National Historic Site, SD	new unit
10/21/1999	P.L. 106-076	Black Canyon of the Gunnison National Park, CO	redesignated from a National Monument
11/06/1998	P.L. 105-355	Tuskegee Airmen National Historic Site, AL	new unit
11/06/1998	P.L. 105-356	Little Rock Central High School National Historic Site, AR	new unit
11/02/1998	P.L. 105-342	Adams National Historic Park, MA	redesignated from Adams National Historical Site
10/21/1998	P.L. 105-277	Marsh-Billings-Rockefeller National Historical Park, VT	redesignated from Marsh-Billings National Historical Park
10/09/1997	P.L. 105-058	Oklahoma City National Memorial, OK	new unit
05/02/1997	P.L. 84-372	Franklin Delano Roosevelt Memorial, DC	new unit
01/01/1997		Lake Roosevelt National Recreation Area, WA	renamed from Coulee Dam National Recreation Area
11/12/1996	P.L. 104-333	Washita Battlefield National Historic Site, OK	new unit
11/12/1996	P.L. 104-333	Tallgrass Prairie National Preserve, KS	new unit
11/12/1996	P.L. 104-333	Nicodemus National Historic Site, KS	new unit
11/12/1996	P.L. 104-333	New Bedford Whaling National Historical Park, MA	new unit
11/12/1996	P.L. 104-033	Boston Harbor Islands National Recreation Area, MA	new unit
10/01/1995	P.L. 103-279	John F. Kennedy Center for the Performing Arts, DC	deauthorized as a park
07/27/1995	P.L. 99-572	Korean War Veterans Memorial, DC	new unit
11/02/1994	P.L. 103-449	Cane River Creole National Historical Park, LA	new unit
10/31/1994	P.L. 103-433	New Orleans Jazz National Historical Park, LA	new unit
10/31/1994	P.L. 103-433	Mojave National Preserve, CA	new unit
10/31/1994	P.L. 103-433	Joshua Tree National Park, CA	incorporated Joshua Tree National Monument
10/31/1994	P.L. 103-433	Death Valley National Park, CA	incorporated Death Valley National Monument
10/14/1994	P.L. 103-364	Saguaro National Park, AZ	incorporated Saguaro National Monument

=== Bush years (2001–2009) ===
President George W. Bush approved/created seven new units of the national park service during his eight years. In that period he also approved the deauthorization of the Oklahoma City National Memorial in Oklahoma City, Oklahoma.

Date	Authority	Park Unit	Action
12/05/2008	Proclamation 8327	World War II Valor in the Pacific National Monument	incorporated USS Arizona Memorial
05/08/2008	P.L. 110-229	Minidoka National Historic Site, ID	redesignated from Minidoka Internment National Monument
04/27/2007	P.L. 106-464	Sand Creek Massacre National Historic Site, CO	new unit
02/27/2006	Proclamation 7984	African Burial Ground National Monument, NY	new unit
02/27/2006	P.L. 108-192	Carter G. Woodson Home National Historic Site, DC	new unit
10/30/2004	P.L. 108-387	Lewis & Clark National Historical Park, OR	incorporates Fort Clatsop National Monument
09/24/2004	P.L. 106-530	Great Sand Dunes National Park, CO	redesignated from a National Monument
05/29/2004	P.L. 107- 011	National World War II Memorial, DC	new unit
01/23/2004	P.L. 108-199	Oklahoma City National Memorial, OK	deauthorized as a park
11/10/2003	P.L. 108-108	Congaree National Park, SC	incorporated Congaree Swamp National Monument
12/19/2002	P.L. 107-373	Cedar Creek and Belle Grove National Historical Park, VA	new unit
09/24/2002	P.L. 107-226	Flight 93 National Memorial, PA	new unit
08/21/2002	P.L. 107-219	Wolf Trap National Park for the Performing Arts, VA	name change
08/21/2002	P.L. 107-213	Craters of the Moon National Preserve, ID	new unit

=== Obama years (2009–2017) ===
President Barack Obama approved 26 new national park units during his eight years in office.

Date	Authority	Park Unit	Action
01/12/2017	Proclamation 9567	Reconstruction Era National Monument, SC	new unit
01/12/2017	Proclamation 9566	Freedom Riders National Monument, AL	new unit
01/12/2017	Proclamation 9565	Birmingham Civil Rights National Monument, AL	new unit
01/10/2017	P.L. 113-291	Harriet Tubman National Historical Park, NY	new unit
08/24/2016	Proclamation 9476	Kathadin Woods and Waters National Monument, ME	new unit
06/24/2016	Proclamation 9465	Stonewall National Monument, NY	new unit
04/12/2016	Proclamation 9423	Belmont-Paul Women's Equality National Monument, DC	new unit
02/12/2016	Proclamation 9394	Castle Mountains National Monument, CA	new unit
11/10/2015	P.L. 113-291	Manhattan Project National Historical Park, TN, NM, WA	new unit
07/10/2015	Proclamation 9299	Waco Mammoth National Monument, TX	new unit
02/24/2015	Proclamation 9234	Honouliuli National Monument, HI	new unit
02/19/2015	Proclamation 9233	Pullman National Monument, IL	new unit
12/19/2014	P.L. 113-291	Blackstone River Valley National Historical Park, MA, RI	new unit
12/19/2014	P.L 113-291	Valles Caldera National Preserve, NM	new unit
12/19/2014	P.L. 113-291	World War I Memorial, DC	new unit
12/19/2014	P.L. 113-291	Tule Springs Fossil Beds National Monument, NV	new unit
12/19/2014	P.L. 113-291	First State National Historical Park, DE	redesignated from First State National Monument
12/19/2014	P.L. 113-291	Harriet Tubman Underground Railroad National Historical Park, MD	redesignated from Harriet Tubman Underground Railroad National Monument
12/19/2014	P.L. 113-291	Oregon Caves National Monument and Preserve, OR	redesignated from Oregon Caves National Monument
03/25/2013	Proclamation 8945	Charles Young Buffalo Soldiers National Monument, OH	new unit
03/25/2013	Proclamation 8944	First State National Monument, DE	new unit
03/25/2013	Proclamation 8943	Harriet Tubman Underground Railroad National Monument, MD	new unit
01/10/2013	Proclamation 7266	Pinnacles National Park, CA	redesignated from National Monument
10/08/2012	Proclamation 8884	Cesar E. Chavez National Monument, CA	new unit
11/07/2011	P.L. 111- 11	Paterson Great Falls National Historical Park, NJ	new unit
11/01/2011	Proclamation 8750	Fort Monroe National Monument, VA	new unit
08/28/2011	P.L. 104-333	Martin Luther King Jr. Memorial, DC	new unit
12/22/2010	P.L 111-333	Longfellow House-Washington's Headquarters National Historic Site, MA	renamed from Longfellow National Historic Site
12/14/2010	P.L. 111-11	President William Jefferson Clinton Birthplace Home National Historic Site, AR	new unit
10/22/2010	P.L. 111-11	River Raisin National Battlefield Park, MI	new unit
10/28/2009	P.L. 111-84	Port Chicago Naval Magazine National Memorial, CA	new unit
03/30/2009	P.L. 111-11	Thomas Edison National Historical Park, NJ	redesignated from a national historic site with name change
03/30/2009	P.L. 111-11	Palo Alto Battlefield National Historical Park, TX	redesignated from a national historic site
03/30/2009	P.L. 111-11	Abraham Lincoln Birthplace National Historical Park, KY	redesignated from a national historic site

=== Trump years (2017–2021) ===
President Donald Trump approved 5 new national park units during his four years in office.

Date	Authority	Park Unit	Action
01/13/2021	P.L. 116-341	Jimmy Carter National Historical Park, GA	renamed from Jimmy Carter National Historic Site
01/13/2021	P.L. 116-328	Homestead National Historical Park, NE	renamed from Homestead National Monument of America
01/05/2021	P.L. 116-305	Weir Farm National Historical Park, CT	renamed from Weir Farm National Historical Site
12/27/2020	P.L. 116-260	New River Gorge National Park and Preserve, WV	renamed from New River Gorge National River
11/09/2020	P.L. 116-9	Medgar and Myrlie Evers Home National Monument, MS	new unit
10/30/2020	P.L. 115-141	Ste. Genevieve National Historical Park, MO	new unit
09/22/2020	P.L. 116-9	Mill Springs Battlefield National Monument, KY	new unit
09/18/2020	P.L. 109-220	Dwight D. Eisenhower Memorial, DC	new unit
12/20/2019	P.L. 116-92	White Sands National Park, NM	redesignated from White Sands National Monument
03/12/2019	P.L. 116-9	Honouliuli National Historic Site, HI	redesignated from Honouliuli National Monument
03/12/2019	P.L. 116-9	Tule Lake National Monument, CA	redesignated from World War II Valor in the Pacific National Monument
03/12/2019	P.L. 116-9	Pearl Harbor National Memorial, HI	redesignated from World War II Valor in the Pacific National Monument
03/12/2019	P.L. 116-9	Golden Spike National Historical Park, UT	redesignated from Golden Spike National Historical Site
03/12/2019	P.L. 116-9	Reconstruction Era National Historical Park, SC	redesignated from Reconstruction Era National Historical Site
03/12/2019	P.L. 116-9	Fort Sumter and Fort Moultrie National Historical Park, SC	redesignated from Fort Sumter National Monument
03/12/2019	P.L. 116-9	Saint-Gaudens National Historical Park, NH	redesignated from Saint-Gaudens National Historic Site
03/12/2019	P.L. 116-9	Ocmulgee Mounds National Historical Park, GA	redesignated from Ocmulgee National Monument
02/15/2019	P.L. 166-6	Indiana Dunes National Park, IN	redesignated from Indiana Dunes National Lakeshore
10/26/2018	Proclamation 9811	Camp Nelson National Monument, KY	new unit
02/22/2018	S. 1438	Gateway Arch National Park, MO	redesignated from Jefferson Expansion Memorial
01/08/2018	P.L. 115-108	Martin Luther King, Jr. National Historical Park, GA	redesignated from a national historic site

=== Biden years (2021–2025) ===
President Joe Biden approved 6 new national park units during his four years in office.

Date	Authorization	Parks	Action
December 9, 2024		Carlisle Federal Indian Boarding School National Monument, PA	new unit
August 16, 2024	Proclamation 10792	Springfield 1908 Race Riot National Monument, IL	new unit
July 17, 2024	P.L. 117-206	Blackwell School National Historic Site, TX	new unit
February 15, 2024	P.L. 117-106	Amache National Historic Site, CO	new unit
November 16, 2023	P.L. 96-370	Ice Age National Scenic Trail, WI	Administratively redesignated as an NPS unit
November 16, 2023	P.L. 111-11	New England National Scenic Trail, MA, CT	Administratively redesignated as an NPS unit
November 16, 2023	P.L. 96-199 and P.L. 116-9	North Country National Scenic Trail, VT to ND	Administratively redesignated as an NPS unit
July 25, 2023	Proclamation 10602	Emmett Till and Mamie Till-Mobley National Monument, IL, MS	new unit
December 29, 2022	P.L. 117-328	New Philadelphia National Historic Site, IL	new unit
December 29, 2022	P.L. 117-328	Pullman National Historical Park, IL	redesignated from Pullman National Monument
May 12, 2022	P.L. 117-123	Brown v. Board of Education National Historical Park, KS	redesignated from Brown v. Board of Education National Historic Site

== See also ==
- Forest Reserve Act of 1891

== External sources ==
- NPS official site
- Criteria for inclusion in the National Park System
- The Book of the National Parks by Robert Sterling Yard
- Designation of National Park System Units
- National Park System Timeline
- A National Monument, Memorial, Park... What's the Difference?
