= Aubrey L. Haines =

American park ranger and historian

- Born: Aubrey Leon Haines; August 30, 1914; Portland, Oregon, U.S.
- Died: September 10, 2000 (aged 86); Tucson, Arizona, U.S.
- Education: University of Washington, B.S. in Forestry (1938), University of Montana Missoula, M.S. in Forestry (1949)
- Occupations: Park ranger and historian
- Employer: National Park Service
- Known for: First Park Historian of Yellowstone National Park

Aubrey Leon Haines (1914 – 2000) was a Yellowstone National Park and Mount Rainier National Park ranger and the first Park Historian of Yellowstone National Park.

== Early life and education ==
Aubrey Leon Haines was born to Doris E. and Albert S. Haines on August 30, 1914, in Portland, Oregon. He graduated from high school in Seattle in 1933. In 1938, he earned a Bachelor of Science degree in forestry from the University of Washington. In June 1941, Haines was furloughed from Yellowstone National Park for military service, where he spent four years with the Army Corps of Engineers. Haines went on to earn a Master of Science in forestry from the University of Montana in 1949 and complete a year of doctoral degree work at the University of Washington.

== Career in Yellowstone National Park ==
In 1938, Haines began working as a Yellowstone National Park ranger. Following the conclusion of his military service in 1945, Haines returned to work as a ranger until his promotion to assistant park engineer in 1946. Haines spent two years as the assistant park engineer before departing to undertake degree work for his master's degree at the University of Montana. In 1950, Haines returned to the National Park Service as a supervisory park ranger at Mount Rainier National Park. In 1956, he was transferred back to Yellowstone National Park and his old job as assistant park engineer.

In 1960, Haines was appointed to the newly created position of park historian where he served until his retirement in 1969.

== Personal life ==
In 1946, Haines married C. Wilma Smith from White Bluff, Tennessee. Over the years, the couple had three children: Alan, Betsy, and Calvin.

== Later years ==
After his retirement, Haines served as a research consultant for the National Park Service. He studied "the national parks idea" for the Branch of History in Washington, D.C., from 1970 to 1972. Between 1972 and 1973, Haines completed research on historic sites along the Oregon Trail for the Bureau of Outdoor Recreation.

In this capacity, Haines assisted in establishing the Oregon National Historic Trail through researching and documenting the trail. He also completed an extensive study titled Historic Sites Along the Oregon Trail. Haines continued to serve as a consultant for other projects and write scholarly books and articles until his death on September 10, 2000. He donated his papers to Montana State University, which are now held by Special Collections and Archival Informatics at the Montana State University Library.

== Publications ==
- Haines, Aubrey L. Historic Sites along the Oregon Trail. Denver: Denver Service Center, National Park Service, 1973.
- Haines, Aubrey L. The Yellowstone Story: A History of Our First National Park. Rev. ed. Yellowstone National Park, Wyo. : Niwot, Colo.: Yellowstone Association for Natural Science, History & Education; University Press of Colorado, 1996.
- Haines, Aubrey L. Yellowstone Place Names: Mirrors of History. Niwot, Colo.: University Press of Colorado, 1996.
- Haines, Aubrey L. Three Biographical Sketches from the Mountain Men in the Fur Trade, Vol. 1. Glendale, Calif.: A. H. Clark, 1965.
- Haines, Aubrey L. Mountain Fever, Historic Conquests of Rainier. Portland: Oregon Historical Society, 1962.
- Haines, Aubrey L, Haines, Aubrey L., and United States. National Park Service. Issuing Body. Yellowstone National Park: Its Exploration and Establishment. Washington: U.S. National Park Service; [for Sale by the Supt. of Docs., U.S. Govt. Print. Off.], 1974.
- Haines, Aubrey L. A History of the Yellowstone National Park Chapel, 1913-1963. Rev.. ed. Yellowstone Park, Wyo.: Yellowstone National Park, 1998.
- Haines, Aubrey L., and Jack R. Williams. An Elusive Victory: The Battle of the Big Hole. West Glacier, Mont.: Glacier Natural History Association, 1991.
