= Heritage Conservation and Recreation Service =

The Heritage Conservation and Recreation Service (HCRS) was an agency within the United States Department of the Interior which subsumed its functions from the National Park Service and Bureau of Outdoor Recreation. It was created under the Carter administration by order of the Secretary of the Interior on January 25, 1978. HCRS, a non-land managing agency, was responsible for assuring the identification, protection, and beneficial use of important cultural, natural, and recreational American resources. HCRS offered grant assistance, technical information and guidance to those in the public and private sectors involved in conservation or recreation projects. Under the Reagan administration the HCRS was abolished by Secretarial Order 3060 on February 19, 1981, and absorbed into the National Park Service.

During its brief tenure, HCRS revolutionized the integration of natural resource based planning and cultural and historic preservation. HCRS was involved with a number of important achievements during its relatively short existence including:

1. Publication of the Third Outdoor Recreation Plan (P.L. 88–29) in 1978 and its 1979 Nationwide Recreation Action Program;
2. Support for the passage and implementation of the Urban Parks and Recreation Recovery Act (P.L. 95-625);
3. Creation of a one million acre Pinelands National Reserve in New Jersey;
4. Support for addition of twenty-one units to the National Park System;
5. Support for enlargement of the National Wilderness System;
6. Addition of eight units to the National Wild and Scenic Rivers System;
7. Tripling of mileage in the National Trails System (P.L. 95-625);
8. Acceleration of National Recreation trails designations;
9. Authorization of the use of abandoned highway lands for bikeway and recreation development through the 1978 Surface Transportation Assistance Act;
10. Launching the nationwide "rails to trails" program through authorization of an initial demonstration grant program to convert abandoned railroad rights-of-way to conservation and recreation purposes through the Railroad Revitalization and Regulatory Reform Act;
11. helping to justify Executive Action to set aside 120 million acres of outstanding natural, cultural and recreation resources in Alaska;
12. Preparation of the National Heritage Policy Act to establish a national heritage policy and provide a basis for a State-based partnership program to identify, select, and protect special natural areas and historic places;
13. Support for issuance of three Executive Orders which:
  - (a) protect Federal lands from degradation by off-road vehicles,
  - (b) ensure that Federal agencies protect natural, cultural, and recreation values of wetlands by minimizing their loss or degradation, &
  - (c) mandating access for the handicapped in all Federal or federally assisted programs and facilities through Federal agency guidelines issued by the Secretary of Health, Education and Welfare;
14. Completion of the 1978 the National Urban Recreation Study, the first comprehensive assessment of the Nation's urban recreation problems and options for local, State and Federal action; &
15. Reducing paperwork and shortening project approval time for the States through new consolidated grant applications for the Land and Water Conservation Fund (P.L. 95–42), increasing its funding to $900 million for FY1978, and increasing public participation in the Statewide Comprehensive Outdoor Recreation Plan process.

HCRS also played a major role in advocating for passage of legislation to protect the biodiversity and other natural resources found on Barrier Islands which passed the U.S. Congress in 1982 as the Coastal Barrier Resources Act (P.L. 97-348). These and other actions of HCRS were detailed in the Third Outdoor Recreation Plan transmitted to the Congress of the United States by President Jimmy Carter on December 11, 1979.

The Secretary of the Interior was Cecil D. Andrus and the Assistant Secretary for Fish and Wildlife and Parks Robert L. Herbst. The senior management of HCRS during the period of 1977-1980 consisted of: Chris Therral Delaporte, director; Meg Maguire, deputy director; and Paul C. Pritchard, deputy director.

During this agency's existence, a number of important publications and research on historic preservation issues were completed. Within the HCRS was a "Policy on Disposition of Human Remains" that was a standard for federal agencies within the Department of the Interior interested in studying bones and handling human remains.

The policy was an early attempt at relieving tensions between Native Americans and the U.S. government. The HCRS called for the reburial of all remains that were in deliberate burials whose direct relation to modern relatives could be proven. Before the reburial, however, the U.S. government was permitted to study and document the remains.
