= Bureau of Outdoor Recreation =

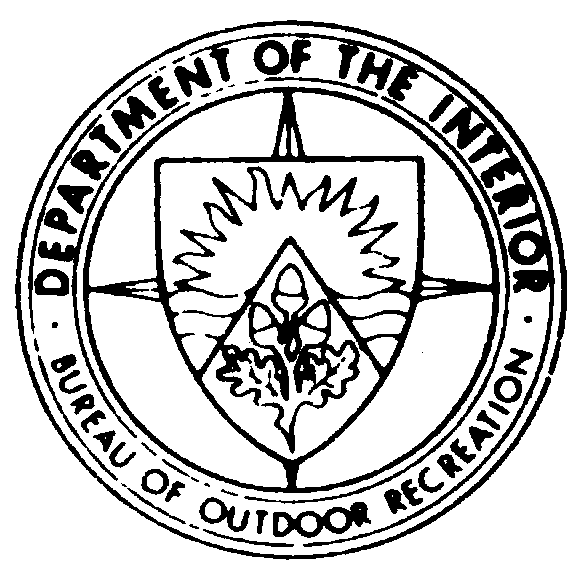

The Bureau of Outdoor Recreation (BOR) was an agency of the United States Department of the Interior with the mission of planning outdoor recreation opportunities for the Interior Department and assisting private, local, and state organizations with their recreation planning. BOR was founded by Secretarial Order in April 1962, and formally established with the passage of the National Outdoor Recreation Act (Public Law 88-29) in May 1963. The functions of Nationwide Planning and Cooperative Services were transferred from the National Park Service to BOR after its establishment. The Bureau was absorbed into a new agency, the Heritage Conservation and Recreation Service, in 1977.

== History ==
In 1956, Mission 66 was established to help accommodate users during a period of increasing usage of recreation sites. After the Great Depression, many parks became more accessible as bad roads were replaced by the US highway system, which in turn was more usable because of the increasing availability of automobiles. A series of tests performed for Mission 66 indicated several opportunities for preservation of parks, parkways, and seashores. In 1958, Congress created the Outdoor Recreation Resources Review Commission (ORRRC) to determine recreation needs, inventory recreation resources, and to recommend policies and programs to "...ensure that the needs of the present and future are adequately and efficiently met." ORRRC released its report in 1962, recommending the establishment of the BOR to help bring structure to outdoor recreation programs.

== Impacts ==
=== Land and Water Conservation Fund ===
The Land and Water Conservation Fund (LWCF) was created in 1965 by the Land and Water Conservation Fund Act (LWCFA).The ORRRC recommended this act to help the states in meeting the rising demand for outdoor recreation. This act allowed the fund that the LWCF earned to be distributed back into the recreation agencies to help the development of the program by the Bureau of Outdoor Recreation. This act provided a very broad authority from the U.S. Congress to charge entrance fees and use fees for recreation. Also this act required that states submit State Comprehensive Outdoor Recreation Plans (SCORPS) to the BOR before they could get LWCF grants.

=== The BOR's Involvement in Alaska ===
In the mid-1970s, the BOR was tasked with surveying various river systems in the state of Alaska, for potential nomination into the National Wild and Scenic Rivers program. The BOR provided oversight to teams that traveled to many river systems across the state, for the purpose of assessing the recreational value of these river systems. Each of these teams took detailed notes of their experiences on the river, noting wildlife observed, fishing opportunities, river mileage, gradient, terrain and vegetation, river hazards and other issues of interest to recreational boaters. In cases where multiple trips were taken to the same river, multiple sets of notes were taken. These notes were compiled into the Alaska River Logs, which are presently hosted on the Alaska Outdoors Supersite. The Alaska River Logs were subsequently compiled into a book, "The Alaska Paddling Guide", co-authored by Jack Mosby and David Dapkus, two BOR employees who were involved in the project. Eventually the following 25 rivers were selected for the National Wild and Scenic program:

- Alagnak River
- Alatna River
- Andreafsky River
- Aniakchak River
- Beaver Creek
- Birch Creek
- Charley River
- Chilikadrotna River
- Delta River
- Fortymile River
- Gulkana River
- Ivishak River
- John River
- Kobuk River
- Koyukuk River (North Fork)
- Mulchatna River
- Noatak River
- Nowitna River
- Salmon River
- Selawik River
- Sheenjek River
- Tinayguk River
- Tlikakila River
- Unalakleet River
- Wind River

=== State Comprehensive Outdoor Recreation Plans ===
State Comprehensive Outdoor Recreation Plans (SCORP) were studies that the states prepared and submitted to the Bureau of Outdoor Recreation before they could qualify for LWCF grants. SCORP has raised awareness of outdoor recreation across the nation by having hundreds of scientists, who would not have normally been working on outdoor recreation projects, involved in the studies. Once studies about outdoor recreation began a ripple affect happened. Scientists at colleges and universities began doing more research going past the requirements for SCORP which then stimulated more people to outdoor recreation.

=== Rails-to-Trails ===
The Bureau was one of the earliest federal agencies to become interested in the concept of converting abandoned railroad lines to trails for walking, bicycling, skiing and other recreational uses. In 1971 it published "Establishing Trails on Rights-of-Way," a booklet that gave the rationale and explained the process for acquiring and developing these facilities; it also provided the public with a lengthy and intriguing list of rail corridors in every state that had been abandoned between 1960 and 1970. In 1977, under the authority of the Railroad Revitalization and Regulatory Reform Act, Congress gave BOR additional resources to further stimulate the creation of trails—the Rails-to-Trails Demonstration Grant Program. That program ultimately helped establish nine of the earliest rail-trails, in California, Maryland, Missouri, New Jersey, New York, Ohio, Pennsylvania, Virginia and Washington.

=== Area Classification Plan ===
The Area Classification Plan used different types of lands to classify them as either

- Class I: High-Density Recreation Areas
- Class II: General Outdoor Recreation Areas
- Class III: Natural Environment Areas
- Class IV: Unique Natural Areas
- Class V: Primitive Areas
- Class VI: Historic and Cultural Sites

This system was in place until the early 1980s, when the recreation opportunity spectrum system replaced it.

== Absorption ==
In 1977 the Heritage Conservation and Recreation Service (HCRS) was created to enforce the New Heritage Program, and the service absorbed the responsibilities of the BOR. HCRS resulted from the consolidation of over 30 different laws and focused on the identification and protection of the nation's significant natural, cultural, and recreational resources. In 1981 HCRS was abolished as an agency; its responsibilities were transferred to the National Park Service.
