= Turtle Mound =

Archaeological site in Florida, US

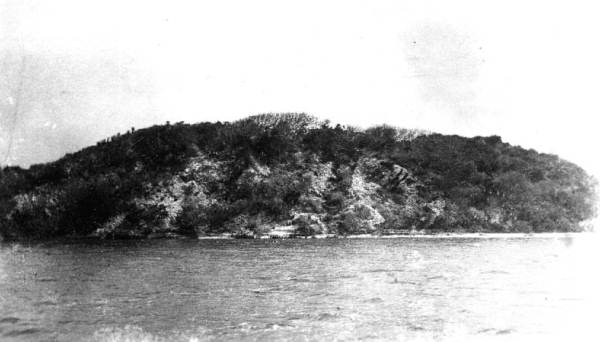
- Image of Turtle Mound in 1915

- Location within Florida today
- 28°55′51″N 80°49′37″W
- Cultures: St. Johns culture
- Location: New Smyrna Beach, Volusia County, Florida, United States
- Region: Halifax area

History
- Built: 1000 BCE
- Abandoned: 1400 CE

Site notes
- Architectural style: shell mound
- Responsible body: State of Florida

Turtle Mound is a prehistoric archaeological site located 9 miles (14 km) south of New Smyrna Beach, Florida, United States, on State Road A1A, between the Mosquito Lagoon (Note: South of the Halifax River) and the Atlantic Ocean. On September 29, 1970, it was added to the National Register of Historic Places. Today the site is owned and managed by the National Park Service as part of Canaveral National Seashore.

== Characteristics ==
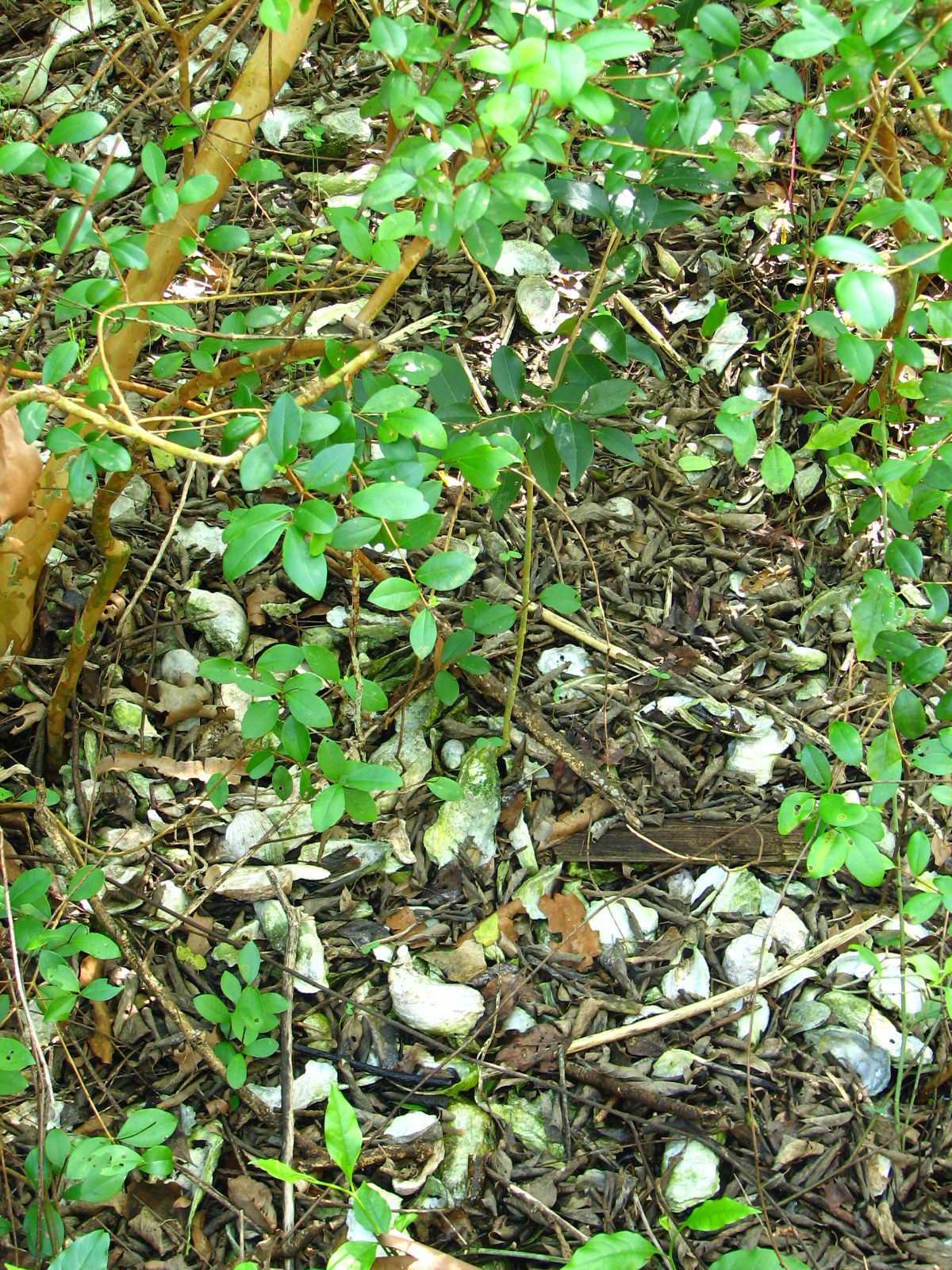
Oyster shells visible beneath the overgrowth

A refuse deposit composed mostly of oyster shells, the 2-acre (0.81 ha) mound ranges for over 600 feet (180 m) along the lagoon shoreline and holds over 35,000 cubic yards (27,000 m^{3}) of shells. It is the largest shell midden on the mainland United States, with an approximate height of 35–50 feet (11–15 m), but no extensive excavations have been made. (Note: An account published in 1859 mentioned ashes, charcoal, and fishbones, along with "numberless pieces of Indian pottery", but no human remains.) Sparsely vegetated in the early 19th century, (Note: Reports from 1817 and earlier only referred to grass clumps.) it has since been covered by a dense maritime hammock, its primary cover being woody.

Along with similar mounds regionally, it is the northernmost outpost of several tropical plant taxa, possibly due to its secluded, elevated, seaside location and to heat retention by shells; a study in 1923 found its flora to be "largely of a tropical character", as did repeated surveys that also spotted rare species. (Note: Freezes in the 1980s eliminated some species from the site.) Migratory seabirds, raptors, and other avians frequent the site, likely fostering seed dispersal there.

Its peak affords the site a panorama for miles, leading a visitor in 1926 to remark that "one has the sensation of standing on top of a mountain". The statehouse in Eldora and nearby Bethune Beach are observable from its top, along with many other features that set the site apart from other such points in Florida: over 20 mi (32 km) of wild coastline to its south, the lagoon to its west, and the ocean to its east.

== History ==
The mound, dating to between 800 and 1400, (Note: Recent radio-carbon dating has dated it to around 1000 BCE.) contains waste from the Timucua, who caught many reptiles and small mammals here. The Timucua may have used the site as an observatory, for ceremonies, or as a refuge during hurricanes. The Timucua experienced greater competitive forces for finite resources such as arable land resulting in increased open conflict. This is apparent in some of the material found in the Turtle Mound location where it occupied an important location along the coast. Archaeologists have recently found 1,200-year-old pottery on the site.

Before the late 19th century, Turtle Mound was estimated to be 75 feet (23 m) high. Visible 7 mi (11 km) seaward, the mound was used as a landmark by mariners, including Spanish explorers and later navigators. Along with the 12-metre-high (39 ft) Green Mound, Turtle Mound was one of the most visible markers on the Florida east coast before lighthouses were built.

In 1605 Álvaro Mexía dubbed the site Baradero de Surruque, (Note: Surruque, a nearby town, was named after the cacique (chief) and Indian tribe that lived in the area.) and observed natives floating their dugout canoes at its foot. In the late 18th century, the site was named Mount Belvedere (1769), The Rock (1769), and Mount Tucker (1796). Over time the mound began to take the form of a turtle, giving the feature a name first used on a map published in William Bartram's Travels (1791). (Note: Bartram himself may have visited the mound in 1766 and described it as "an entire heap of sea shells".)

Like other mounds, it was slated for use as fill material, but efforts by John B. Stetson Jr. and others led to its acquisition by the state of Florida in 1951. A 6-foot (1.8 m) wall to halt erosion was erected in 1964 on its northwest, and a pair of lookouts were added in 1972.

=== Tropical plant taxa ===
Tropical plant taxa at or near Turtle Mound
Scientific name	Common name	Abundance	Habitat	Year first noted
Agave vivipara	agave	dominant	beach	c.1766
Amyris elemifera	torchwood	dominant	exposed slopes	1921
Ardisia escallonioides	marlberry	dominant		1921
Avicennia germinans	black mangrove	occasional	riverside	1921
Carica papaya	papaya	rare		1921
Chiococca alba	snowberry	abundant		1921
Cissus trifoliata	marine vine, sorrel vine	abundant	west side	1971–3
Citrus × aurantium	wild orange	occasional		c.1766
Eugenia axillaris	white stopper	dominant		1921
Exothea paniculata	inkwood, butterbough	frequent		1921
Harrisia fragrans	night-blooming cereus	rare		1971–3
Heliotropium angiospermum	scorpion-tail	occasional	riverside	1971–3
Laguncularia racemosa	white mangrove	rare	riverside	1921
Mentzelia floridana	poor man's patches	occasional	open spots	1921
Myrcianthes fragrans	nakedwood	dominant		1921
Myrsine floridana	Unknown	frequent		1971–3
Ocotea coriacea	lancewood	rare		1971–3
Plumbago scandens	leadwort	frequent		1921
Psychotria nervosa	wild coffee	frequent		1921
Rhizophora mangle	red mangrove	occasional	riverside	1921
Schoepfia chrysophylloides	whitewood	rare		1971–3
Sideroxylon foetidissimum	mastic	rare		1971–3
Zanthoxylum fagara	wild lime	dominant	exposed spots near summit	1971–3

== Gallery ==
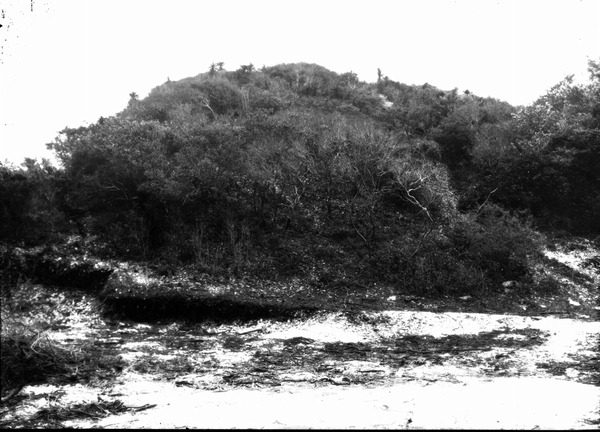
Turtle Mound in 1924

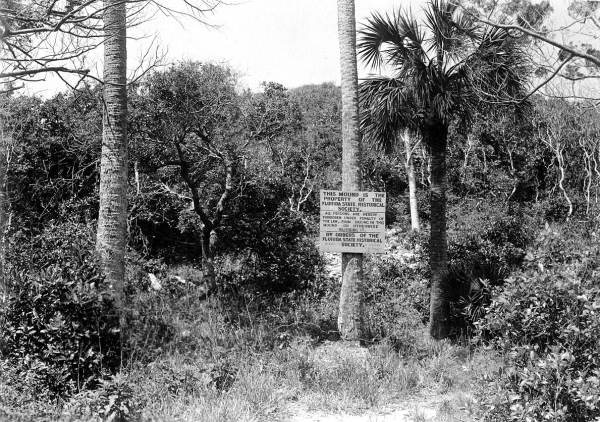
Turtle Mound in 1929

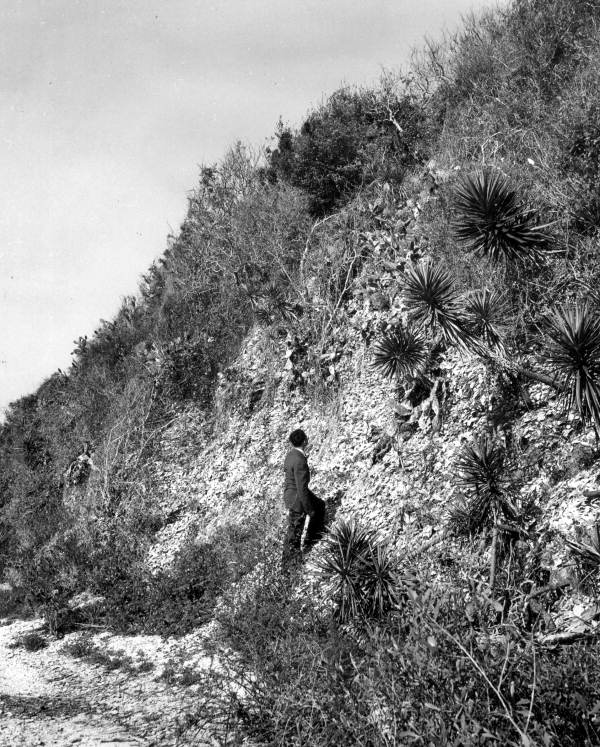
Mound slope in 1950

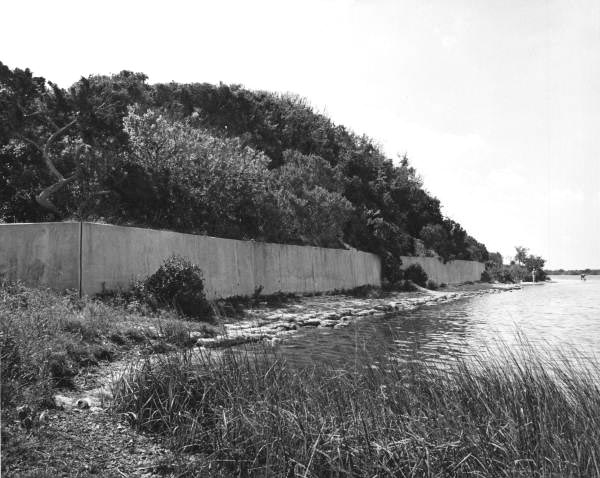
Mound wall in 1970

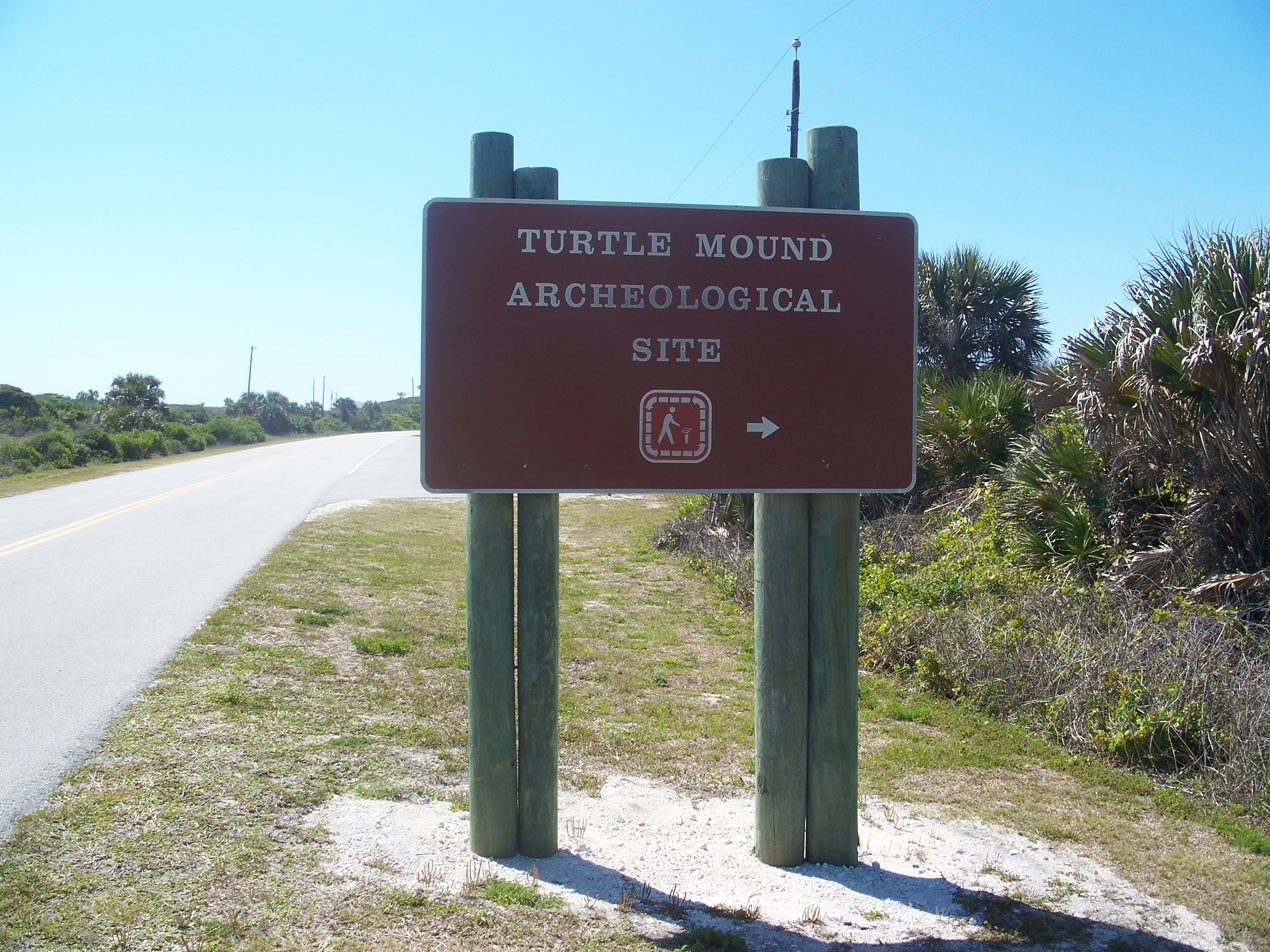
Sign pointing the way to mound

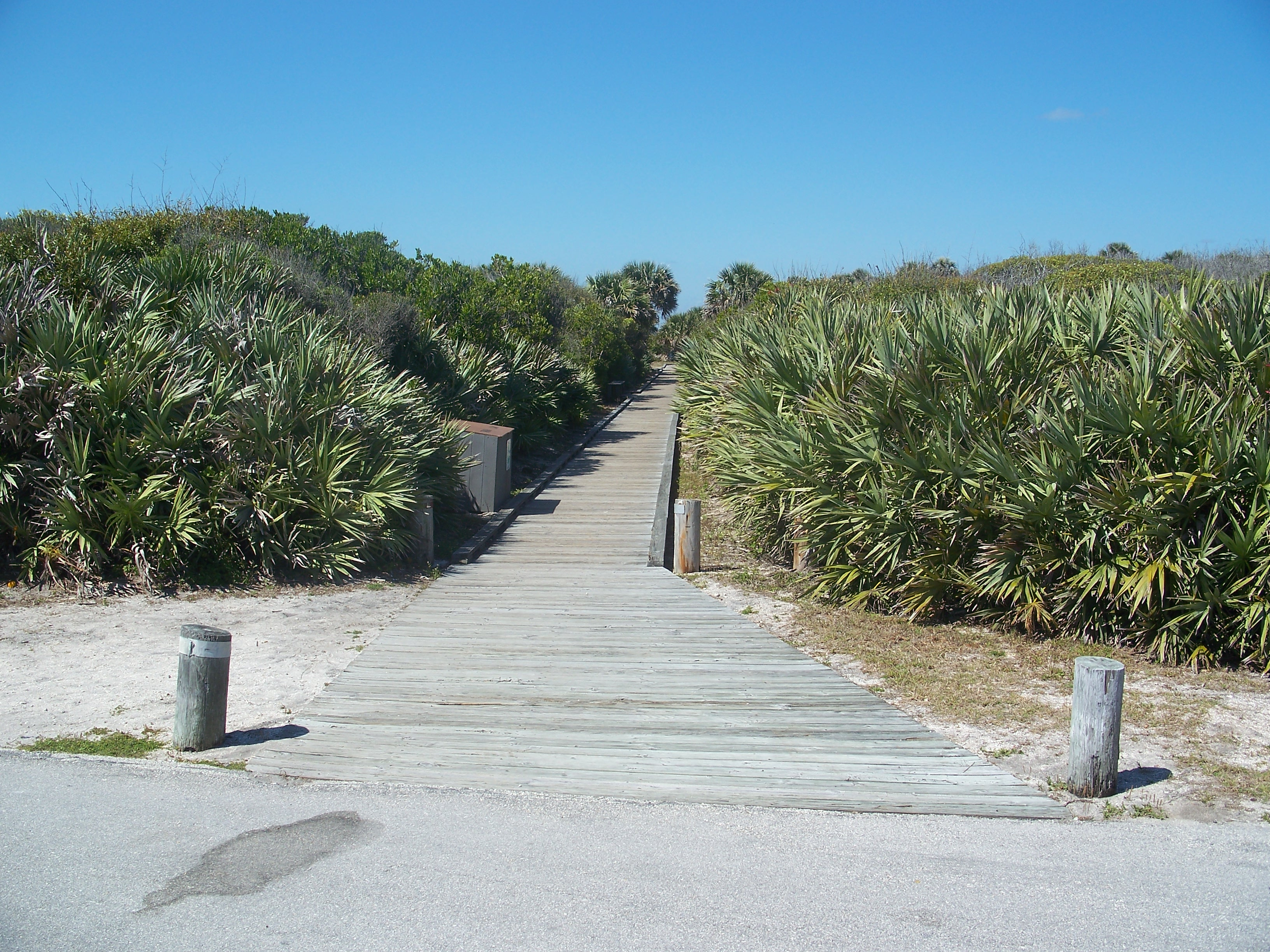
Walkway toward mound

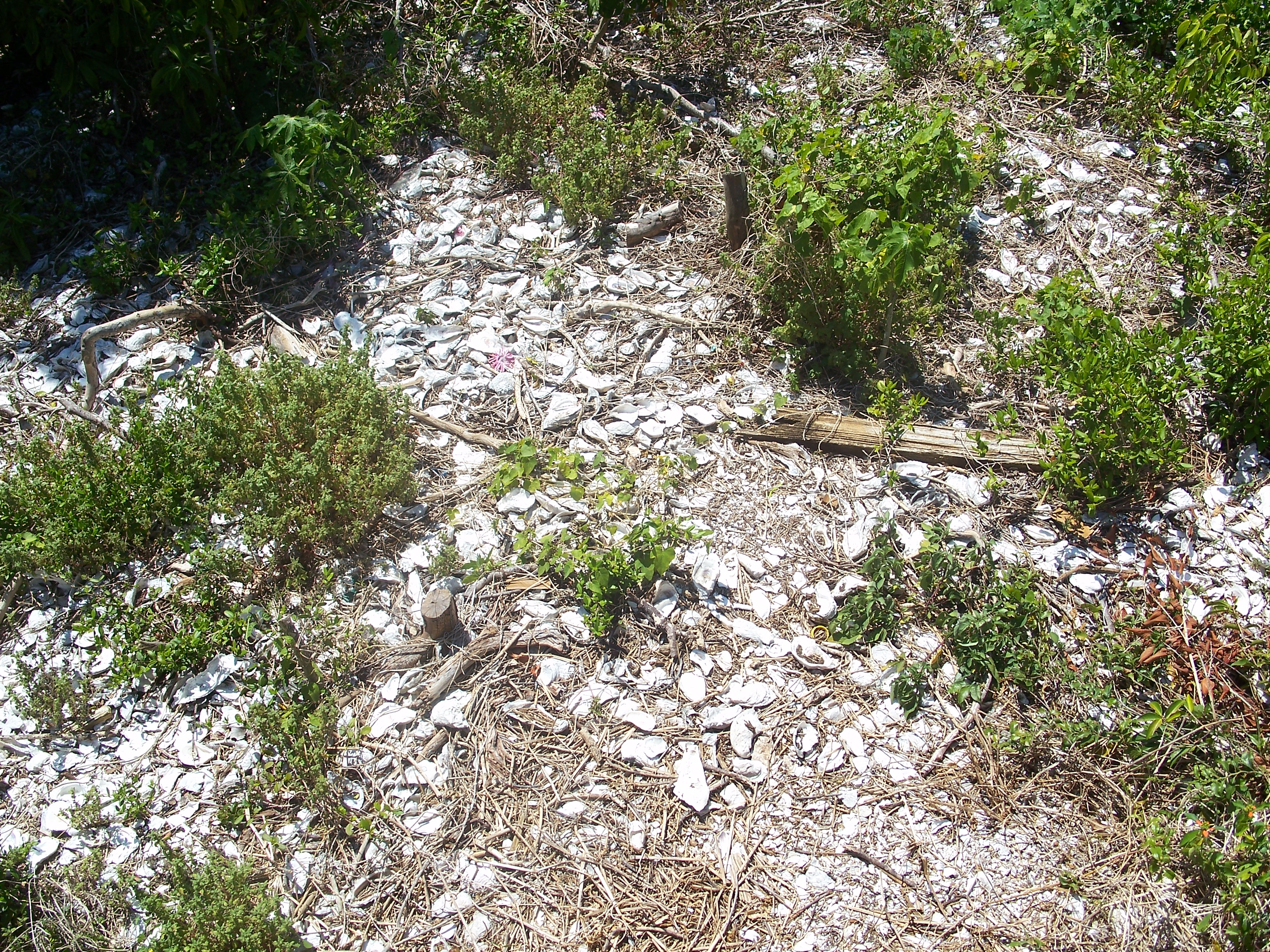
Shells visible through vegetation

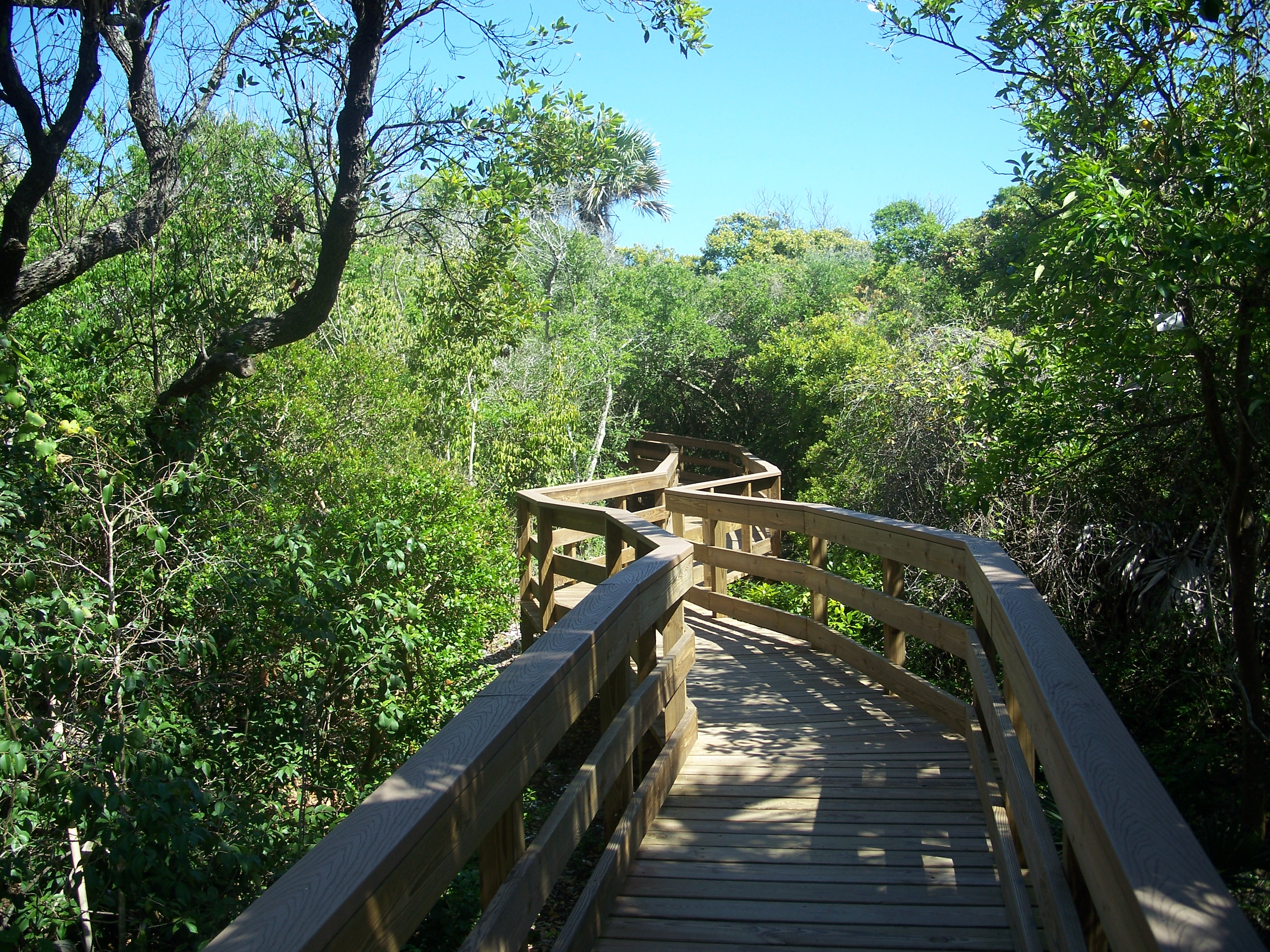
Path beneath trees

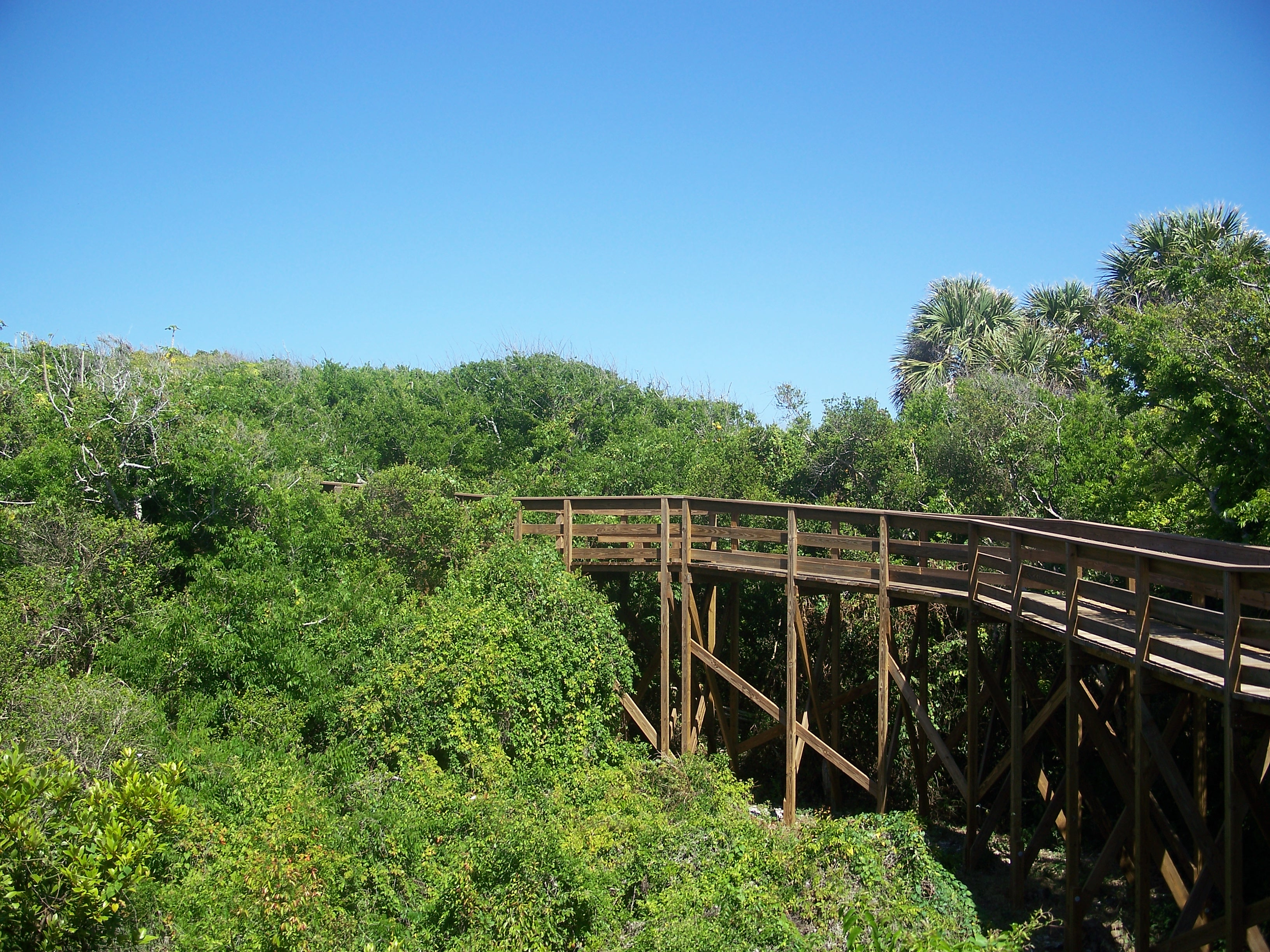
Boardwalk to top of mound

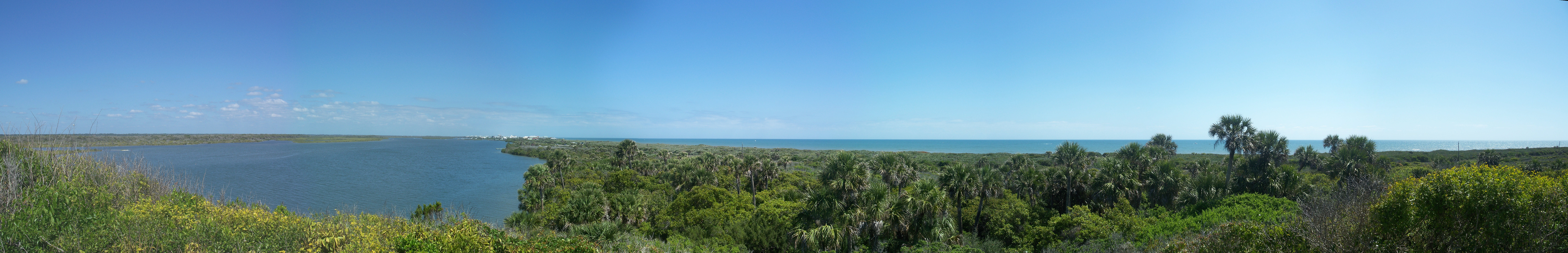
Panoramic view north

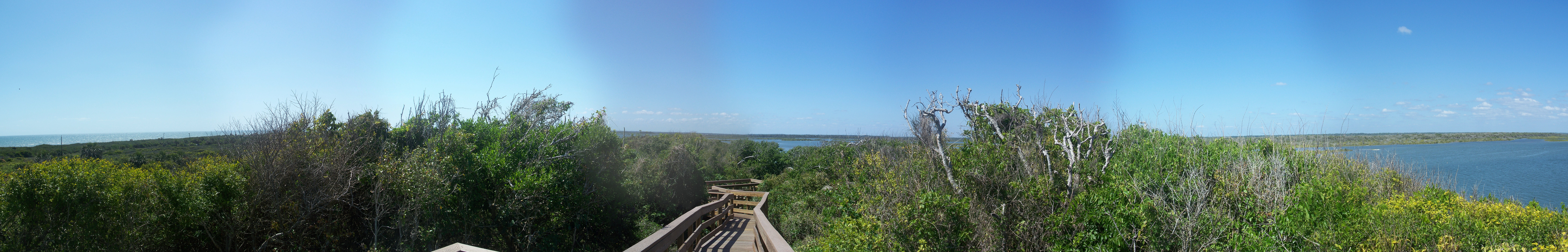
Panoramic view south

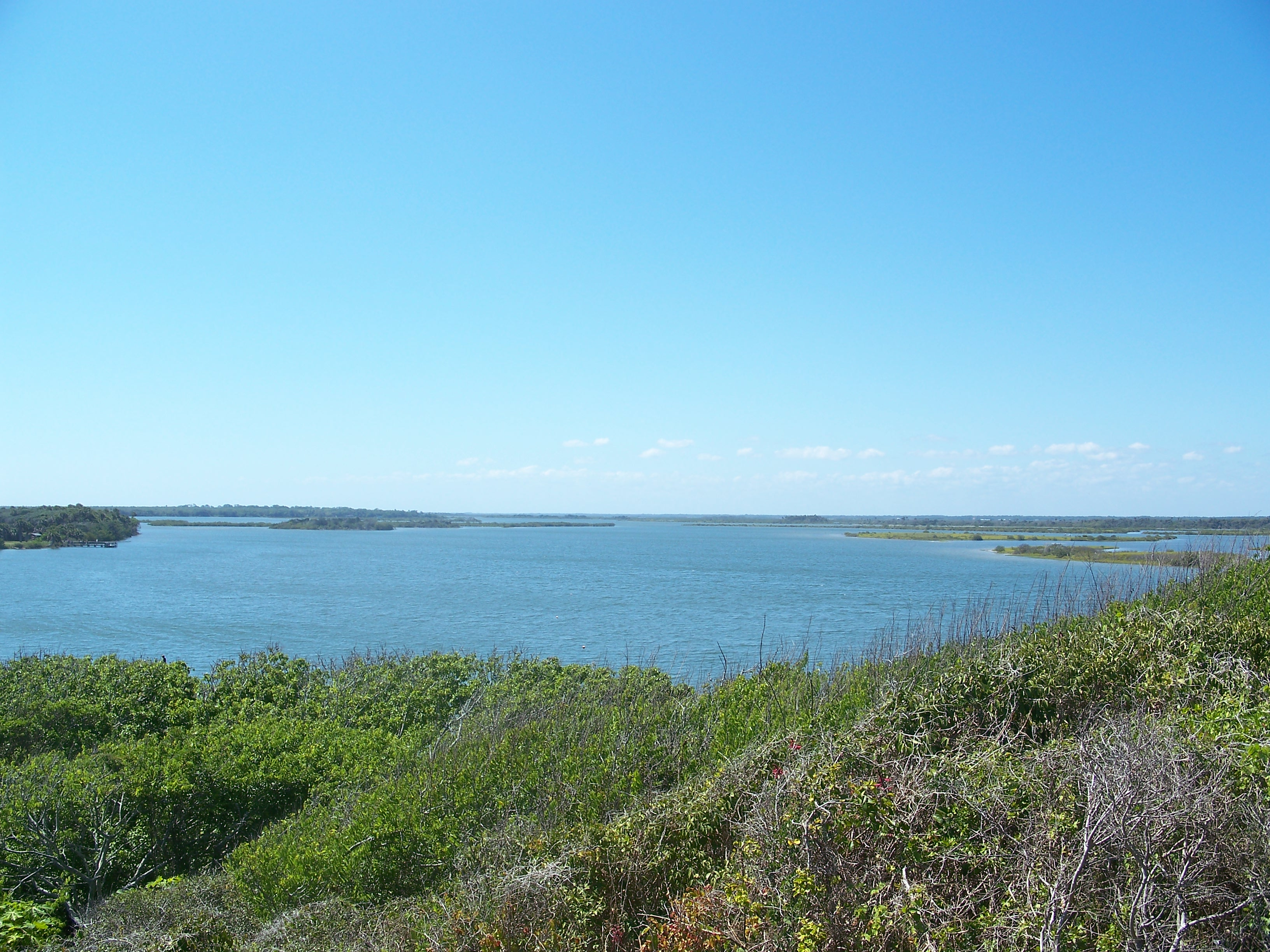
Looking west from top of mound

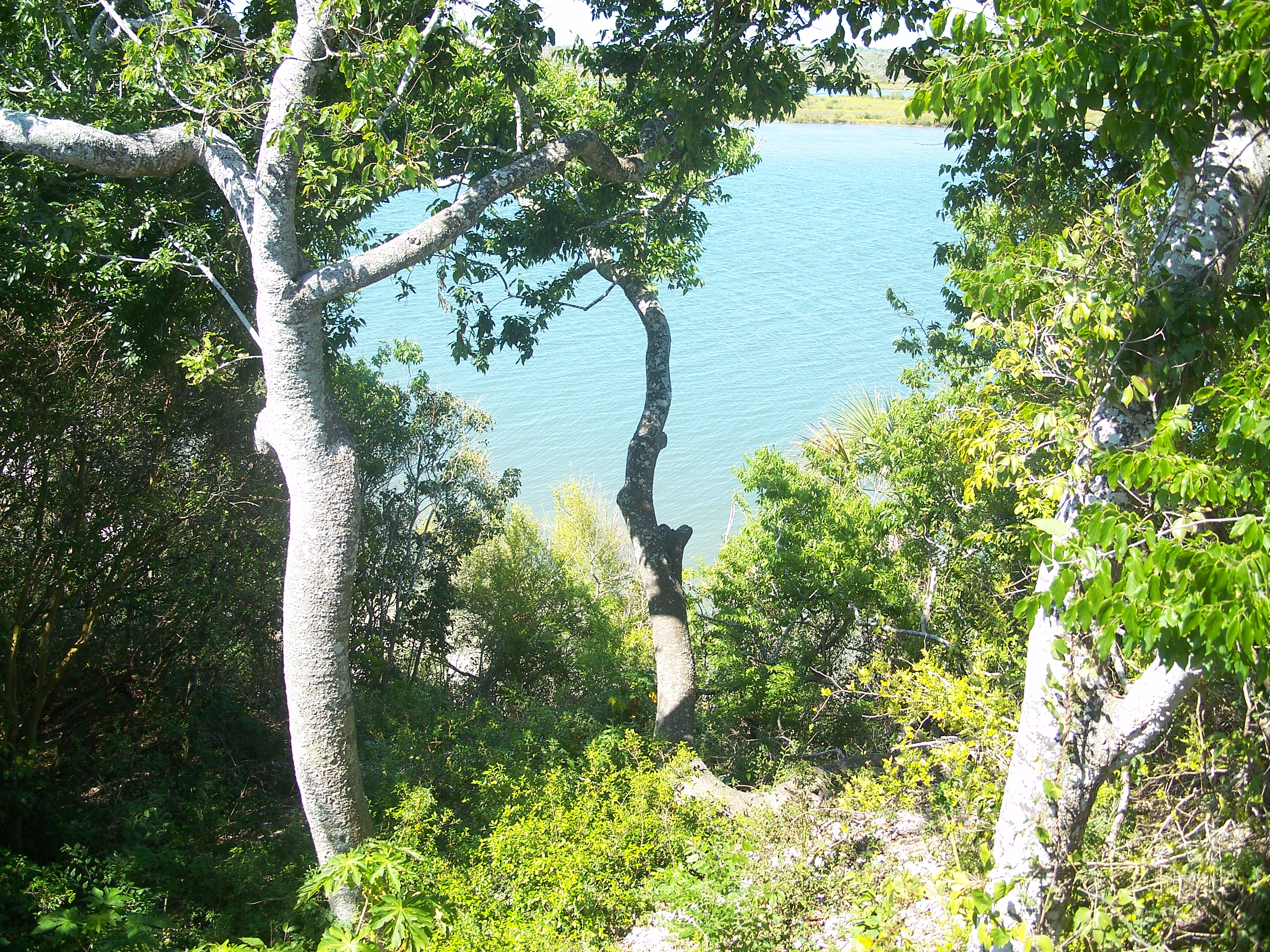
Mosquito Lagoon overlook

== Sources ==
- Milanich, Jerald T. (1998). Florida's Indians from Ancient Times to the Present. Gainesville, Florida: University Press of Florida. ISBN 0-8130-1599-5 – via Internet Archive.
- Norman, Eliane M. (1976). "An Analysis of Vegetation at Turtle Mound". Florida Scientist. 39 (1): 19–31. JSTOR 24312040.
- Small, John Kunkel (October 1923). "Green deserts and dead gardens". Journal of the New York Botanical Garden. 24 (286): 193–247 – via Biodiversity Heritage Library.
  - — (1927). "Among the floral aborigines". Journal of the New York Botanical Garden. 28: 25–40 – via Biodiversity Heritage Library.
  - — (2004) [1929]. From Eden to Sahara: Florida's Tragedy. Sanford, Florida: Seminole Soil and Water Conservation District. ISBN 0-9761215-0-6.
- Stalter, Richard; Kincaid, Dwight (January 2004). "The Vascular Flora of Five Florida Shell Middens". Journal of the Torrey Botanical Society. 131 (1). Torrey Botanical Society: 93–103. doi:10.2307/4126930. JSTOR 4126930.
- Swanton, John R. (1922). Early History of the Creek Indians and Their Neighbors. Washington, D.C.: Smithsonian Institution. LCCN 22026671 – via Internet Archive.
