= Otter Mound Preserve =

Shell mound nature preserve in Florida, USA

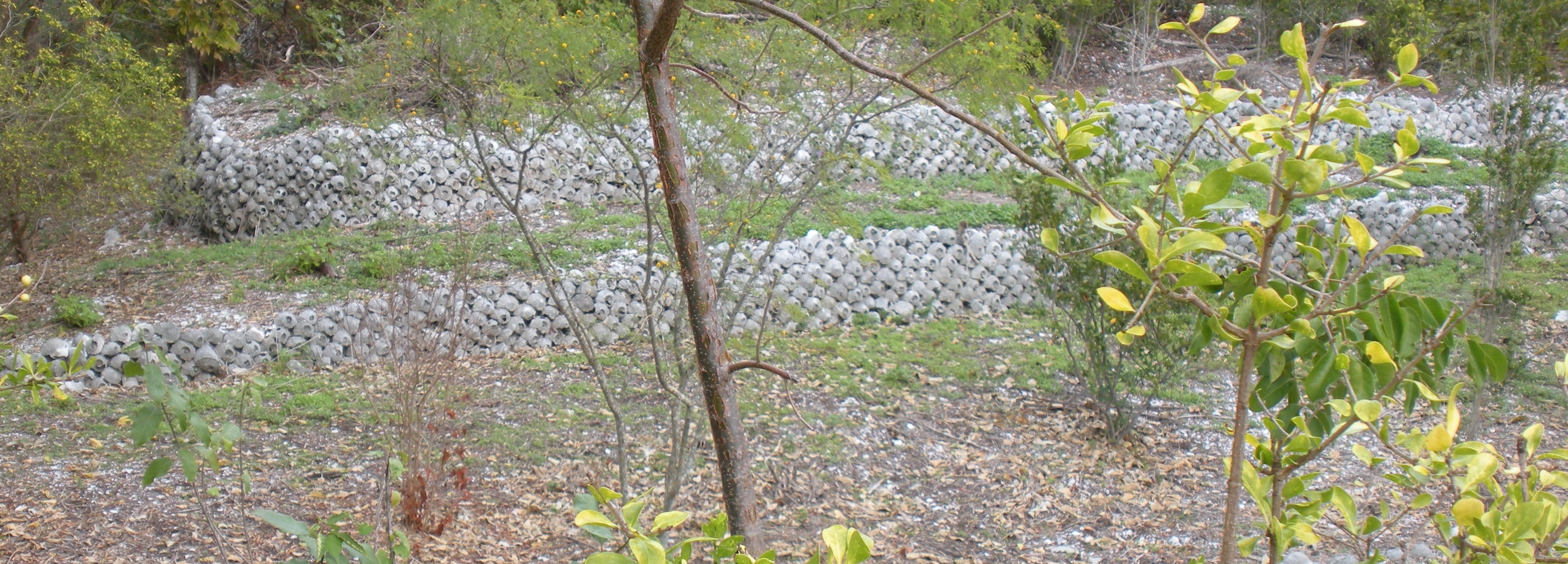
- Otter Mound
- Interactive map of Otter Mound Preserve
- Location: Marco Island, Florida
- Coordinates: 25.91173°N 81.69883°W
- Area: 2.45 acres (0.99 ha)
- Created: March 7, 2007
- Operator: Collier County
- Status: Open all year

Otter Mound is located at 1831 Addison Court, Marco Island, Florida, United States. The 2.45 acre preserve is located in southwestern Collier County in a residential area of Marco Island, known locally as the Indian Hills section. The preserve is maintained by Collier County.

The preserve is named for a previous resident, Ernest Otter a one-time owner who had occupied the property until 1997. Otter is credited for the unique whelk shell terraces that define the preserve’s signature man-made feature. The initial preserve was established with a 1.77 acre purchase in 2004 followed by an additional acquisition of .68 acres in 2007.

== History ==
Otter Mound and the property surrounding it was a home site for early settlers in the Caxambas Village who worked in the Marco Island clamming industry.

The "Mound" on which Otter Mound Preserve sits was constructed by the Calusa native inhabitants from oyster, southern surf clam, lightning whelk, and other shellfish species and dates between 700 AD – 1200 AD.

== Geography ==
Otter Mound is a man-made tropical hardwood hammock formed by the Shell mound created by the Calusa natives, this raised area produced an environment that resulted in a tropical hardwood hammock community. This plant community also occurs naturally in South Florida and is a common site in the Everglades. Hammocks primarily occur on the highest elevations (e.g., shell mounds) where flooding rarely occurs and are, therefore, prime areas for human habitation.

== Wildlife ==
This preserve is representative of a tropical hardwood hammock, Fifty-seven species of birds and one hundred and twenty-seven plant species have been recorded at Otter Mound Preserve. Other wildlife observed includes opossum, armadillo, raccoon, grey squirrel and even the occasional bobcat.

== Whelk shell terracing ==
Otter Mound's signature man-made feature is the many terraced garden plots created with thousands of whelk shells. Ernest Otter created these terraced gardens in the mid 1950s.

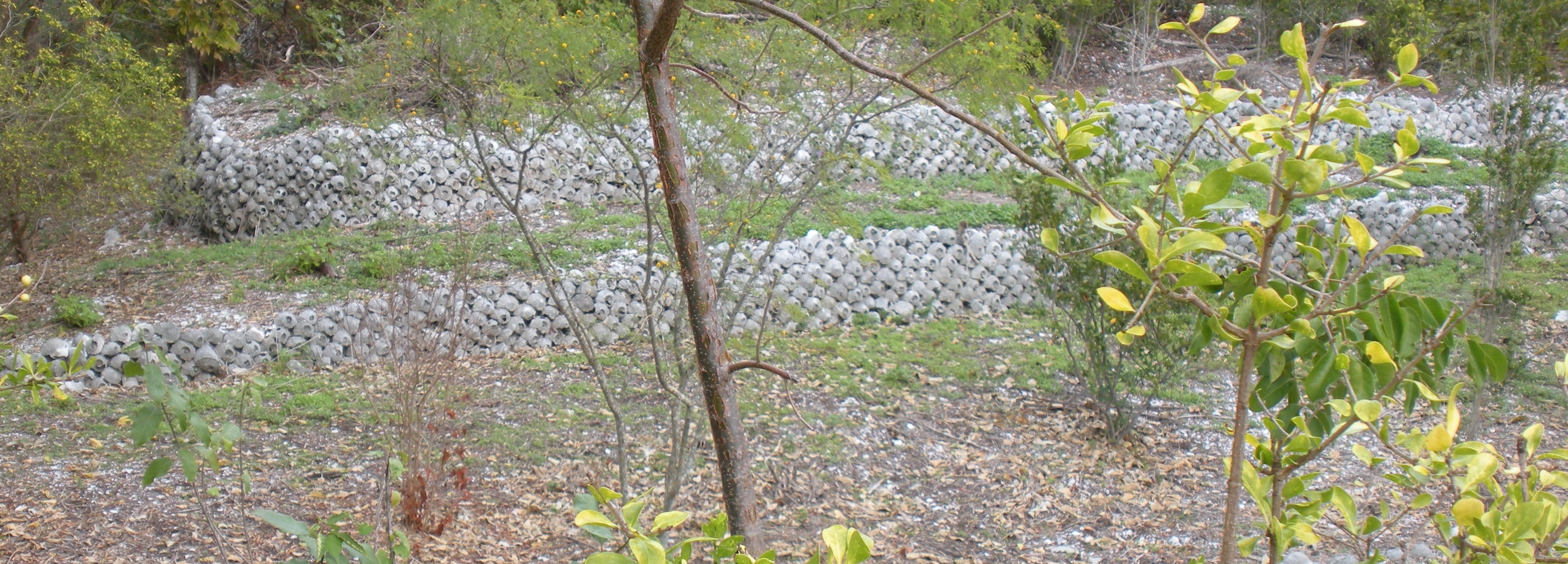
Some of the whelk shell terraces

== Public facilities ==
There is a small parking area and a bike rack located at the entrance along Addison Court. A nature surface trail with benches and interpretive signs loops through the preserve allowing views of the historic whelk terracing along its path. The path is not handicap accessible and there are no comfort facilities available.
