= Green Mound =

Archaeological site in Florida, United States

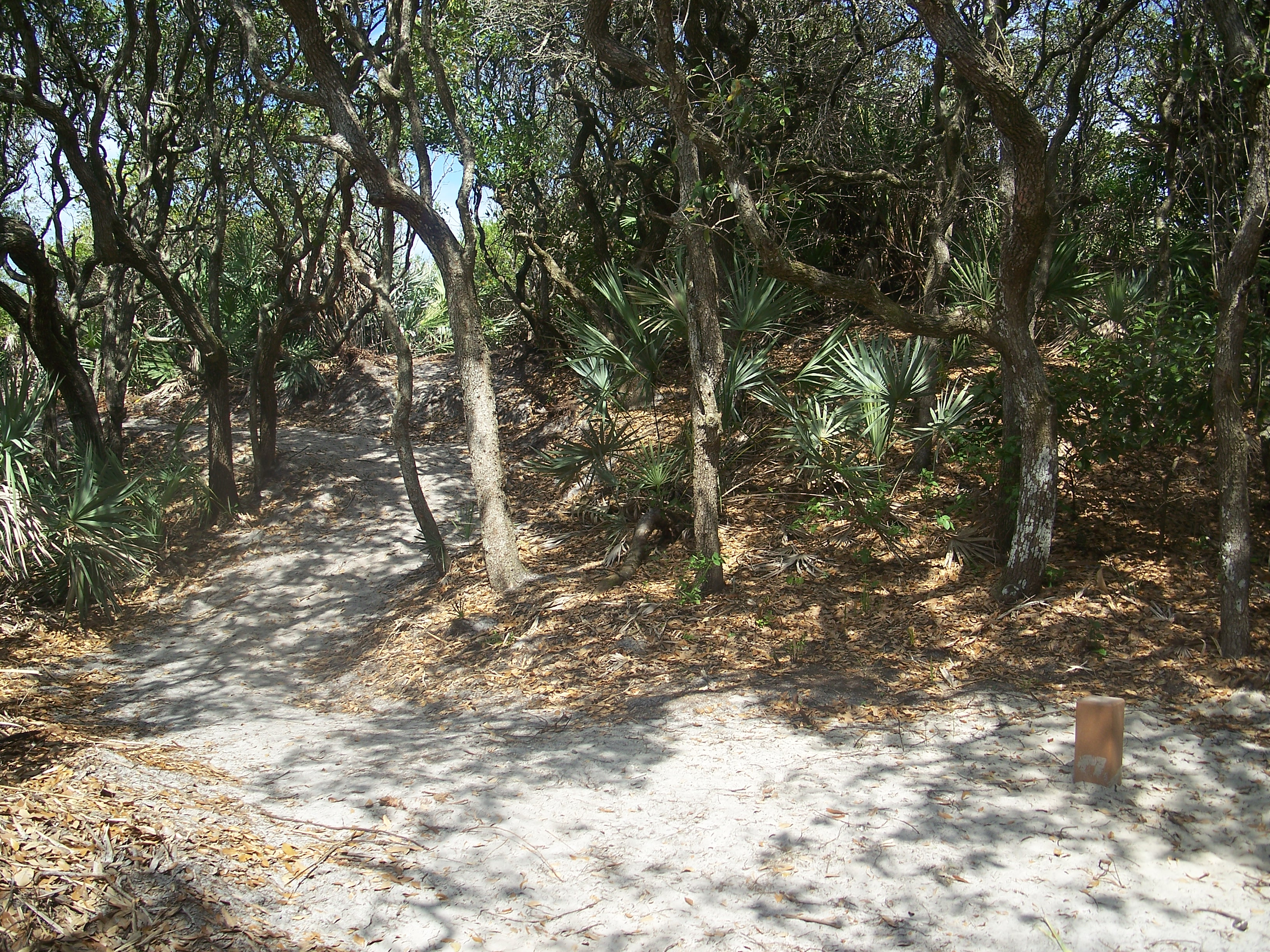

- Location within Volusia County
- 29°6′55″N 80°56′58″W
- Location: Volusia County, Florida
- Nearest city: Ponce Inlet, Florida

Site notes
- Governing body: Town of Ponce Inlet

Green Mound is one of the largest Pre-Columbian shell mounds, or shell middens, in the United States. Located in Ponce Inlet, Florida, the peak of the mound is the highest elevation in the small city.

== Characteristics ==
A report in 1871 called it "the highest point of land for several miles"—behind only Turtle Mound, another added in 1917. Along with the latter, Green Mound was a prominent marker at sea. In 1929 John Kunkel Small noted that the mound was composed mostly of clam, conch, and oyster shells, with "rarely a human skeleton", adding that it was "one of the higher shell-mounds"; he also mentioned the "largely tropical" plant taxa it shared with nearby mounds, including the heliotrope vine Tournefortia poliochros. While it once stood at 40 ft (12 m) above sea level, a combination of public works projects on the nearby roads and natural erosion have reduced the height of the mound by about 10 ft (3.0 m). Between 1927 and 1948, when it was acquired for conservation, extensive shell mining had stripped it of vegetation, along with over three-fourths of its volume.

== History ==
The mound was built by Native Americans of the late St. Johns II cultural period, as indicated by the finding of pre-Columbian "chalky ware" ceramics dating to later than 800 AD. These overlie earlier relics of the St. Johns I cultural period, the cultural period following the Archaic period. The St. Johns period was characterized by the introduction of mound-building and a more sedentary, rather than nomadic, lifestyle. The natives who once lived at this location were closely tied to both the nearby Atlantic Ocean and the resource-rich saltwater estuaries of the Halifax River immediately west of the mound. The mound formed from a combination of discarded oyster shells, clamshells, and other debris.

Whether or not the shell heaps scattered in coastal and riparian locations throughout Florida were natural deposits or of human origin remained a matter of debate in the mid-19th century, although Daniel Brinton had come to the conclusion by 1859 that the shell mounds on the east coast of Florida were the waste heaps of aboriginal groups that had accumulated over centuries. Initial studies of the Green Mound area were conducted in the early to mid-1940s by archaeologist John Griffin, who found that the mound was in fact inhabited by its builders and their subsequent generations. Later excavation revealed multiple layers of clay floors, remnants of structural components such as postholes, and evidence of ash, fire pits and hearths at the site. It is thought that the dwellings that sat upon the mound were constructed of materials such as palmetto limbs and other local forms of timber such as oak. It is also inferred that due to the social structure that existed at the time, the inhabitation of the mound's top was reserved for the highest-ranking members (elites) of the community. The most likely inhabitants of these prime locations on top of the mound would have been tribal chiefs and religious leaders. Depending on their social status, other members of the community would have lived in areas closer to ground level.

The mound was listed on the National Register of Historic Places in 2020.

== Gallery ==
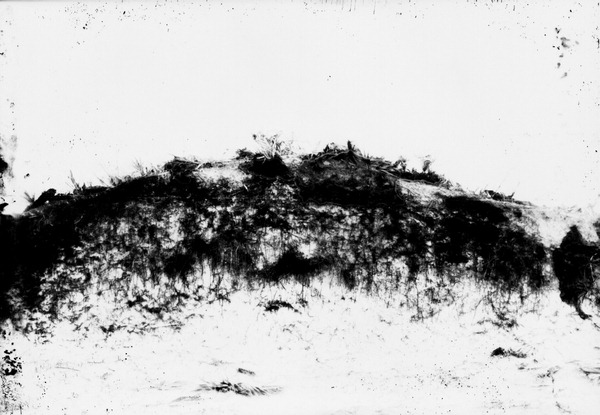
Dune near Green Mound in 1924

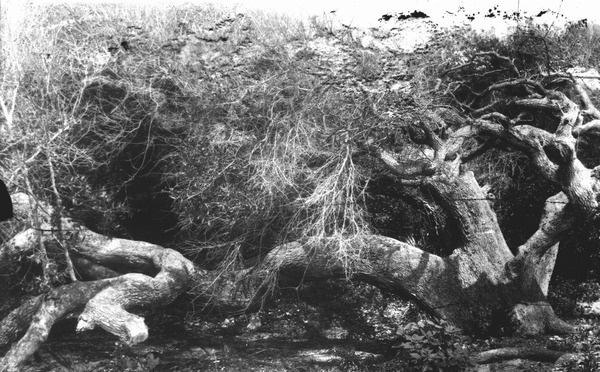
Oaks on the mound in 1922

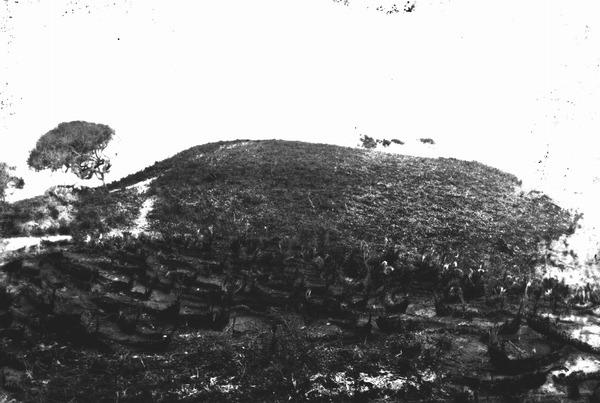
View of the mound in 1924

== Sources ==
- Bullen, Ripley P.; Sleight, Frederick W. (1971) [1960]. Archaeological investigations of Green Mound, Florida. American Studies (Technical report). American Studies Report. William L. Bryant Foundation. 2 – via Internet Archive.
- Goggin, John Mann (1952). Space and Time Perspective in Northern St. Johns Archeology, Florida. Gainesville: University Press of Florida. ISBN 978-0-8130-1634-4 – via Google Books.
- Griffin, John W.; Griffin, Patricia C. (1996). Fifty Years of Southeastern Archaeology: Selected Works of John W. Griffin. Gainesville: University Press of Florida. ISBN 978-0-8130-1420-3 – via Google Books.
- Small, John Kunkel (2004) [1929]. From Eden to Sahara: Florida's Tragedy. Sanford, Florida: Seminole Soil and Water Conservation District. ISBN 0-9761215-0-6.
- Stalter, Richard; Kincaid, Dwight (January 2004). "The Vascular Flora of Five Florida Shell Middens". Journal of the Torrey Botanical Society. 131 (1). Torrey Botanical Society: 93–103. doi:10.2307/4126930. JSTOR 4126930.
