= Savannas Preserve State Park =

Florida State Park

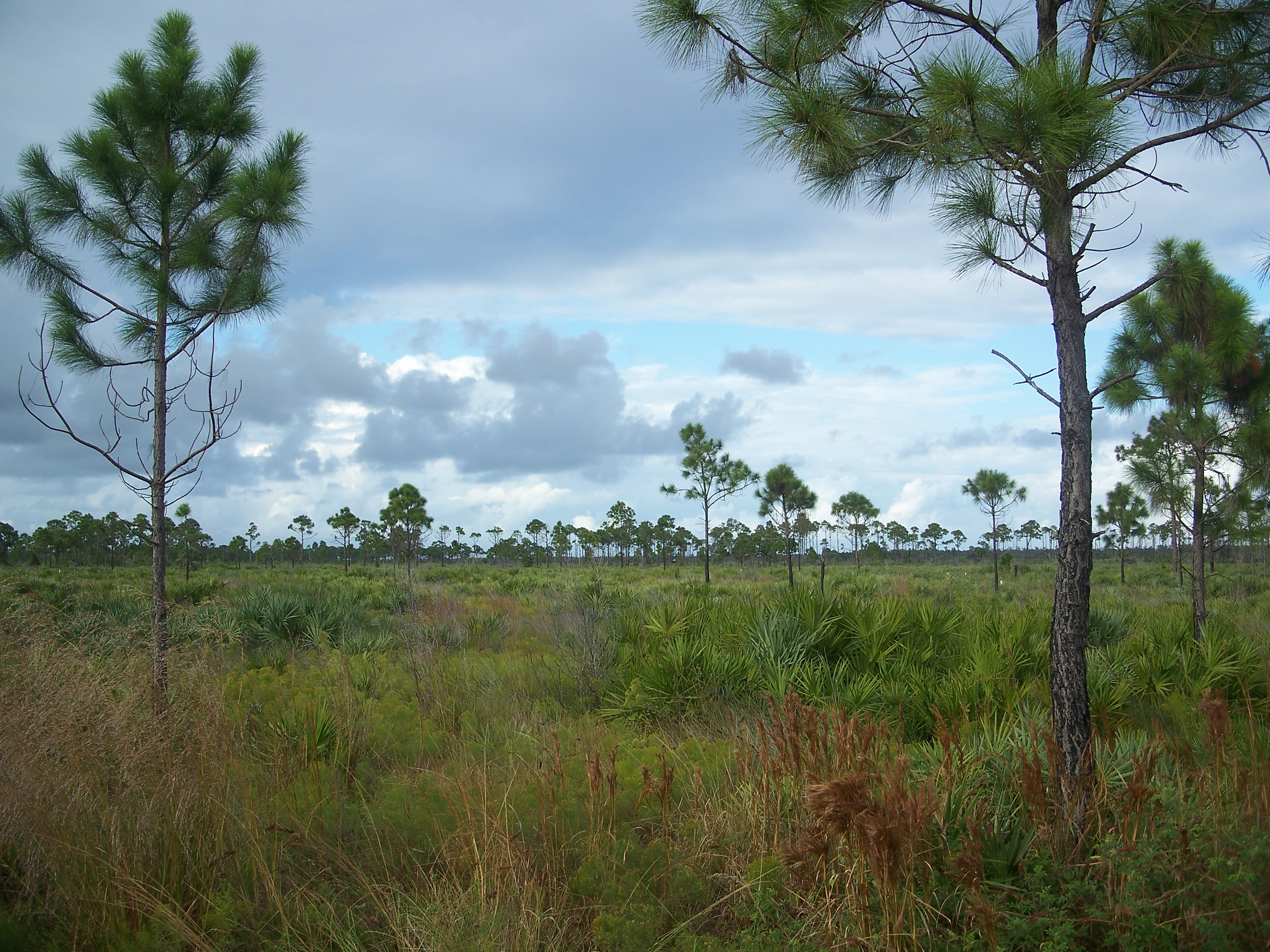
- A view of the Preserve on an overcast day

- Location within Florida Location within the United States
- Interactive map of Savannas Preserve State Park
- Location: St. Lucie County, Florida, United States
- Nearest city: Fort Pierce, Port St. Lucie and Jensen Beach, Florida
- Coordinates: 27°22′44″N 80°18′16″W
- Governing body: Florida Department of Environmental Protection

Savannas Preserve State Park is a Florida State Park, located along much of the Atlantic Coast between Fort Pierce and Jensen Beach. Savannas Preserve also has a group of youth volunteers, the Junior Friends of Savannas Preserve State Park.

== General ==
Savannas Preserve State Park is predominantly a savanna; open grasslands with sparse South Florida slash pine trees. The park is made up of pine flatwoods, basin marsh, scrubby flatwoods, wet prairie and the Atlantic scrub ridge. Protecting southeast Florida's largest freshwater marsh, the Savannas Preserve State Park manages over 7,000 acres. It is home to many species, most notably: the threatened Florida scrub jay and gopher tortoise, the American alligator, and the sandhill crane. The park is also the home to a rare plant that only grows in the Savannas Preserve State Park in the world, the savannas mint.

The Savannas Education Center has live exhibits, a gift shop, self-guided tour booklets, and information on many of Florida's State Parks. Interpretive guided tours and canoe/kayak trips are offered by the Friends of Savannas Preserve State Park (a nonprofit citizens' support organization).

Fishing is allowed, there is an equestrian entrance, and biking is permitted (although difficult because of the sand). The park also has nearly 13 miles (21 km) of public trails from Jensen Beach Blvd to Easy Street.

This park contains nearly all of the remaining populations of the fragrant prickly-apple (Harrisia fragrans), an endangered cactus species.

The main entrance to Savannas Preserve State Park is located at 2541 SE Walton Road, Port St. Lucie, Florida 34952.
