= Atlantic Center for the Arts =

Art center in New Smyrna Beach, Florida

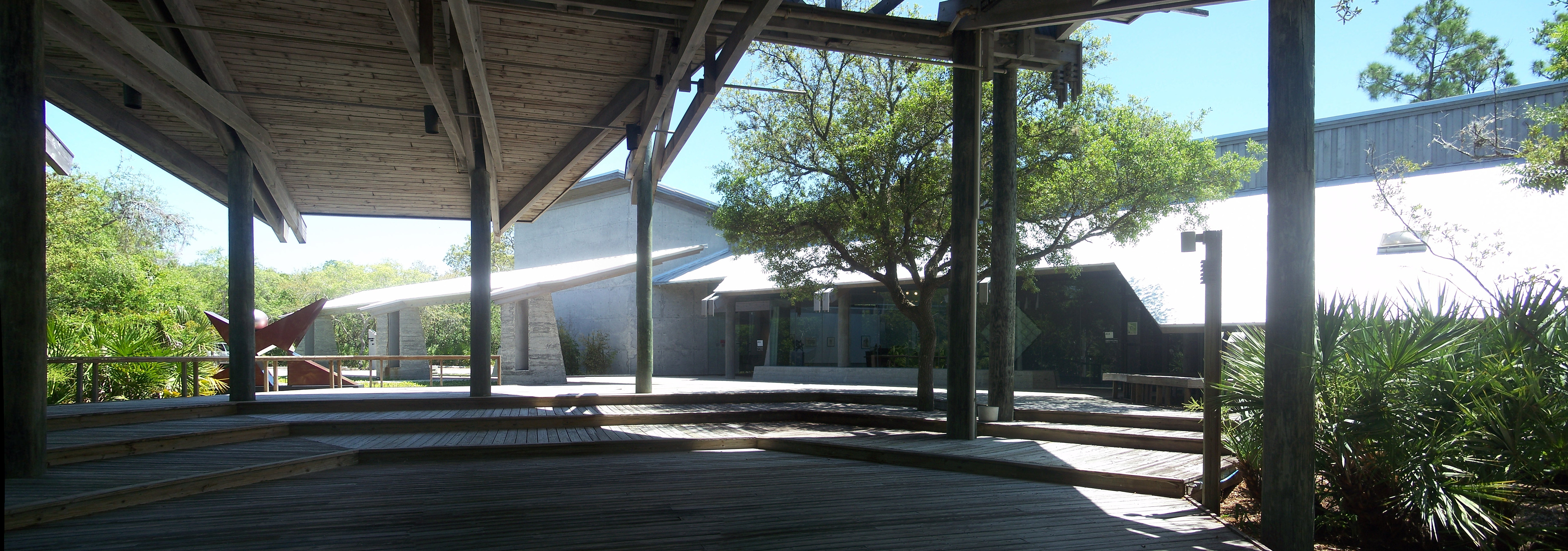

- Volusia County, Florida
- Established: 1982
- Location: 1414 Art Center Avenue; New Smyrna Beach, Florida
- Coordinates: 29.070924°N 80.962295°W
- Type: Art
- Founder: Doris Leeper
- Directors: Jennifer McInnes Coolidge, Executive Director
- Public transit access: VOTRAN
- Website: www.atlanticcenterforthearts.org

Atlantic Center for the Arts (ACA) is a nonprofit, interdisciplinary artists' community and education facility located in New Smyrna Beach, Florida. The complex was designed by the Boston-based firm Thompson and Rose Architects.

Atlantic Center has been the starting point for new works which go on to be shown at national museums and performance centers such as the Metropolitan Opera, Lincoln Center for the Performing Arts, the Spoleto Festival, Jacob's Pillow, the Walker Art Center, the Brooklyn Academy of Music, the Museum of Modern Art, and Bang on a Can.

== History ==
Local artist and environmentalist Doris Leeper was instrumental in the founding of the ACA.

Leeper first conceived of the ACA in 1977 as a Florida artist-in-residence program in which artists of all disciplines could work with current prominent artists in a supportive and creative environment. Leeper saw the potential for an artist's residency as a place for ideas to be created, shared, and come into fruition. Leeper soon persuaded friends and community members to join in her vision. In 1979, she convinced the Rockefeller Foundation to provide a challenge grant that soon was matched. This $25,000 in seed money was the unofficial inception of the ACA.

When a prime piece of property became available on the shores of Turnbull Bay, a tidal estuary west of New Smyrna Beach, Leeper raised the $50,000 necessary to buy the ten-acre plot. Three years later, five main buildings were completed. Over the years, five more buildings were constructed and an additional 59 acres were purchased as preserve land.

In 1997, the Leeper Studio Complex, designed by Thompson and Rose Architects, was completed.

== Facilities ==
=== Pabst Visitor Center & Gallery ===
The Pabst Visitor Center is part of the ACA headquarters at 1414 Art Center Avenue, in New Smyrna Beach. The Visitor Center includes several public art galleries. The Jean G. Harris History Gallery features a permanent exhibit about the history and work of the Atlantic Center for the Arts. The Mentoring Artist Gallery features changing exhibits by ACA Mentoring Artists and other themed shows. The Jack Mitchell Portrait Gallery displays photographic portraits of ACA Mentoring Artists from 1982 to 2004. The Visitor Center also features a gift shop, and a 500-foot public art and nature trail.

=== Leeper Studio Complex ===
Comprising six buildings connected to existing structures by raised wooden walkways, the Leeper Studio Complex includes a library and studios for painting, sculpture, dance, music/recording, and theater. The studio complex added 12,000 sq. ft. of artists' working space to the existing campus and also provides additional facilities for public programs and partnerships.

== Programs ==
=== Mentoring Artists-in-Residence Program ===
The ACA Mentoring Artists-in-Residence Program was designed to bring together internationally acclaimed mentoring artists from different disciplines with talented artists who are selected by the mentor. Since 1982, over 155 three-week-long interdisciplinary residencies have taken place at the Atlantic Center, featuring over 430 Mentoring Artists and over 3,500 Associate Artists from around the world. (The first residency, in 1982, was with author James Dickey, sculptor Duane Hanson and composer David Del Tredici.)

=== Community Art Programs ===
In 1991, Atlantic Center for the Arts at Harris House opened and the community arts program had its beginning. Located in the heart of a revitalized downtown, an historic home was converted to a cultural community center that since its inception has assumed a leadership role in providing arts education programs for children and cultural enrichment for adults. ACA at Harris House has exhibition space devoted solely to Florida artists.

=== IMAGES: A Festival of the Arts ===
IMAGES is a free, public art festival that offers $30,000 in cash awards to artists and has one of the best Patron Programs in the Southeast. Visitors enjoy the work of over 225 artists, gourmet food trucks, live entertainment, Creative Education activities for children, and much more.

== Gallery ==
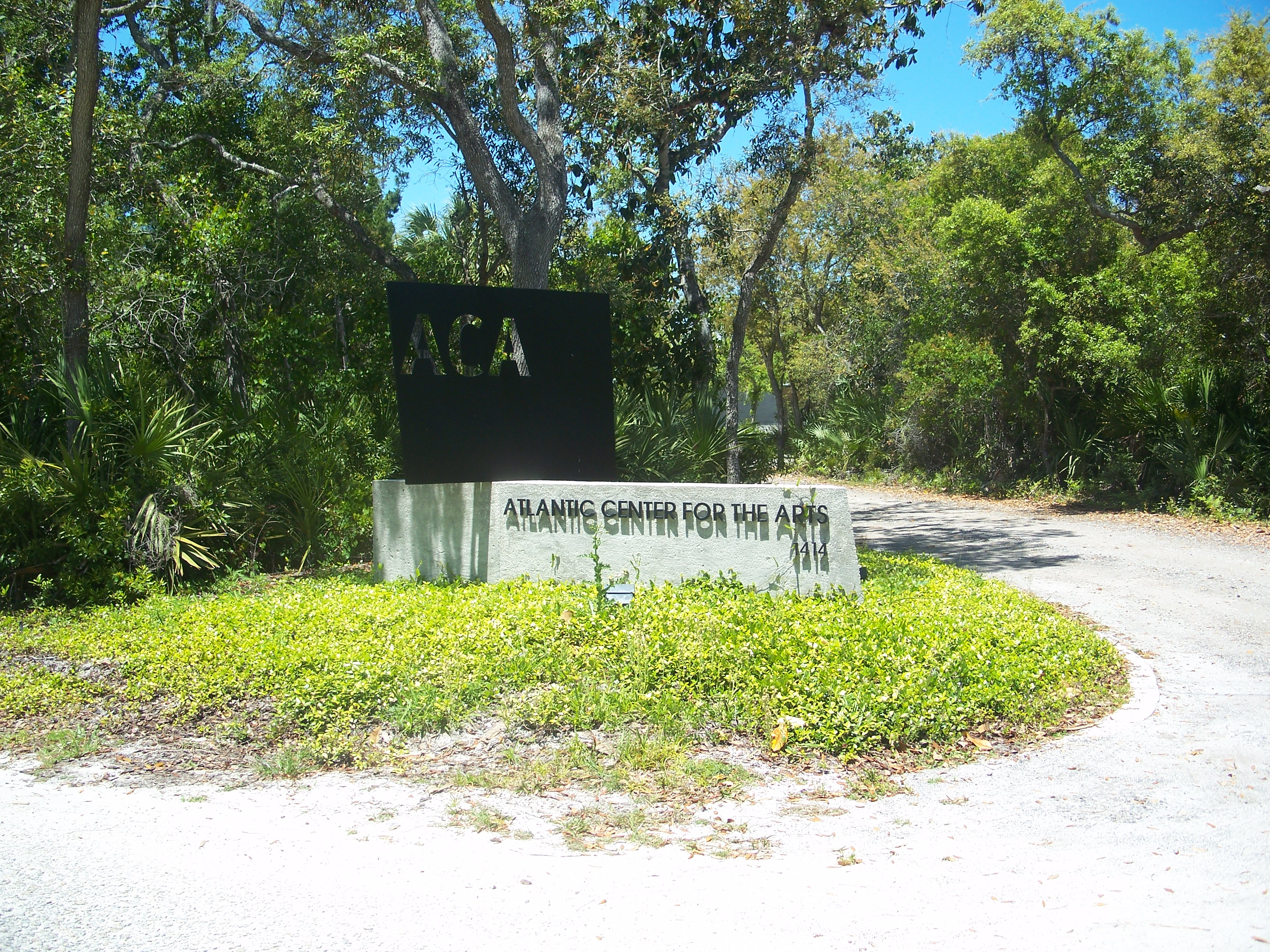
Entrance

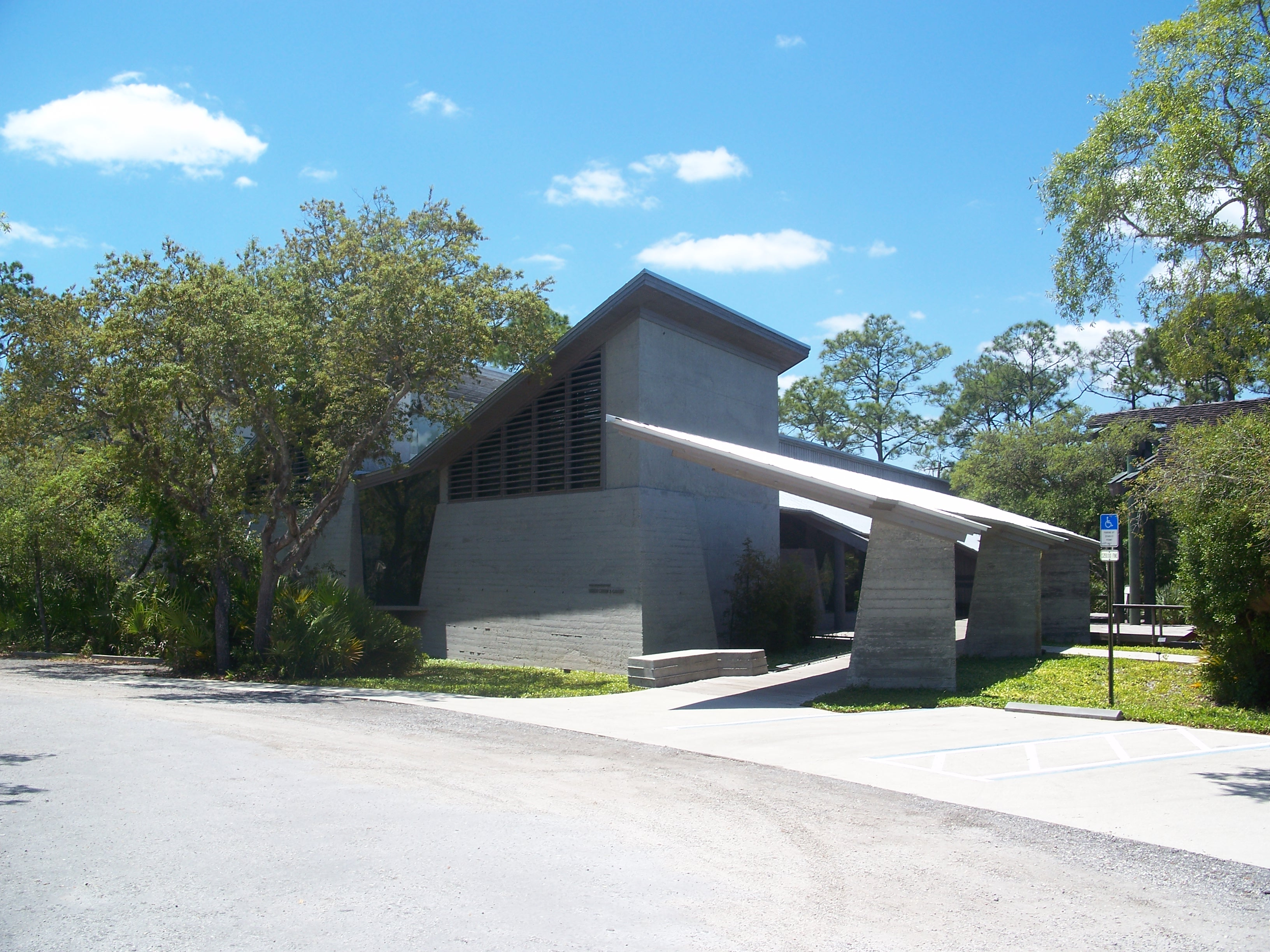
Pabst Visitor Center and Gallery

== Sources ==
- Laura Stewart (2008-01-25). "Atlantic Center for the Arts breaks boundaries". Daytona Beach News Journal Online.
- Jack Mitchell (July 2003). "Dance scape - the Atlantic Center for the Arts". Dance Magazine. 77 (7). Archived from the original on March 24, 2005.
