= Midden =

Old dump for domestic waste

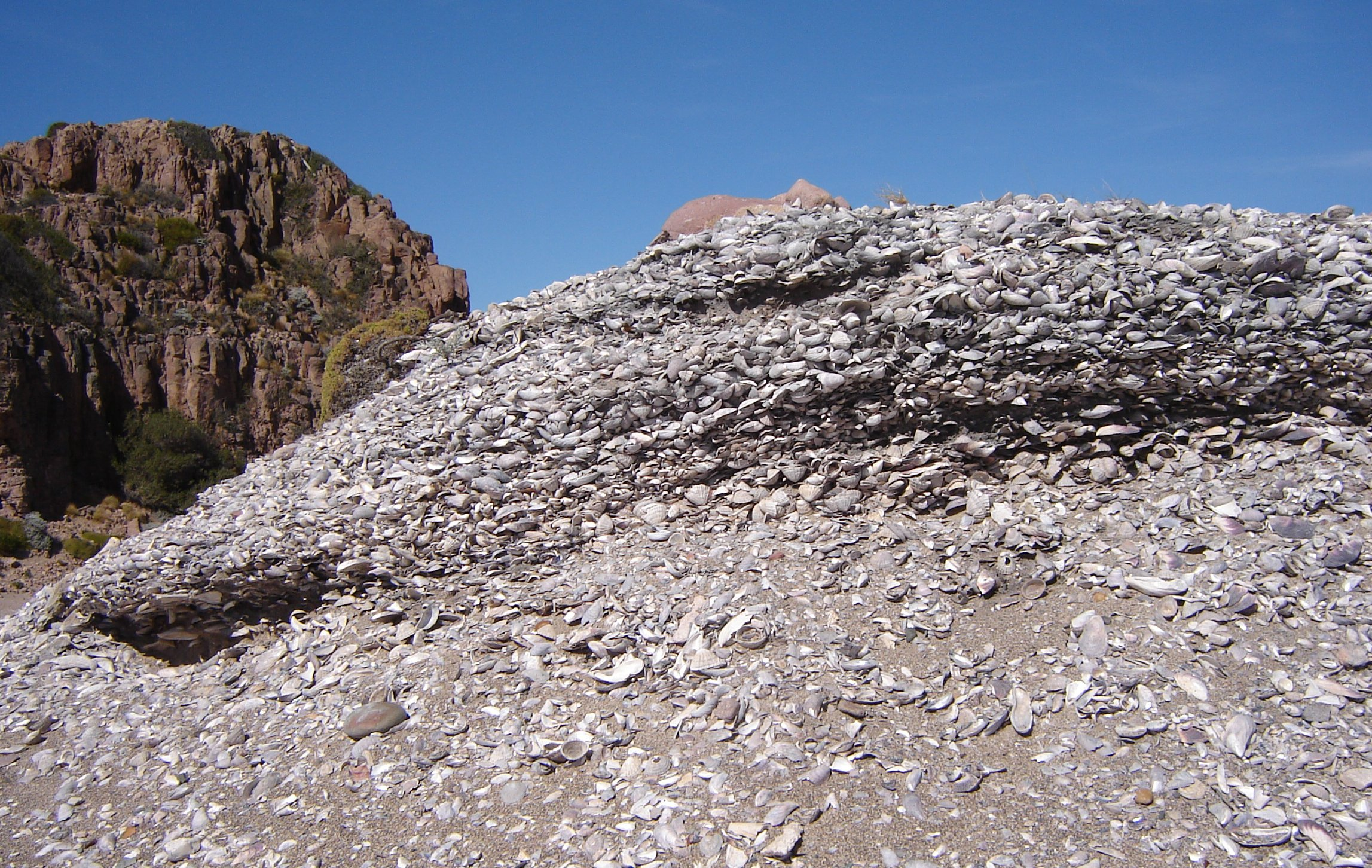
A closeup of a shell midden in Santa Cruz Province, Argentina

A midden (Note: Also known as a kitchen midden or shell heap.) is an old dump for domestic waste. It may consist of animal bones, human excrement, botanical material, mollusc shells, potsherds, lithics (especially debitage), and other artifacts and biofacts associated with past human occupation.

These features provide a useful resource for archaeologists to study the diets and habits of past societies. Middens with damp, anaerobic conditions can even preserve organic remains in deposits as the debris of daily life are tossed on the pile. Each individual toss will contribute a different mix of materials depending upon the activity associated with that particular toss. During the course of deposition, sediment is deposited as well. Different mechanisms, from wind and water to animal digs, create a matrix which can also be analysed to provide seasonal and climatic information. In some middens individual dumps of material can be discerned and analysed.

== Shells ==
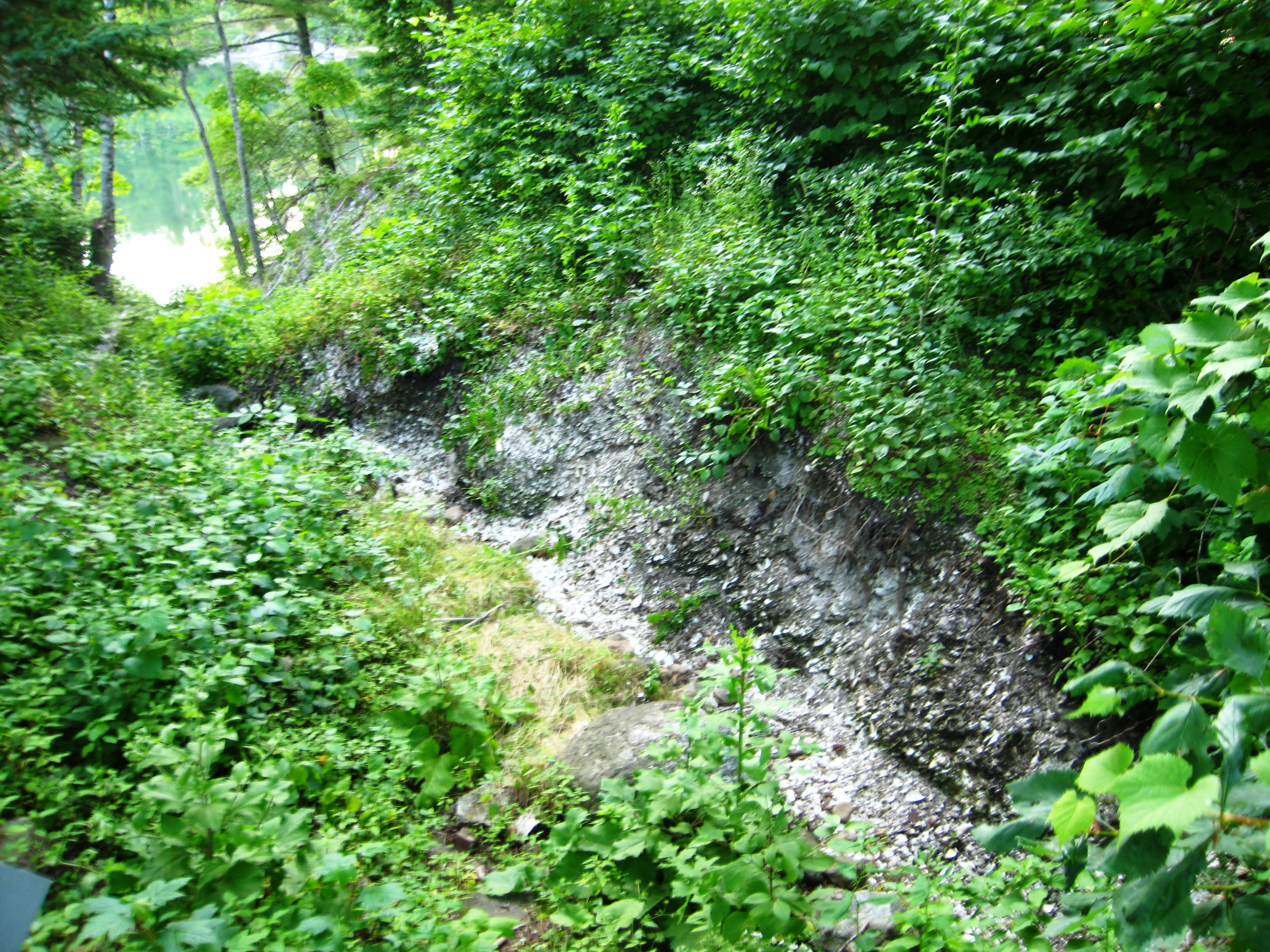
The Whaleback Shell Midden in Maine resulted from oyster harvesting from 200 BCE to 1000 CE.

A shell midden or shell mound is an archaeological feature consisting mainly of mollusc shells. The Danish term køkkenmøddinger (plural) was first used by Japetus Steenstrup to describe shell heaps and continues to be used by some researchers. A midden, by definition, contains the debris of human activity, and should not be confused with wind- or tide-created beach mounds. Some shell middens are processing remains: areas where aquatic resources were processed directly after harvest and prior to use or storage in a distant location.

Certain shell middens are linked directly to villages, serving as designated dump sites. In other cases, the materials found in the middens are closely tied to individual houses within the village, where each household would dispose of its waste right outside their home. Regardless of their association, shell middens are highly intricate and challenging to excavate completely and accurately. The fact that they contain a detailed record of what food was eaten or processed and many fragments of stone tools and household goods makes them invaluable objects of archaeological study.

Shells have a high calcium carbonate content, which tends to make the middens alkaline. This slows the normal rate of decay caused by soil acidity, leaving a relatively high proportion of organic material (food remnants, organic tools, clothing, human remains) available for archaeologists to find.

Edward Sylvester Morse conducted one of the first archaeological excavations of the Ōmori Shell Mounds in Tokyo, Japan in 1877, which led to the discovery of a style of pottery described as "cord-marked", translated as "Jōmon", which came to be used to refer to the period of Japanese prehistory when this style of pottery was produced. Shell middens were studied in Denmark in the latter half of the 19th century. The Danish word køkkenmødding (kitchen mound) is now used internationally. The English word "midden" (waste mound) derives from the same Old Norse word that produced the modern Danish one.

=== Examples ===
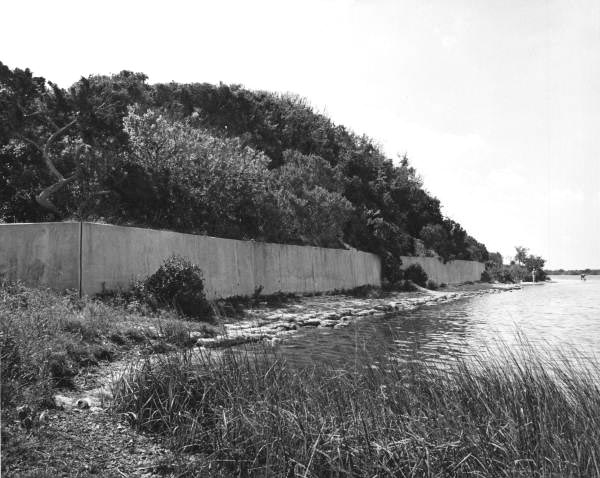
The Turtle Mound shell midden, in Florida, is the largest on the US East Coast.

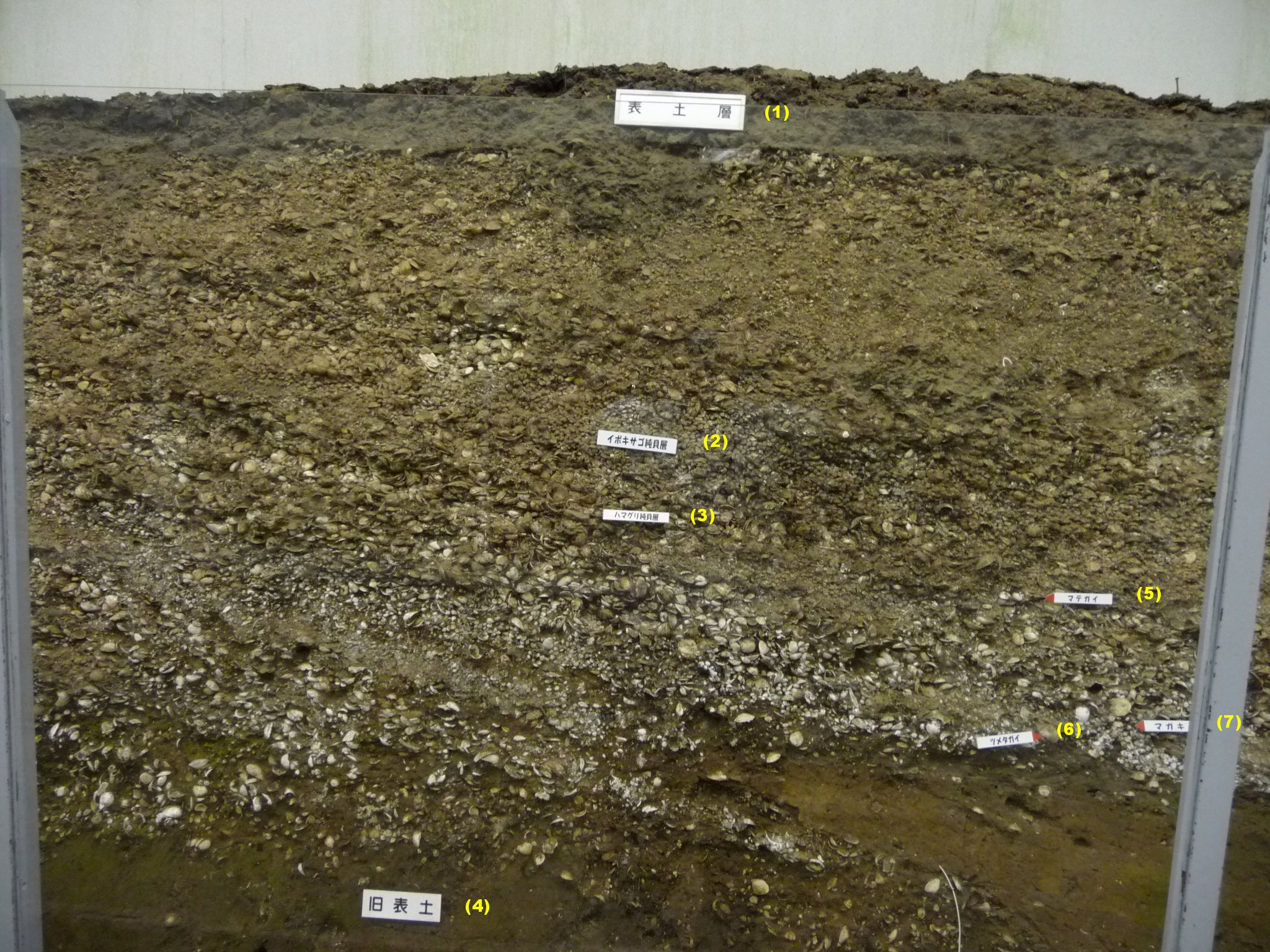
Shell midden in Kasori Shell Mound, Chiba, Chiba Prefecture Japan

Shell middens are found in coastal or lakeshore zones all over the world. Consisting mostly of mollusc shells, most are believed to be the waste products of meals eaten by nomadic groups or hunting parties. Some are small, produced by a handful of people, while others are many metres in length and width and represent centuries of shell deposition.

In Brazil, these sambaquis were created between the 7th millennium BCE and the beginning of European colonisation. The country holds the world's biggest known midden at the Jaguaruna archaeological site, 31 meters tall and 300 meters wide.

European shell middens are primarily found along the Atlantic seaboard and in Denmark and primarily date to the 5th millennium BCE (Ertebølle and Early Funnel Beaker cultures), containing the remains of the earliest Neolithisation process (pottery, cereals and domestic animals). Younger shell middens are found in Latvia (associated with Comb Ware ceramics), Sweden (associated with Pitted Ware ceramics), the Netherlands (associated with Corded Ware ceramics) and Schleswig-Holstein (Late Neolithic and Iron Age). All these are examples where communities practised a mixed farming and hunting/gathering economy.

In 2025, IIT Gandhinagar researchers uncovered shell midden sites in Kutch, India, revealing that hunter-gatherer communities lived there at least 5,000 years before the Harappans. These sites, with discarded shells and stone tools, show that early coastal communities adapted to mangrove environments and relied on marine resources. This discovery suggests a gradual, locally rooted cultural evolution, challenging the idea that Kutch's urbanism was externally influenced only by Sindh.

On Canada's west coast, some shell middens run for more than 1 kilometre (0.6 mi) along the coast and are several meters deep.

Shell middens created by Indigenous Australians are found in coastal regions of Australia, and are generally protected from mining and other developments. There are good examples on the Freycinet Peninsula in Tasmania where wave action combines charcoal from forest fire debris with a mix of shells into masses that storms deposit above high-water mark. Shell mounds near Weipa in far north Queensland are mostly less than 2 metres (6.6 ft) high (although ranging up to 10 metres (33 ft) high). Some, a few tens of metres long are claimed to be middens, but are in fact shell cheniers (beach ridges) re-worked by nest mound-building birds. Some shell middens are regarded as sacred sites, linked to the Dreamtime, such as those of the Anbarra group of the Burarra people of Arnhem Land.

In the California San Francisco Bay Area, the Ohlone and Coast Miwok peoples built more than 425 shell mounds over thousands of years. These mounds were used as burial sites, ceremonial places, cemeteries, and places of prayer. Some were later rediscovered by accident during construction, mining, or farming. The Emeryville Shellmound between Oakland and Berkeley, estimated to have been 60 feet high and 350 feet in diameter, was demolished in 1924. The Huichuin mound in Berkeley was 20 feet high and was the site of the first human settlement on the shores of San Francisco Bay. The West Berkeley and Ellis Landing mounds measured almost 200 meters in diameter and rose 9 meters above the shoreline.

Shell mounds create tropical hardwood hammocks such as the Otter Mound Preserve in Florida, where shell deposits from Calusa natives provided flood-free areas in otherwise watered areas.

Some shell middens may have doubled as areas of ceremonial construction or ritual significance, such as the Woodland period Crystal River site.

Some shell mounds, known as shell rings, are circular or open arcs with a clear central area. Many are known from Japan and the southeastern United States, and at least one from South America.

== Etymology and usage ==
The word is of Scandinavian via Middle English derivation (from early Scandinavian; Danish: mødding, Swedish regional: mödding).

The word "midden" is still in everyday use in Scotland and has come by extension to refer to anything that is a mess, a muddle, or chaos.

The word is used by farmers in Britain to describe the place where farmyard manure from cows or other animals is collected. Grants are sometimes available to protect these from rain to avoid runoff and pollution.

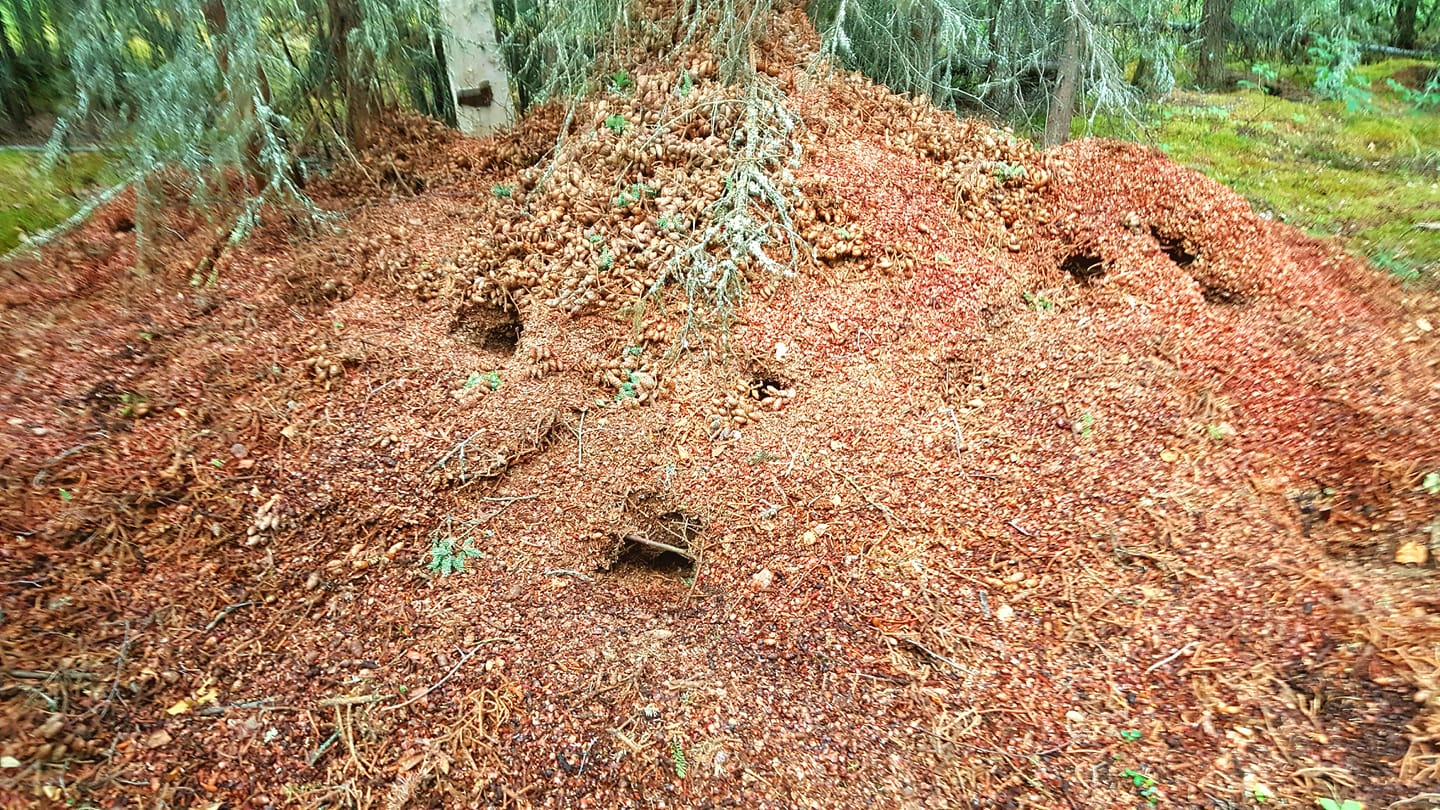
Squirrel midden, Kenai National Wildlife Refuge, Alaska

In the animal kingdom, some species establish ground burrows, also known as middens, that are used mostly for food storage. For example, the North American red squirrel (Tamiasciurus hudsonicus) usually has one large active midden in each territory with perhaps an inactive or auxiliary midden. A midden may be a regularly used animal toilet area or dunghill, created by many mammals, such as the hyrax, and also serving as a territorial marker.

Octopus middens are piles of debris that the octopus piles up to conceal the entrance of its den. Octopus middens are commonly made of rocks, shells, and the bones of prey, although they may contain anything the octopus finds that it can move.

== See also ==
- Asturian culture, characterized by shell-middens
- Crystal River Archaeological State Park
- Culch
- Emeryville Shellmound
- Green Mound
- Landfill
- Mussel Point, a megamidden in the South African West Coast
- Packrat midden
- Privy midden
- Tell
- Tumulus
- Urban archaeology
- Waste management in Australia#Pre-European settlement
- West Berkeley Shellmound
- Whaleback Shell Midden
- Yachats, Oregon
- Marpole Midden
