= Doris Marie Leeper =

American sculptor and painter

Doris "Doc" Leeper
- Born: April 4, 1929; Charlotte, North Carolina
- Died: April 11, 2000 (aged 71); New Smyrna Beach, Florida
- Education: Duke University
- Known for: Painting, Sculpture, Atlantic Center for the Arts, Canaveral National Seashore
- Awards: Florida Artists Hall of Fame (1999)

Doris "Doc" Leeper (April 4, 1929 – April 11, 2000) was an American sculptor and painter from New Smyrna Beach, Florida. She was instrumental in the creation of the Canaveral National Seashore in 1975, and the Spruce Creek Preserve, renamed the Doris Leeper Spruce Creek Preserve in memoriam. She founded the Atlantic Center for the Arts in 1982. She was inducted into the Florida Artists Hall of Fame in 1999.

Leeper was born on April 4, 1929, in Charlotte, North Carolina. She attended Duke University, originally intending to become a brain surgeon – the origin of her nickname "Doc." She eventually graduated in 1951 with a degree in art history.

In 1958, while working in the field of commercial art, she moved to the small isolated community of Eldora, Florida, situated on a barrier island between New Smyrna Beach and Titusville, Florida, along Mosquito Lagoon. As a result of her presence there, Leeper became increasingly interested in environmental preservation. By 1961, she had become a full-time artist, specializing in painting and sculpture. Her work is in over 100 collections in the U.S. and abroad.

By the early 1970s, Leeper was a well-known figure in the Florida environmental movement, as an advocate for protection of Mosquito Lagoon and opposition to major development on the barrier island around Eldora. She used her growing influence to advocate for the 1975 creation of the Canaveral National Seashore (CANA), which encompassed 58,000 acres including the barrier island and Mosquito Lagoon. Rep. Lou Frey, one of the sponsors of the Congressional authorization called Leeper "the driving force behind the establishment of Canaveral National Seashore." Afterwards she was appointed to the Canaveral National Seashore Advisory Commission and founded Friends of Canaveral where she pushed for wilderness protection for the seashore.

Leeper conceived of the Atlantic Center for the Arts in 1977, envisioning it as a Florida artist-in-residence program in which artists of all disciplines could work with current prominent artists in a supportive and creative environment. Leeper saw the potential for an artist's residency as a place for ideas to be created, shared, and come into fruition. She soon persuaded friends and community members to join in her vision. In 1979, she convinced the Rockefeller Foundation to provide a challenge grant that soon was matched. This $25,000 in seed money was the unofficial inception of the ACA. When a prime piece of property became available on the shores of Turnbull Bay, a tidal estuary west of New Smyrna Beach, Leeper raised the $50,000 necessary to buy the ten-acre plot. Three years later, five main buildings were completed. Over the years, five more buildings were constructed and an additional 59 acres were purchased as preserve land.

The ACA officially opened in 1982 for the first residency with author James Dickey, sculptor Duane Hanson, and composer David Del Tredici. Since then, over 155 interdisciplinary residencies have taken place, featuring over 430 Master Artists and over 3,500 Associate Artists from around the world.

Beginning in 1987, Leeper pushed for conservation of lands adjacent to ACA on Turnbull Bay and Spruce Creek. She founded Friends of Spruce Creek Preserve, and actively engaged in the protection of over 2,000 acres of scrub, wetlands, and archaeological sites, now known as Doris Leeper Spruce Creek Preserve.

Leeper was awarded honorary doctorates from Duke and from Stetson University. She was named Florida ambassador of the arts, and inducted into the Florida Artists Hall of Fame in 1999. A 45-year retrospective of her work was held at Cornell Fine Arts Museum in 1995.

When Canaveral National Seashore was established, the National Park Service bought out all of the private property owners in Eldora including Leeper who retained a life estate in her property. On her death on April 11, 2000, her property, as with the rest of Eldora, formally became part of the national seashore. Now, only two of its original buildings remain. In 2020, Leeper's house, known as Caper's Acres, was listed on the National Register of Historic Places, in recognition of her national reputation as an artist and environmental advocate.

== Quotes ==
If you had a world with no music, no dance, no visual arts – I don't even want to try and think about how horrible that would be.

— History of the Atlantic Center for the Arts
