= Eldora, Florida =

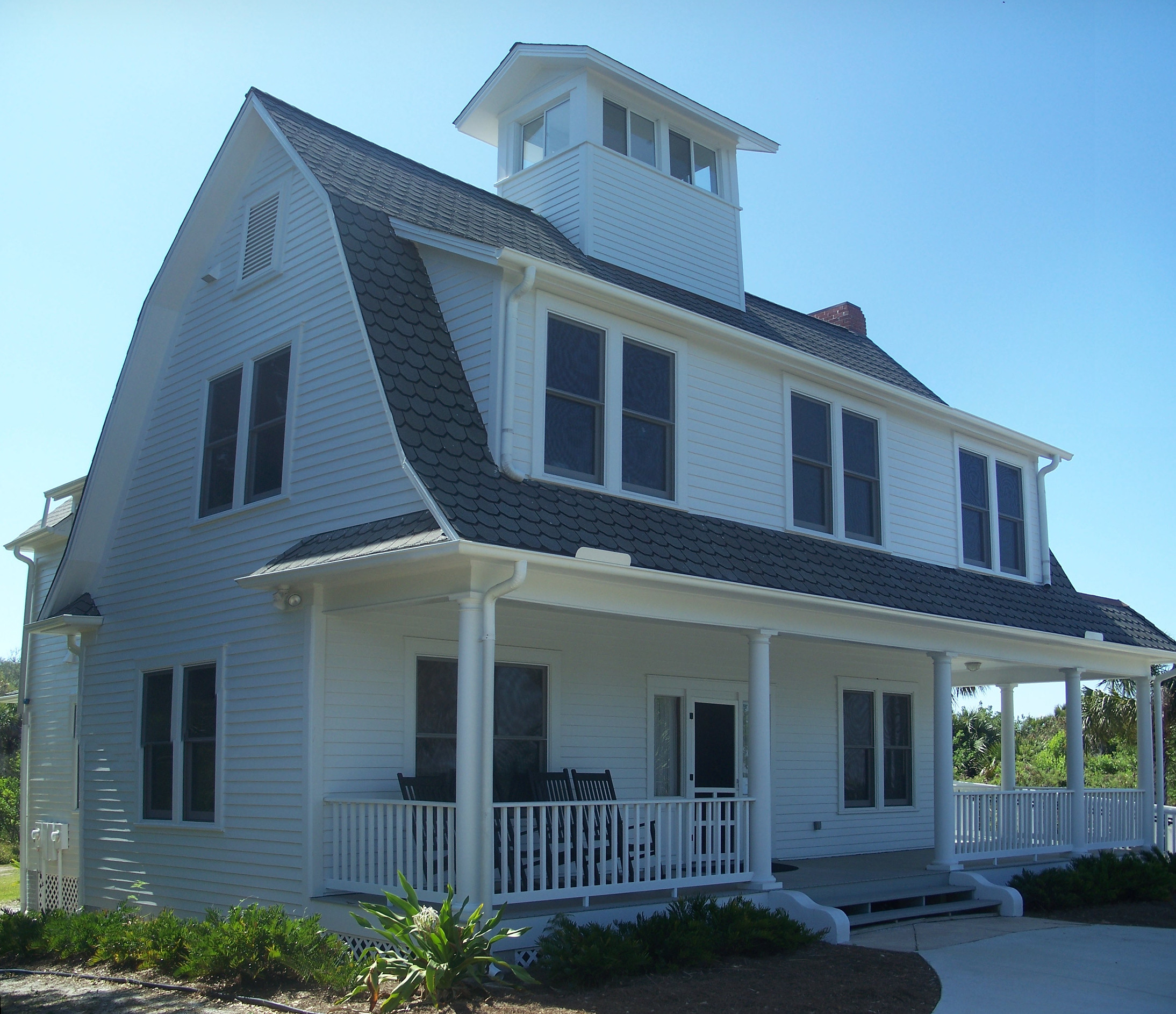
The Eldora House

Eldora is an uninhabited place in Volusia County, Florida, United States. It is located within Canaveral National Seashore, south of Bethune Beach and west of County Road A1A. The average elevation is 3 feet above sea level.

== History ==
Eldora was a community of orange groves in the latter part of the 19th century. After the Great Freeze in the winter of 1894–95 destroyed most of its crops, it was nearly completely abandoned and has never regained its population.

After the death of its last resident, Doris "Doc" Leeper in 2000, a locally famous artist and conservationist in the 1980s, the management of the town was officially turned over to the federal government, and the town is now located more than two miles within the borders of the Canaveral National Seashore. The town claims no permanent residents, and visitation is limited and subject to park hours. Only two of its original buildings remain. The largest, "The Eldora House", now holds a museum. Although the town's orange groves were nearly completely wiped out over one hundred years ago, some trees still remain.

The town is also the site of two marine research facilities jointly shared by Daytona State College and the University of Central Florida.

== Geography ==
Eldora is located at 28°54′33″N 80°49′11″W. The town's location is remote, as it is only accessible by one service road, County Road A1A. It is nearly a thirty-minute drive to the mainland through New Smyrna Beach.

== See also ==
- County Road A1A
- List of ghost towns in Florida
