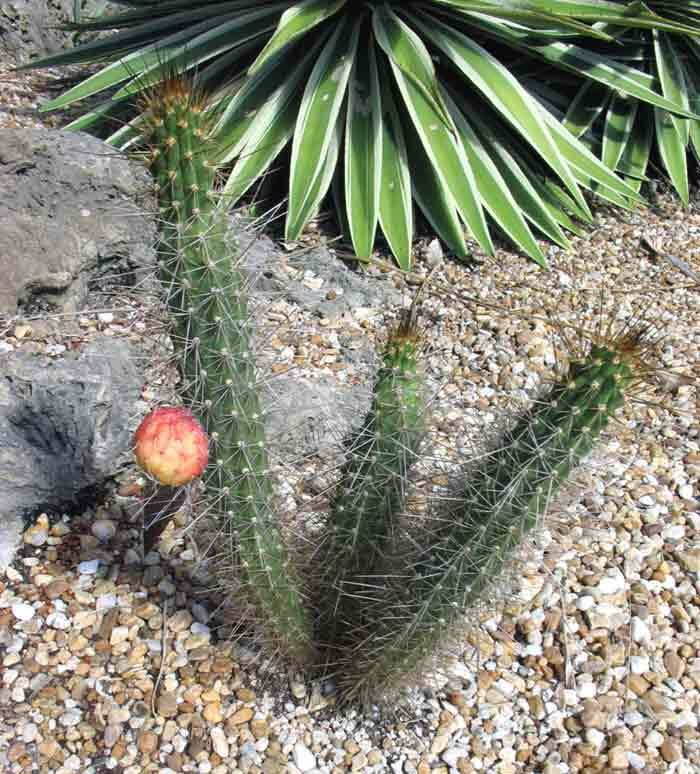

Conservation status
- Critically Imperiled (NatureServe)

Scientific classification
- Kingdom: Plantae
- Clade: Tracheophytes
- Clade: Angiosperms
- Clade: Eudicots
- Order: Caryophyllales
- Family: Cactaceae
- Subfamily: Cactoideae
- Genus: Harrisia
- Species: H. fragrans

Binomial name
- Harrisia fragrans Small ex Britton & Rose

Synonyms
- Cereus eriophorus var. fragrans (Small ex Britton & Rose) L.D.Benson 1969; Cereus fragrans (Small ex Britton & Rose) Little 1945; Harrisia eriophora var. fragrans (Small ex Britton & Rose) D.B.Ward 2004; Cereus gracilis var. simpsonii (Small ex Britton & Rose) L.D.Benson 1969; Harrisia gracilis var. simpsonii (Small ex Britton & Rose) D.B.Ward 2004; Harrisia simpsonii Small ex Britton & Rose 1920

= Harrisia fragrans =

Species of cactus

Harrisia fragrans is a rare species of cactus known by the common name fragrant prickly apple. It is endemic to Florida, where it is known only from St. Lucie County. The plant's habitat has been almost completely consumed by development, leading to its rarity. It is a federally listed endangered species of the United States.

== Description ==
This is an erect or spreading cactus with narrow, long stems which can well exceed one meter in length, at times approaching five meters. It is covered in long, yellow or yellow-tipped spines which may be up to 4 centimeters long. It produces enormous tubular flowers up to 20 centimeters long which are sweet-scented and white to pinkish in color. They bloom at night. The fruit is spherical and red or orange in color, measuring up to 6 centimeters wide. The fruits are a favorite food of local birds, which likely help to disperse the seeds. The cactus has been noted to live at least 19 years, and in general has low fecundity; older, larger plants are more likely to survive, and they have higher fecundity, as well. Small plants may benefit from growing with nurse plants.

== Habitat ==
The plant's favored natural habitat is mostly coastal hammocks with some shade, as the cactus can become desiccated in full sun at elevations of 0-10 meters. Coastal hammocks of this kind have become uncommon as they have been cleared for development and heavily fragmented.

There are ten confirmed occurrences of the plant, nine of which occur around Savannahs Preserve State Park in St. Lucie County and totalled 2150 individuals in the year 2002. The tenth confirmed occurrence is at the Canaveral National Seashore in Volusia County, and it contains about 96 plants. An occurrence has been reported in Indian River County, but it has not been confirmed. The cactus once grew in at least two places in Brevard County, but these populations have been extirpated.

== Threats ==
Remaining populations of the cactus can now be found in sandy scrub habitat. The remaining habitat is degraded with the overgrowth of invasive plant species such as love vine (Cassytha filiformis). While the cactus does not like full sun, it also cannot tolerate being shaded out by brush. Other threats to the plant have been all-terrain vehicles, herbicides, feral pigs, and hurricane damage from wind and falling branches. Populations have been vandalized with machetes. Cacti have died from being buried in sand, and have been stolen by cactus enthusiasts and collectors. A scale insect (Diaspis echinocacti), sometimes eats the stems of the cactus, and some sort of caterpillar has been noted to inflict some damage. Woodpeckers have been observed poking holes in the stems, which injures the plants. Most of the remaining populations are within the bounds of a state park, so their habitat is safe from development.

== Taxonomy ==
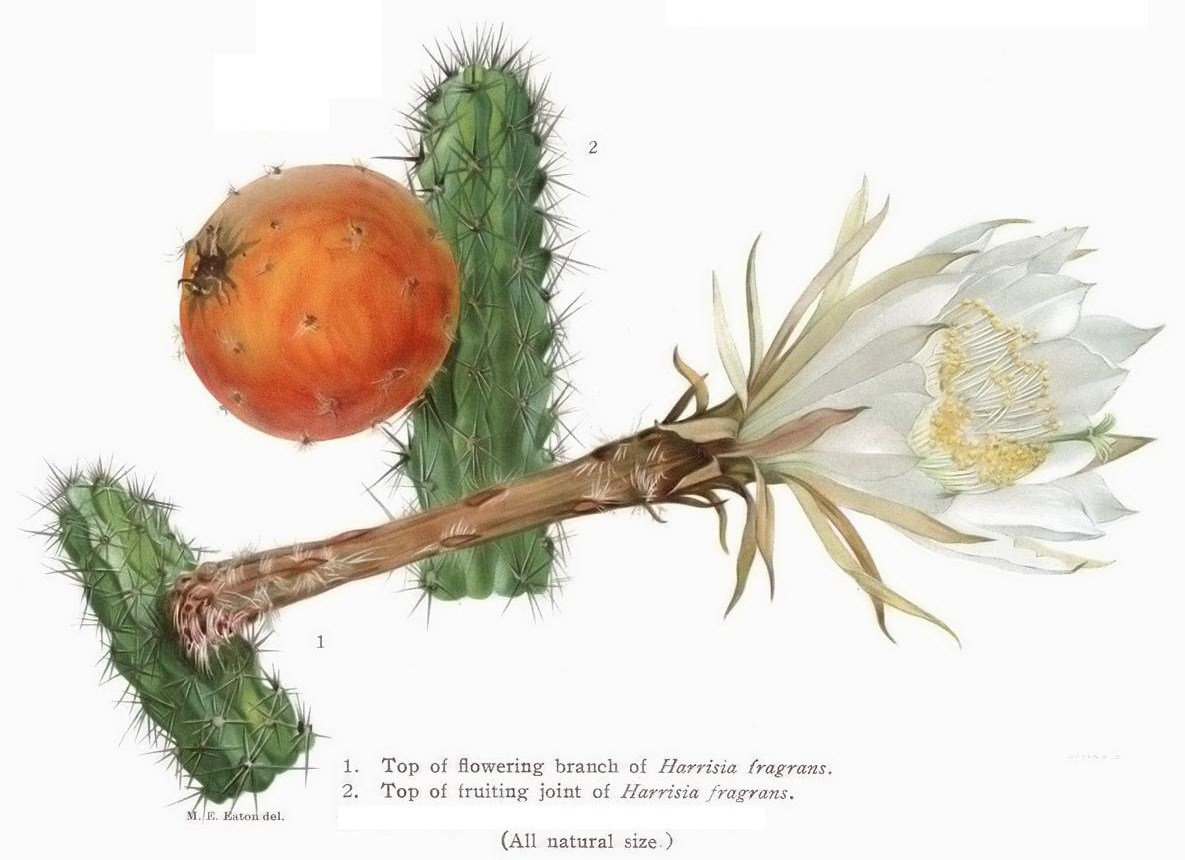
Harrisia fragrans from The Cactaceae Vol II

The first description was made in 1920 by John Kunkel Small in Nathaniel Lord Britton and Joseph Nelson Rose's work The Cactaceae. Nomenclature synonyms are Cereus fragrans (Small) Little (1945), Cereus eriophorus var. fragrans (Small) L.D.Benson (1969) and Harrisia eriophora var. fragrans (Small) D.B.Ward (2004).
