= Moulton–Wells House =

Historic house in Florida, United States

- U.S. National Register of Historic Places
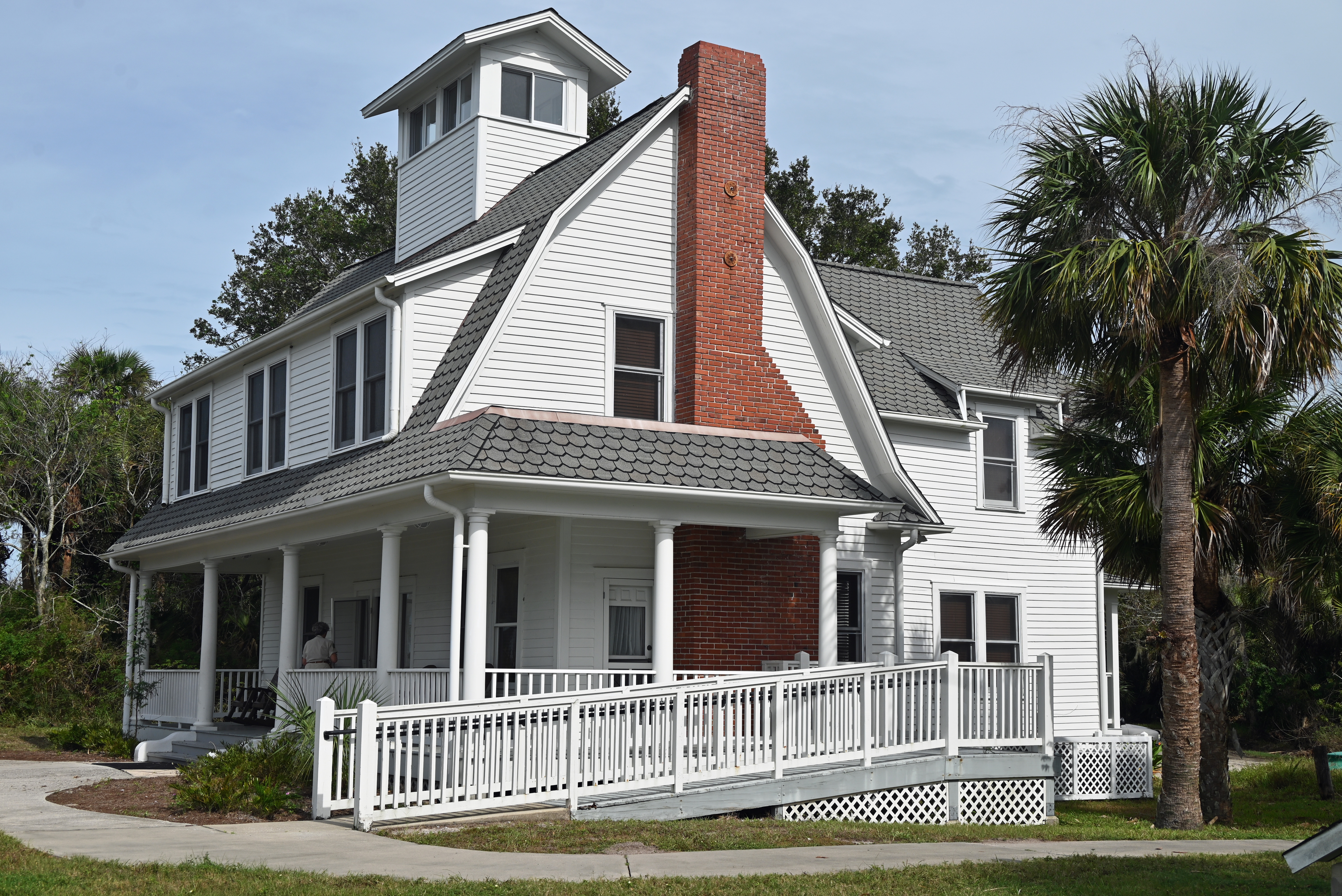

- Location within Volusia County
- Location: Eldora, Florida
- Coordinates: 28°54′32″N 80°49′16″W
- Area: 1.0 acre (0.40 ha)
- Built: c. 1913
- Architectural style: Colonial Revival
- NRHP reference No.: 01001247
- Added to NRHP: November 21, 2001

The Moulton–Wells House (also known as the Eldora State House and Eldora Village) is a historic house in Eldora, Florida. It is located west of Eldora Road, and is part of the Canaveral National Seashore. On November 21, 2001, it was added to the U.S. National Register of Historic Places.
