= Bethune Beach, Florida =

Unincorporated community in Florida, U.S.

Coordinates: 28°56′57″N 80°50′16″W

Bethune Beach is an unincorporated community in Volusia County, Florida, United States. It is an urban residential single-family zoned community known for its peace, quiet and quaintness. It was once the only beach African Americans were permitted to use in the county and is named for Mary McLeod Bethune who helped organize a wade-in in support of desegregation.

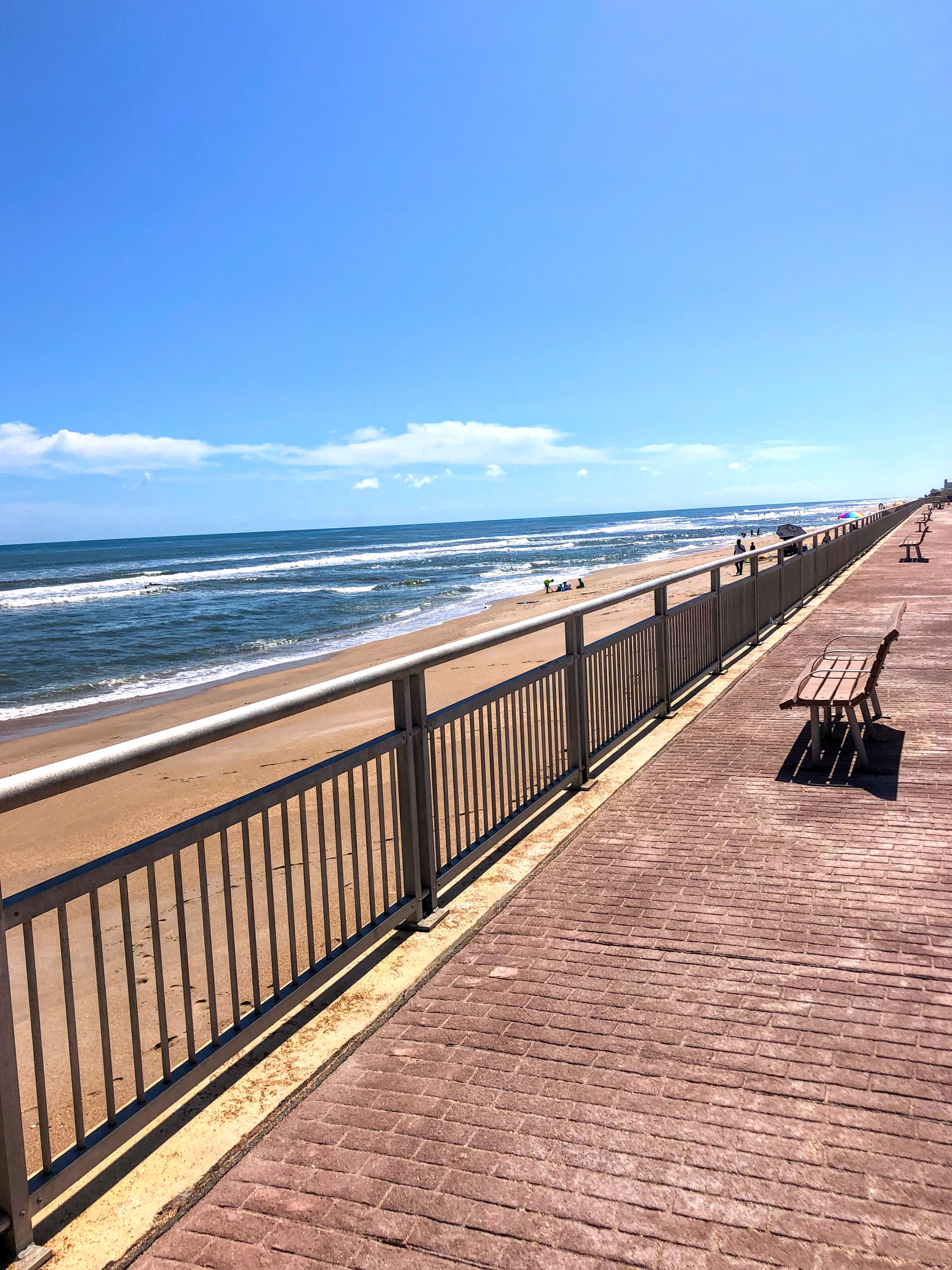

Bethune Beach is located south of New Smyrna Beach (with Silver Sands between), and its southern border is the northern end of the Canaveral National Seashore. Due to its remote location, Bethune Beach is accessible by only one road, County Road A1A, entry being permitted only from the north. There is no outlet to the mainland, and the Canaveral National Seashore and the Kennedy Space Center lie to the south.

== History ==
The area had the only beach that African Americans were permitted to use in Volusia County during the first half of the twentieth century and is named after educator Dr. Mary McLeod Bethune, founder of Bethune-Cookman College.

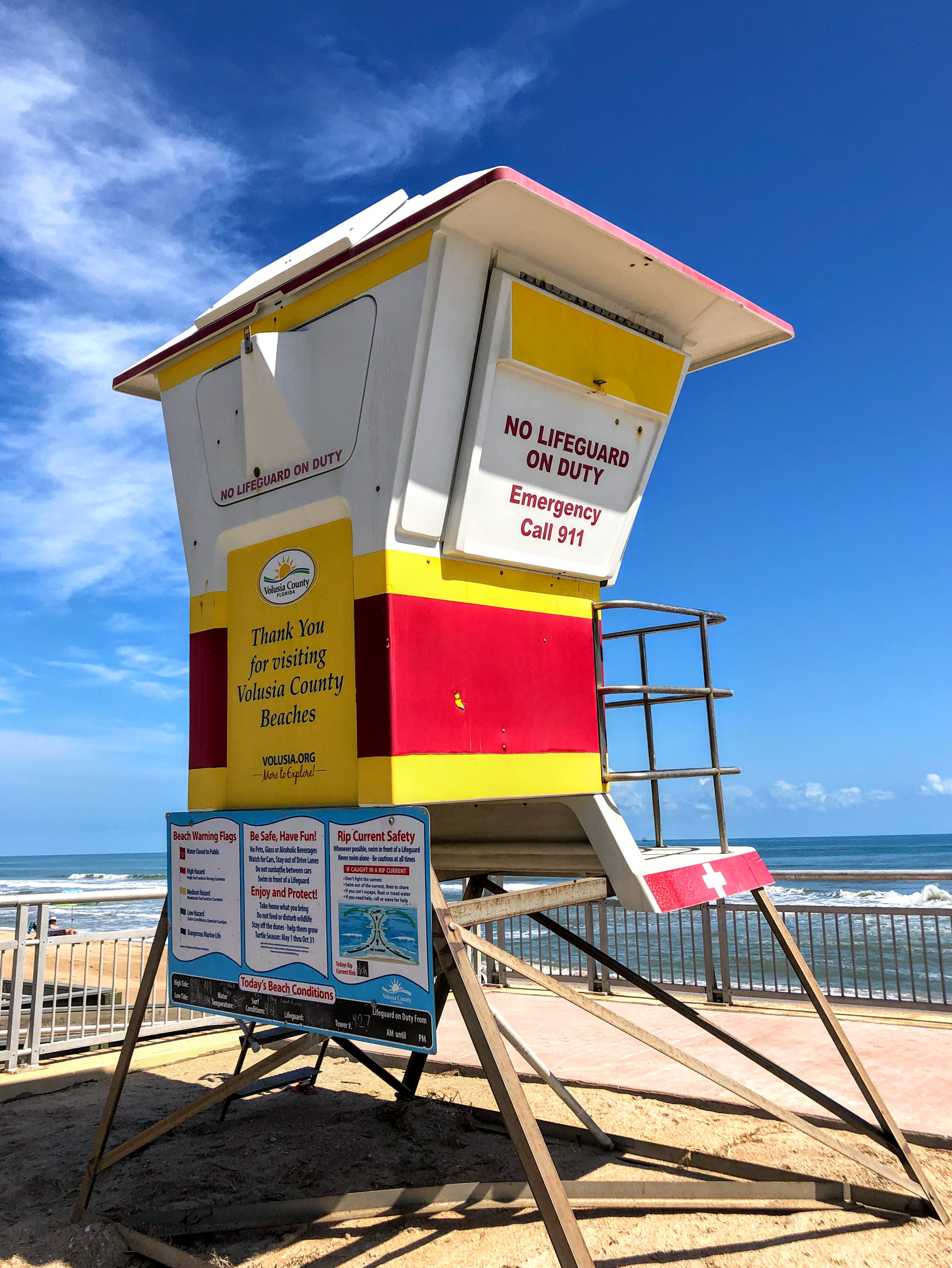

In 2007, Bethune Beach residents overwhelmingly voted to reject an annexation attempt by New Smyrna Beach. This area is known for its no-drive beach and proximity to Atlantic Ocean and Indian River on either side.
