= List of national lakeshores and seashores of the United States =

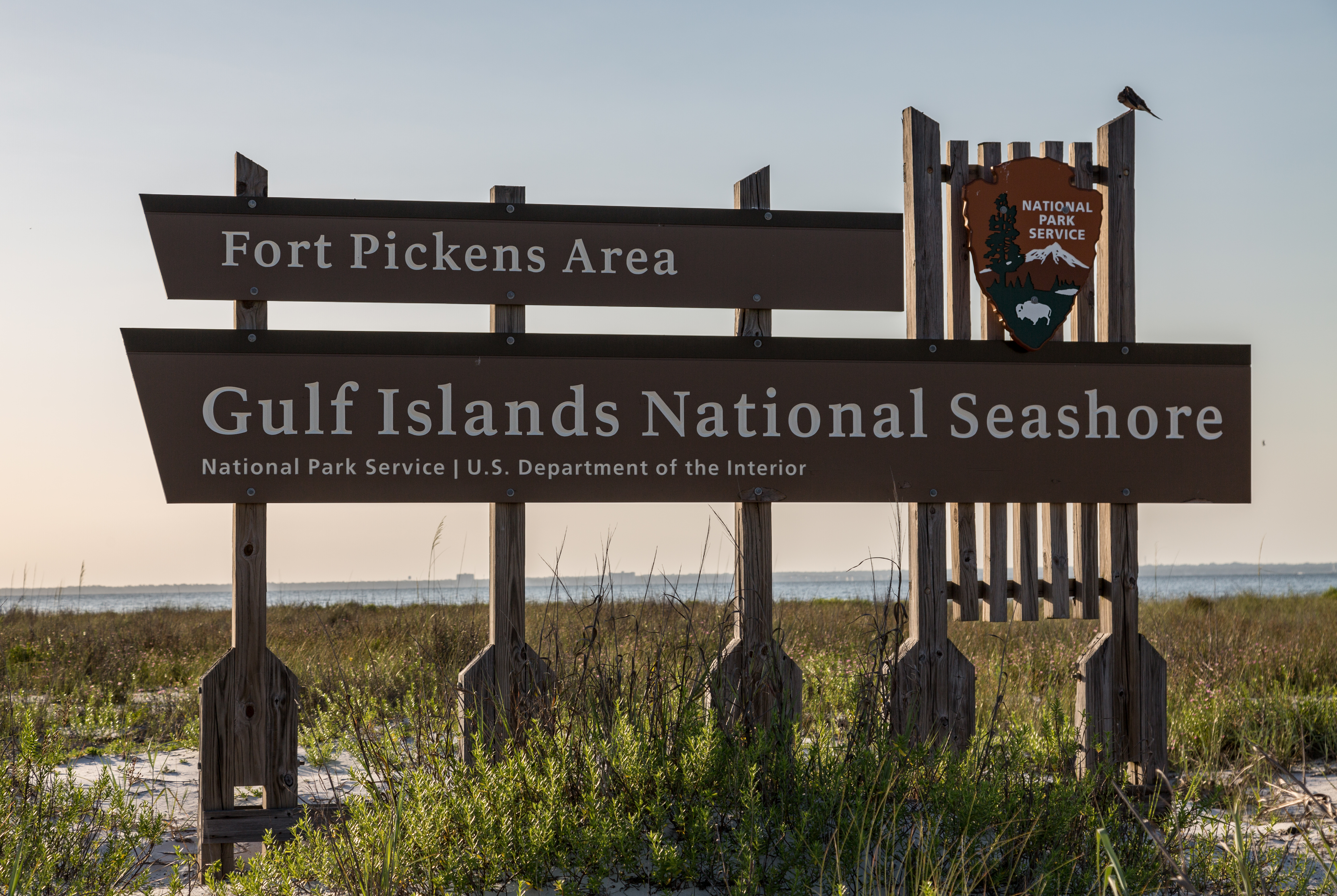
Welcome sign on the beach at Gulf Islands National Seashore, Florida

The United States has ten protected areas known as national seashores and three known as national lakeshores, which are public lands operated by the National Park Service (NPS), an agency of the Department of the Interior. National seashores and lakeshores are coastal areas federally designated by Congress as being of natural and recreational significance as a preserved area. All of the national lakeshores are on Lakes Michigan and Superior, and nine of the ten national seashores are on the Atlantic Ocean, including two on the Gulf of Mexico. Point Reyes is the only national seashore on the Pacific coast. While all of these protected sites have extensive beaches for recreation, they extend inland to include other natural resources like wetlands and marshes, forests, lakes and lagoons, and dunes. Many also feature historic lighthouses and estates.

National seashores are located in ten states and national lakeshores are in two other states. Florida, North Carolina, and Michigan each have two. The largest national seashore or lakeshore is Gulf Islands, at over 137,000 acres (550 km^{2}); the smallest is Fire Island, at 19,579 acres (79.23 km^{2}). The total areas protected by national seashores and lakeshores are approximately 595,000 acres (2,410 km^{2}) and 214,000 acres (870 km^{2}), respectively. These thirteen sites had a total visitation of 21.1 million people in 2017, led by Cape Cod at over 4 million visitors. The lakeshores and seashores have an emphasis on recreation, and most allow hunting and off-road vehicles, which is not permitted in national parks. Five seashores and lakeshores also include land more strictly protected as wilderness areas.

Shorelines, both on oceans and lakes, are particularly vulnerable to natural change. National seashores have experienced higher temperatures than in the past, with even hotter summers expected from the effects of climate change. All nine seashores on the Atlantic and Gulf of Mexico feature low-lying barrier islands, which could be submerged by rising sea levels, and storm surges from severe hurricanes can disintegrate the beaches. Warmer temperatures at the Great Lakes may result in continued drop in water levels, with unclear effects on the shoreline. The Natural Resources Defense Council states that long-term planning for all sites must address erosion and visitor access.

== History ==
The first federal protection of shoreline in the U.S. for public recreation purposes was in 1930, when Congress established "the principle of conserving the natural beauty of shore lines for recreational use" in northern Minnesota. With a push for job-creating conservation programs during the Great Depression, the National Park Service expanded its role in managing national parks and national monuments to protecting historic sites and recreation areas, including coastlines. Its work controlling erosion at North Carolina's Outer Banks led to it considering designation of Cape Hatteras, where not only beach-going but also fishing and hunting were already popular, as a national beach or national recreation area, but debate over the meaning of this status and how the land would be acquired by the NPS delayed action, as existing and expected development made it unsuitable for a national park. The 1936 Park, Parkway, and Recreational Area Study Act gave the Park Service a framework to designate and protect a wider variety of resources that included recreational land use. Congress authorized Cape Hatteras National Seashore in August 1937, and President Roosevelt signed the bill before visiting Roanoke Island. It was not established, however, until 1953 and dedicated in 1958 after permission to hunt was determined, the land was purchased and donated to the Park Service, and ongoing funding was authorized, but the process would serve as an example for how to create and manage similar dual-purpose sites.

A 1955 NPS survey of the Atlantic and Gulf coasts recommended sixteen areas that would be worthy of protection, five of which would become national seashores. Studies of the Great Lakes and Pacific coast also led to designations, including Pictured Rocks, authorized as the first national lakeshore in 1966. Funds from the Bureau of Outdoor Recreation and the Mission 66 program drove system expansion and land acquisition by the Park Service. Altogether thirteen further national seashores and lakeshores would be authorized and established, all in the 1960s and 1970s. The 1961 law authorizing Cape Cod National Seashore was the first to include appropriations for purchasing land; to prevent local opposition it limited removal of private property and established an advisory commission with local representation, an innovation used for others. The creation of Cape Cod recognized the importance of commitment to preserving entire areas threatened by development, even as philosophical questions of uniqueness, national importance, and protection of an urbanized area were raised. The national lakeshores, seashores, and riverways, although lacking recognizable monuments, would be rare coastal areas kept in more pristine condition. Their geologic features and biological significance of diverse plant life was also important for gaining federal protection.

The newest national lakeshore or seashore is Canaveral, established in 1975. There is one former national lakeshore, renamed Indiana Dunes National Park in 2019 in a bid to increase visibility and tourism to the area despite the Park Service's naming conventions. Other national parks that include coastal areas, such as Olympic and Acadia National Parks, emphasize conservation over recreation, though the enabling legislation for seashores and lakeshores vary in the degree to which the two are stressed.

== National seashores ==
Name	Image	Location	Date established	Area	Description
Assateague Island	Wild horses standing in marshes	Atlantic coast: Maryland, Virginia; 38.08°N 75.21°W	September 21, 1965	39,726.75 acres (160.8 km^{2})	As a barrier island, Assateague Island's beach and dunes are continually shaped by wind and waves. It is known for its feral horses and is also home to deer, crabs, fox, and migrating snow geese. Main vegetation includes American beach grass, saltmarsh cordgrass and sea rocket.
Canaveral	Irregular shaped swampy islands	Atlantic coast: Florida; 28.77°N 80.78°W	January 3, 1975	57,661.69 acres (233.3 km^{2})	Adjacent to the Kennedy Space Center, this barrier island has a variety of recreational activities including hiking, boating, and fishing. The Seminole Rest features an ancient Native American mound, and Eldora Statehouse shows historic life on the lagoon. Florida's longest undeveloped Atlantic beach surrounds Mosquito Lagoon, which is home to dolphins, manatees, and sea turtles, along with a variety of sea grasses.
Cape Cod	Red and white lighthouse next to a house	Atlantic coast: Massachusetts; 41.95°N 70.00°W	June 1, 1966	43,608.48 acres (176.5 km^{2})	Beyond its nearly 40 miles of beaches, this historic area has Marconi Station, the Three Sisters Lighthouses, and the former North Truro Air Force Station. Cranberry bogs, marshes, and hiking trails provide a look into the flora and fauna of Cape Cod.
Cape Hatteras	Black and white lighthouse on a beach	Atlantic coast: North Carolina; 35.30°N 75.51°W	January 12, 1953	30,350.65 acres (122.8 km^{2})	Located in the Outer Banks, Cape Hatteras is known for its Bodie Island and Cape Hatteras Lighthouses. Popular recreation activities include windsurfing, birdwatching, fishing, shell collecting, and kayaking. Constantly changing from ocean activity, this barrier island provides refuge for the endangered piping plover, seabeach amaranth, and sea turtles.
Cape Lookout	Walkway over dunes leading to a lighthouse	Atlantic coast: North Carolina; 34.61°N 76.54°W	March 10, 1966	28,243.36 acres (114.3 km^{2})	Cape Lookout National Seashore is made up of three islands of the Outer Banks, accessible only by boat. It is known for its wild horses and the Cape Lookout Lighthouse. Hiking, camping, fishing, and birdwatching are popular recreational activities. It is also home to two historic villages.
Cumberland Island	Narrow barrier island with trees, shrubs, sand, and ocean	Atlantic coast: Georgia; 30.83°N 81.45°W	October 23, 1972	36,415.13 acres (147.4 km^{2})	Accessible only by boat, Cumberland Island is the site of the Plum Orchard estate, Thomas Carnegie's ruined Dungeness mansion, and an African Baptist church near sandy beaches and marshes. The museum on the mainland exhibits Timucua Indian history, Nathaniel Green and Eli Whitney's works, and War of 1812 battles.
Fire Island	Wooden walkway between trees	Atlantic coast: New York; 40.70°N 72.98°W	September 11, 1964	19,579.47 acres (79.2 km^{2})	Fire Island, a barrier island south of Long Island, has the historic William Floyd House and Fire Island Lighthouse. The beaches and dunes are complemented by a sunken forest, wetlands, and seventeen communities.
Gulf Islands	Semicircular red fort on the beach	Gulf coast: Florida, Mississippi; 30.36°N 86.97°W	January 8, 1971	137,990.97 acres (558.4 km^{2})	Seven main islands have four historic forts built by the Spanish and Americans that were used for defense in the War of 1812 and Civil War. Apache Indians once lived here, including Geronimo. There are nature trails for wildlife viewing and long beaches for snorkeling, biking, and other activities.
Padre Island	Dunes at the beach	Gulf coast: Texas; 27°N 97.38°W	April 6, 1968	130,434.27 acres (527.8 km^{2})	Padre Island, the world's longest undeveloped barrier island, is a nesting ground for the Kemp's ridley sea turtle and a migratory site for least terns, brown pelicans, and piping plovers. Malaquite Beach provides a variety of recreational activities, and Novillo Line Camp has the remains of a cattle ranch. The military used part of the island as a bombing range during WWII.
Point Reyes	Steep cliffs by a rocky ocean and beach	Pacific coast: California; 38.00°N 123.00°W	October 20, 1972	71,067.78 acres (287.6 km^{2})	Historic locations on Point Reyes Peninsula include the Point Reyes Lighthouse and Lifeboat Station and a recreated Coast Miwok village. Gray whales can be seen as they migrate near the seashore, and tule elk and elephant seals populate the wilderness area of cliffs and ridges. Also part of a UNESCO Biosphere Reserve (Golden Gate Biosphere Reserve).

== National lakeshores ==
Name	Image	Location	Date established	Area	Description
Apostle Islands	Waves crashing into a rocky shore	Wisconsin; 46.97°N 90.66°W	September 26, 1970	69,371.89 acres (280.7 km^{2})	Twenty-one islands and shoreline on the northern tip of Wisconsin on Lake Superior offer a variety of recreation opportunities, including scuba diving at four shipwrecks. It is known for its sandstone sea caves, a few old growth remnant forests, natural animal habitats, and eight lighthouses, the most at any NPS site. Eighty percent of the land area is protected as the Gaylord Nelson Wilderness.
Pictured Rocks	Rounded rock tower jutting into the lake	Michigan; 46.56°N 86.31°W	October 15, 1966	73,235.83 acres (296.4 km^{2})	The Pictured Rocks are colorful sandstone cliffs jutting in Lake Superior from the Upper Peninsula. Sea caves around them become climbable ice caves in the winter and waterfalls also freeze into curtained formations. The five-mile-long Great Sable Dunes stand over 300 ft (91 m) high near the 1874 Au Sable Light. A portion is protected as the Beaver Basin Wilderness.
Sleeping Bear Dunes	People on sandy dunes overlooking farmland and the lake	Michigan; 44.91°N 86.02°W	October 21, 1970	71,198.48 acres (288.1 km^{2})	Sand dunes reaching 450 ft (140 m) above Lake Michigan on 4 sq mi (10 km^{2}) of glacial moraines are the centerpiece of one of the state's most popular areas for hiking, camping, and canoeing. Two wilderness islands, marshy wetlands, and maple forests are home to more than 1500 plant and animal species living near historic farmsteads.

== See also ==
- List of areas in the United States National Park System
- List of national monuments of the United States
- List of national parks of the United States
- History of the National Park Service
- National Wilderness Preservation System
