= Sir Francis Drake Association =

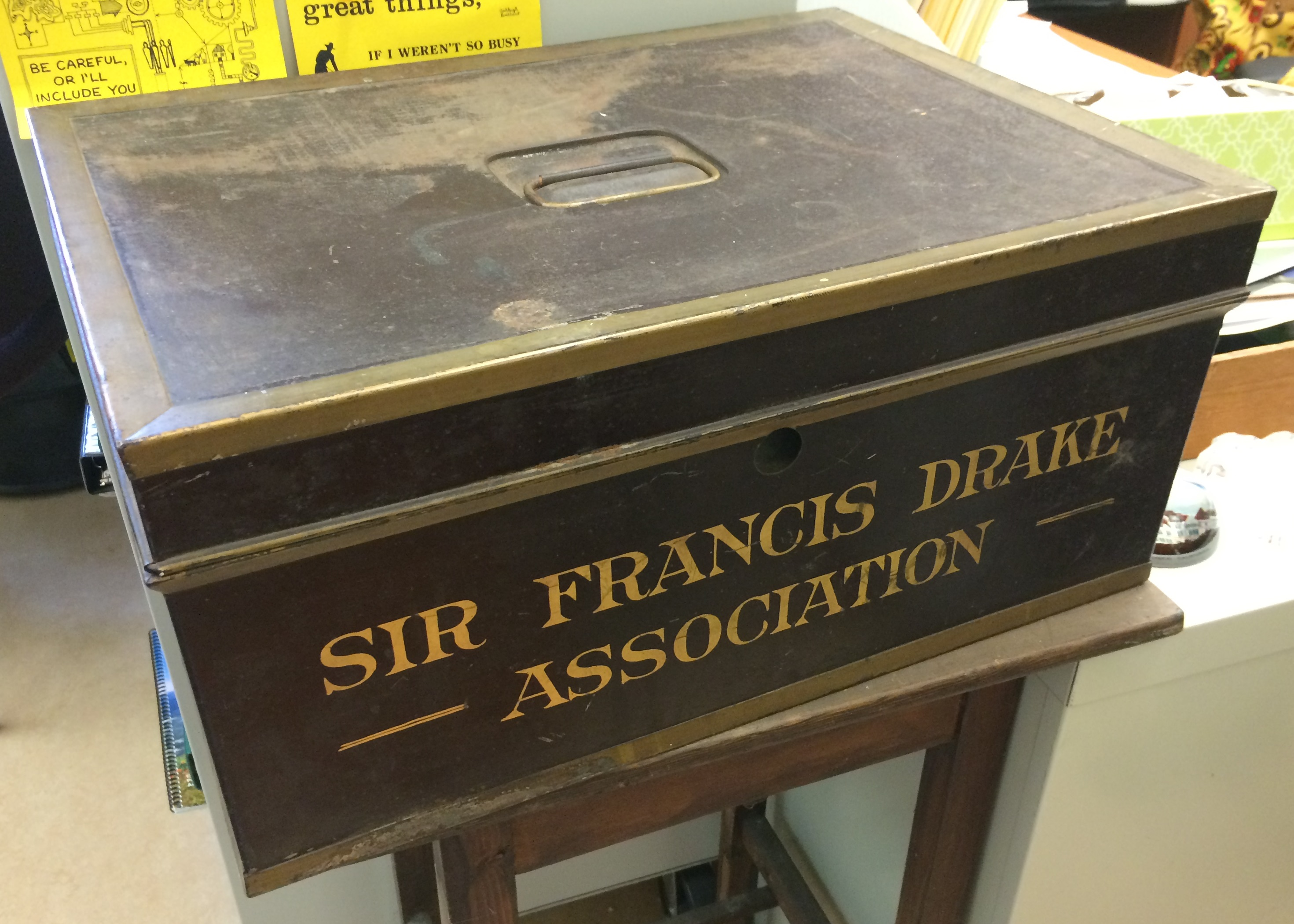
Metal box containing records of the Sir Francis Drake Association, Marin County, California.

The Sir Francis Drake Association was a group of San Francisco Bay Area residents and others who promoted the historical Francis Drake's landing at New Albion in Marin County, California in 1579. The Association held a number of gatherings, picnics and pageants between 1912 and 1957.

== History ==
At its early gathering in 1916, about 30 people attended and a large post with a plaque dedicated to Drake's visit was put up.

In early gatherings, participants took the train or stage to Point Reyes Station and locals provided conveyances to the site.

By 1926, participants were arriving by auto with instructions on opening the various gates provided. Part of the route was described as a "ranch road, but much better than highway detours."

The early gatherings were near the site of the Point Reyes Lifeboat Station.

In 1930, the Association had plans for a large redwood-tree church to be built to honor Drake's landing and the first church service.

In 1946, the Association had a stone cross erected at Drake's Beach to honor the first use of the English language in the New World and the first services of the Church of England in what has become the United States

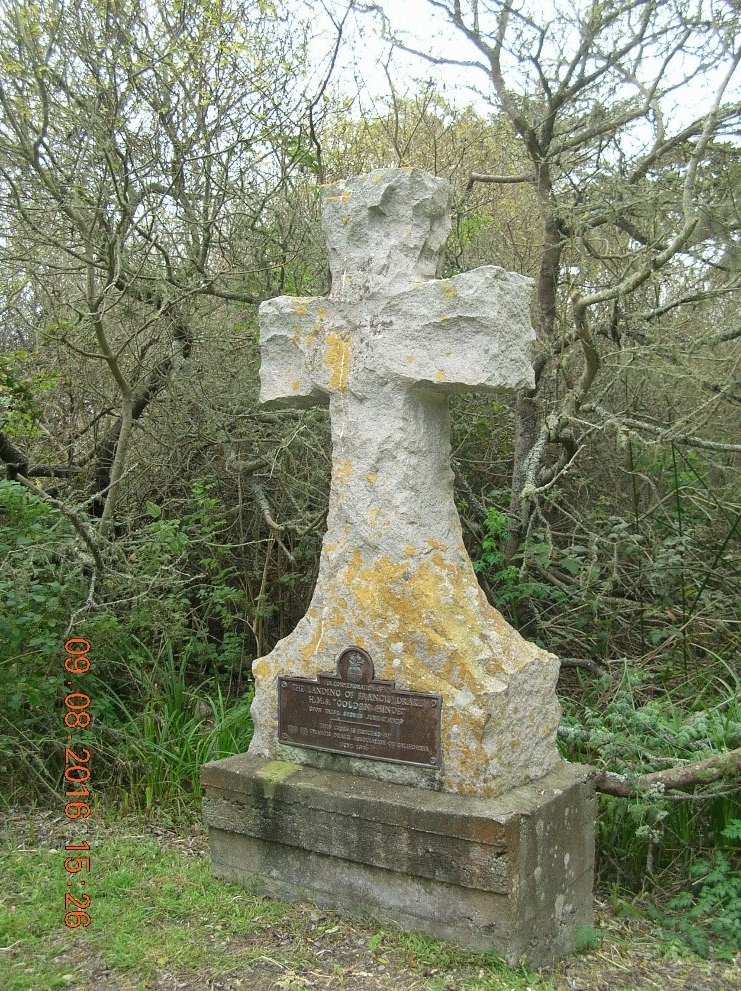
This Celtic cross was installed by the Sir Francis Drake Association to honor Drake's visit and the first service of the Church of England in the future USA.
