= Camp Hydle =

Former United States Navy Base

Camp Hydle, Point Reyes Gunnery Range and Drakes Bay Range
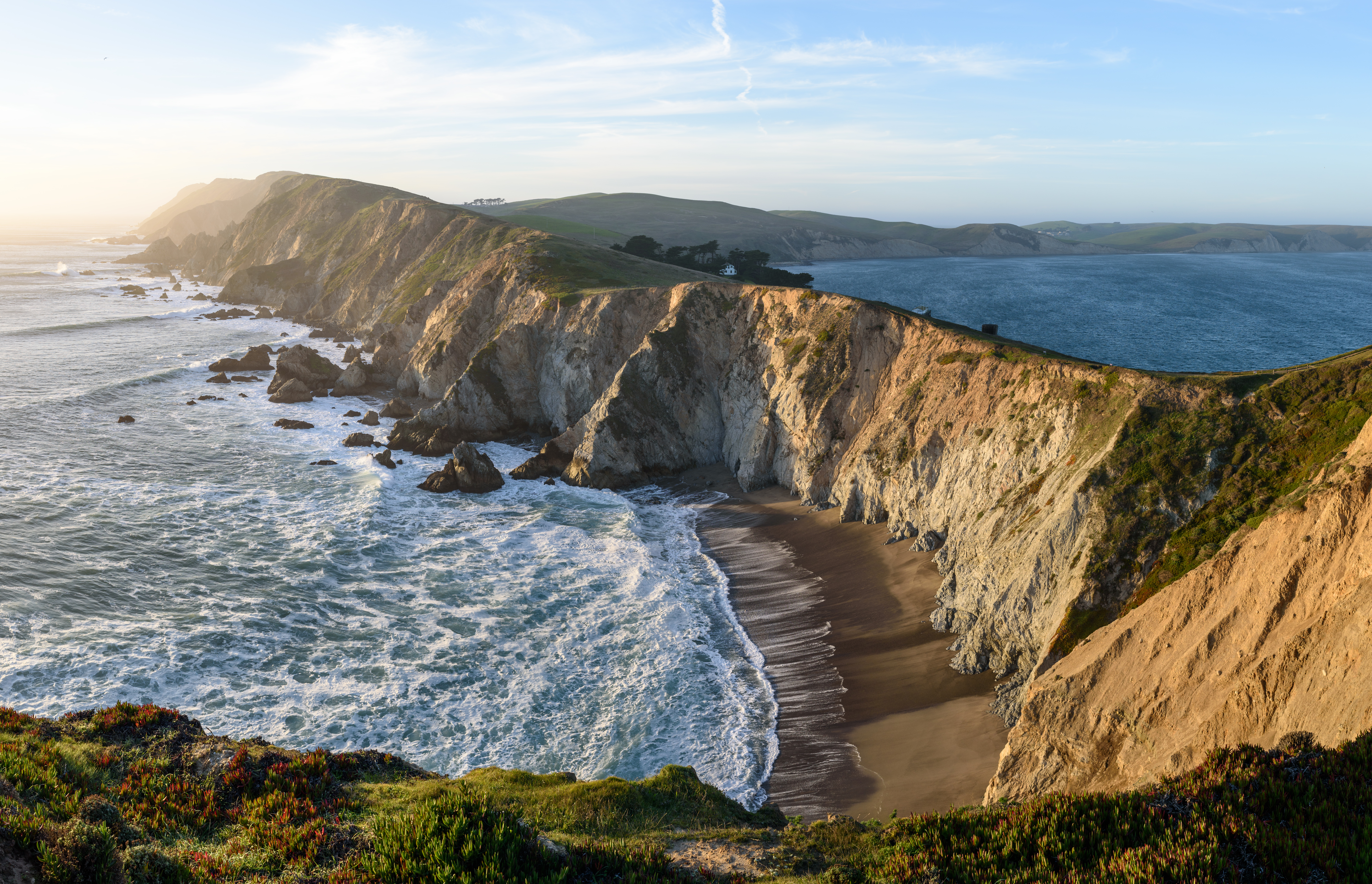
- Headlands of the Point Reyes Peninsula from Chimney Rock, looking north.

- Location within California Location within the United States
- Location: Marin County, California, United States
- Nearest city: Point Reyes Station, California
- Coordinates: 38°2′N 122°53′W

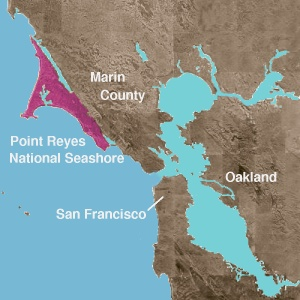
Drakes Bay Range, now the Point Reyes National Seashore

Camp Hydle, also called Drakes Bay Range, was a large training center during World War II, located at Drakes Bay, on what is now Point Reyes National Seashore on the coast of northern California in the United States. The camp had several training sites: Camp Hydle, Drakes Bay Air to Ground Gunnery Range, Drakes Bay Dive Bombing Target, Camp Murphy's Ranch, Camp Hydle Maneuver Area, and Camp Hydle Skip and Dive Bombing Range. Also at the camp were landing craft training and air sea rescue training. The site was 10,532 acres (4,262 ha) of Marin County, California land on the West Coast of the United States. The complete area from Stinson Beach to the south and Dillon Beach to the north was called the Point Reyes Gunnery Range at Point Reyes. The Gunnery Range also included: two radar towers, horse stable, two lifeboat Stations, the Point Reyes Lighthouse, lookout towers, and land strafing targets (rake). The dive bomber airplanes came from Hamilton Army Airfield (AAF), Santa Rosa Army Airfield (AAF), and Naval Air Station Alameda (NAS). In addition to Drakes Bay the planes also training using the nearby Abbotts Lagoon, and Tomales Bay. The landing craft training used Limantour Beach and Limantour Spit. Anti-aircraft gun training was important training for the Pacific War. Camp Hydle base was inland 1/2 mi (0.80 km) east of Limantour Beach. For gunner training planes towed targets across Drakes Bay. Ships also trained at the base, like the USS Walton and USS Nevada (BB-36). The Navy's Camp Hydle took over the Point Reyes Lifeboat Station during the war. The 50 men at the Station were air sea rescue pilots, dropping rafts to plane crew that landed in the ocean during training. The first troops arrived at the site on December 7, 1941. The site was also used as a coast defense spot, looking out for Japanese subs and ships. Most of the land was leased from Leland Murphy (Murphy Ranch), after the war in 1962, the site became Point Reyes National Seashore.

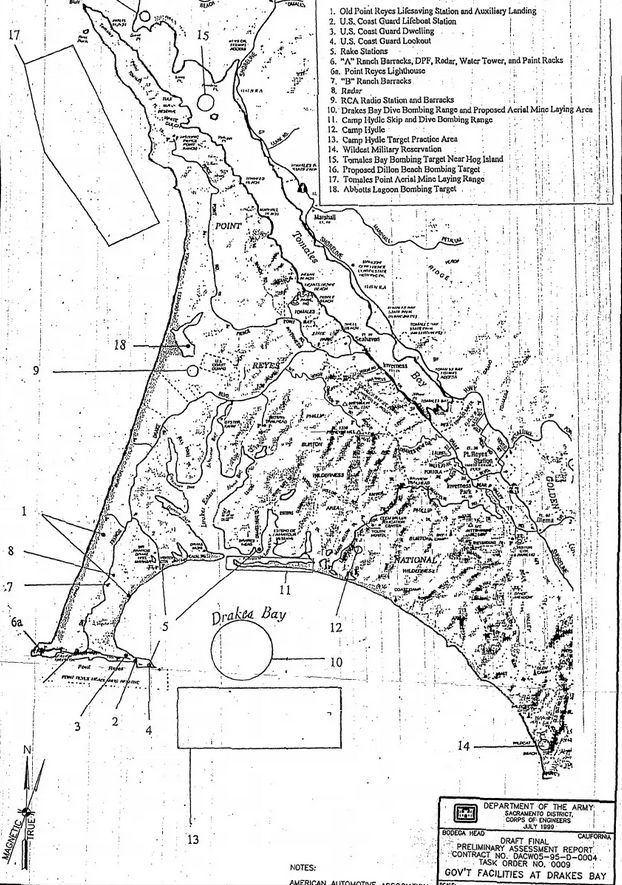
Map of Camp Hydle and the Drakes Bay Range

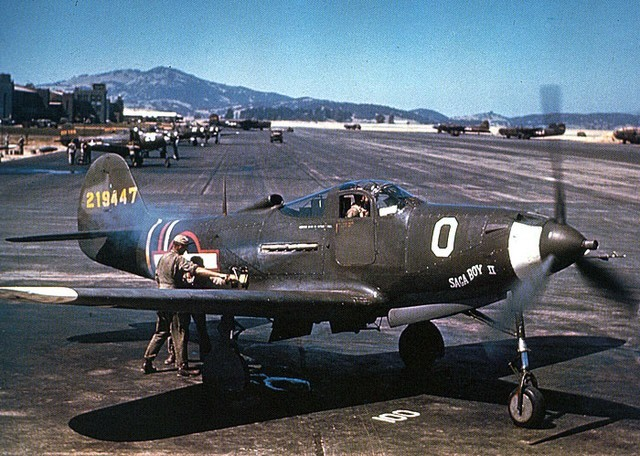
Bell P-39 Airacobra 42–19447 at Hamilton Field, 1943, one that would have trained at Drakes Bay Range

== See also ==
- California during World War II
- List of beaches in California
- List of California state parks
