= Point Reyes Light =

Point Reyes Light can refer to:

- Point Reyes Lighthouse, also known as the Point Reyes Light
- The Point Reyes Light (newspaper), a newspaper
