= Ross Hammock Site =

- U.S. National Register of Historic Places
- Location within Volusia County
- Location: Volusia County, Florida
- Nearest city: New Smyrna Beach
- Coordinates: 29.02°N 80.92°W
- Area: 1,000 acres (4.0 km^{2})
- NRHP reference No.: 81000083
- Added to NRHP: February 5, 1981

The Ross Hammock Site is a historic site nine miles south of New Smyrna Beach, Florida. It is located inland from the Intracoastal Waterway on A1A within the Canaveral National Seashore. On February 5, 1981, it was added to the U.S. National Register of Historic Places.
