= Canaveral National Seashore =

National Seashore in Florida, U.S.

- IUCN category V (protected landscape/seascape)
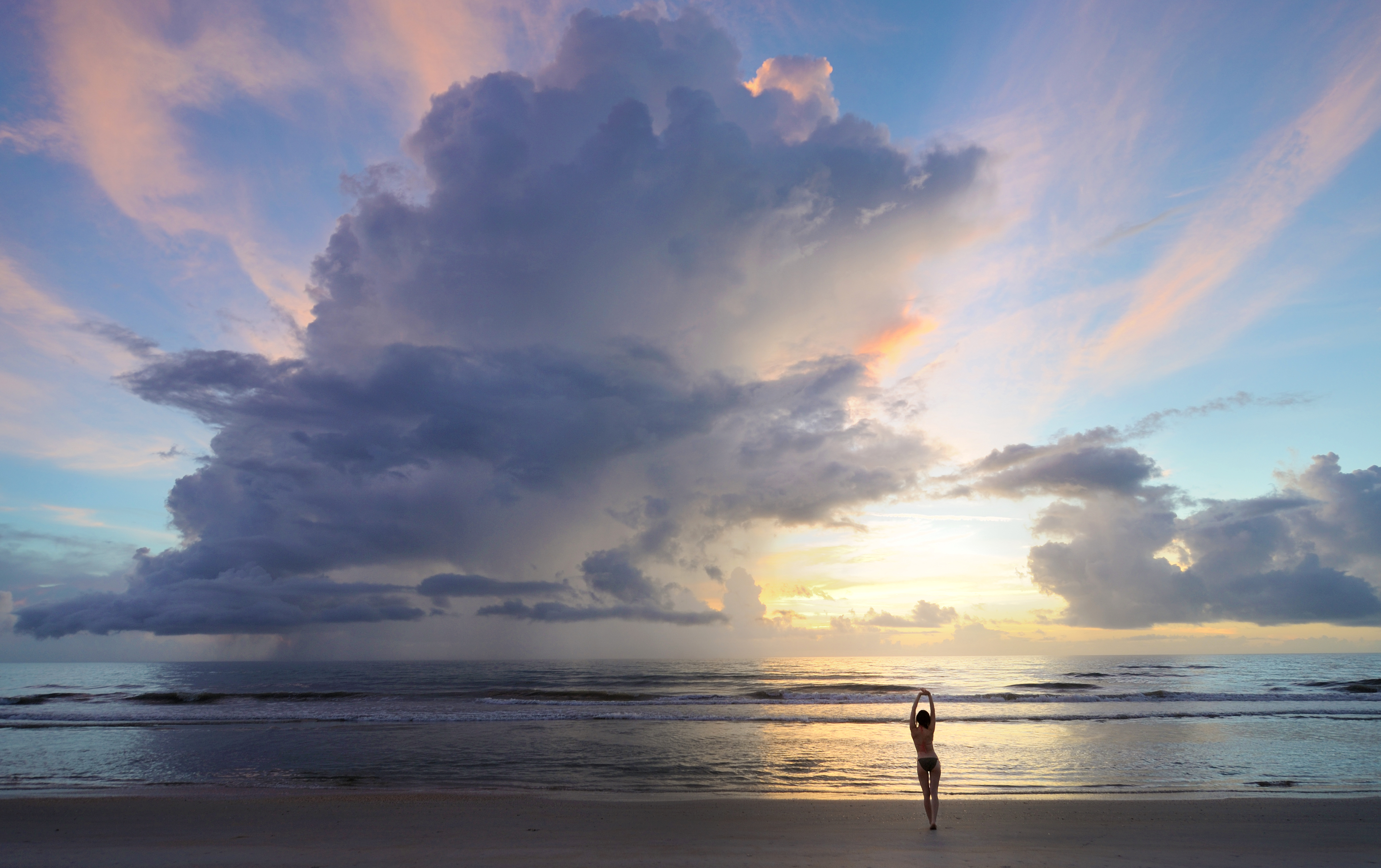
- An eastward view of the shoreline at sunrise

- Location within Florida Location within the United States
- Location: Brevard County and Volusia County, Florida, United States
- Nearest city: New Smyrna Beach, Florida and Titusville, Florida
- Coordinates: 28°46′03″N 80°46′37″W
- Area: 57,662 acres (23,335 ha)
- Established: January 3, 1975
- Visitors: 2,496,947 (in 2025)
- Governing body: National Park Service
- Website: Canaveral National Seashore

The Canaveral National Seashore (CANA) is a National Seashore located between New Smyrna Beach and Titusville, Florida, in Volusia and Brevard Counties. The park, located on a barrier island, was created on January 3, 1975, by an act of Congress. The park is split between Brevard and Volusia counties, with 9 miles of the seashore in Brevard County, and 15 miles of the seashore in Volusia County. CANA consists of 24 miles of beaches, dunes, mangrove wetlands, and a large portion of the Mosquito Lagoon. The Canaveral National Seashore is also the longest expanse of undeveloped land along the East Coast of Florida. The Canaveral National Seashore is home to more than 1,000 plant species and 310 bird species. CANA occupies 57,662 acres (23,335 ha) (including lagoons). There are 3 major beach sections in the seashore. The southern section is Playalinda Beach, the middle section is Klondike Beach, and the northern section is Apollo Beach.

== History ==
The National Park Service has documented 120 archaeological sites within the seashore. Their analysis shows Paleo-Indians began hunting and gathering and later cultivating in the area as early as 2000 B.C.E. Mounds and middens remain today as evidence of from this era. Snyder's Mound at Seminole Rest dates to their earliest period. Castle Windy is a 17 foot tall midden located on the barrier island, which dates from 1200 CE and continued for another 300 years. Turtle Mound, at 35 feet in height, is the largest midden. It dates to the historical period, called Surruque by early Spanish mapmakers, named for native people residing in the area. Later it became known as Turtle Mound as an obvious navigational landmark for sailors along the Florida Coast.

The names Canaveral and Los Moquitos, now Cape Canaveral and Mosquito Lagoon, noted by Spanish explorers in the sixteenth century are among the oldest place names in North America. Turtle Mound was documented by early naturalists William Bartram in 1774, and Andre Michaux in 1788.

As early as 1934, the National Park Service began investigating areas suitable for "national beach parks", leading to the establishment of Cape Hatteras National Seashore in 1937. In 1955, the National Park Service published Our Vanishing Shoreline (1955), which made the case for protecting undeveloped coastal areas for conservation and recreation. Following its publication, 126 undeveloped areas were identified with sixteen as a priority. One of those sites was Mosquito Lagoon and the undeveloped portions of the barrier island associated with it.

In 1961 NASA selected Cape Canaveral as the primary launch location for space exploration. Soon afterwards, NASA undertook acquisition of over 100 square miles of lands along the barrier island, Mosquito Lagoon, and mainland areas as a launch buffer. In 1963 NASA and the Department of Interior reached agreement to dedicate 25,000 acres as Merritt Island National Wildlife Refuge. Over the next decade the refuge was expanded to 140,000 acres. That same year Florida passed a bond issue to acquire lands for state parks and began purchasing lands along the barrier island south of Turtle Mound which had previously been acquired a state historical site.

By 1968 there was growing community support for establishment of a national seashore. During this time artist-environmentalist Doris Leeper led efforts to stop proposed developments on the barrier island. On April 26, 1968, the Volusia County Board of Commissioners passed Resolution No. 68-51 requesting the Department of the Interior to establish a National Seashore on the east coast of Volusia County, Florida. In 1968, William "Bill" Chappell and Lou Frey were elected to Congress and introduced legislation to establish the seashore. On April 5 and 6, 1974, Congressman Roy Taylor, chairman of the house subcommittee on National Parks and Recreation, brought a congressional party to review the proposed site. A second group, including chairman of the Senate National Parks and Recreation Committee, Senator Alan Bible, visited on April 19. Things then began to progress quickly. Florida State Parks committed to transfer approximately 4,000 acres of lands it had already acquired to the proposed seashore. On the other hand, the Department of Interior raised questions about possible conflicts with rocket launches at Cape Canaveral. The House passed the Seashore Act on December 3, with the Senate following suit on December 17. Still objecting, Department of Interior urged a veto of the bill, but on January 3, 1975, President Gerald Ford signed the bill into law. For many years, Representative Frey credited Doris Leeper as "the driving force behind establishment of Canaveral National Seashore".

== Recreation ==
The Canaveral National Seashore is a popular place for boaters, kayakers, fishers, sun-bathers, and hunters with many opportunities for recreation. It features numerous boat ramps and locations for launching kayaks, along with miles of beaches popular with locals and tourists.

The John F. Kennedy Space Center is located at the southern end of the barrier island occupied by Canaveral National Seashore, so access to the seashore is often restricted during launch-related activities at the space center. The Playalinda Beach has 13 parking lots numbered from the south. NASA's Launch Complex 39B and SpaceX's Launch Complex 39A are easily visible from the approach of the Parking Lot 1 as well as most of the beach. Playalinda is usually a popular location for the public to get a close viewing of launches from Kennedy Space Center and Cape Canaveral Space Force Station. Although space is limited and viewing areas are pushed back depending on the launch. A 2026 ranking of U.S. states by the number of natural beaches highlighted Playalinda Beach as the representative beach for Florida.

The seashore also is home to 2 nude beaches. Nudists frequent Apollo beach between parking lot 5 on the New Smyrna side, and parking lot 13 for Playalinda Beach on the Titusville side. Nudity is legal in the seashore's Volusia County sections past parking lot 5, but is illegal in the Brevard County sections. Those who wish to sunbathe or swim nude on Playalinda are supposed to walk about a mile North on the beach to enter the Volusia County section of Playalinda, though the law is sporadically enforced, and Playalinda has a reputation of being a clothing-optional beach.

Fishing and hunting are extremely popular in the seashore. On the beaches, anglers target species such as pompano, whiting, bluefish, and sharks. On the Mosquito Lagoon side of the seashore, there are a few fishing piers accessible from the roads. Shoreline anglers target species such as speckled trout, redfish, sheepshead, black drum and mangrove snapper. Over 2/3 of the entire seashore consists of the Mosquito Lagoon, and there are several kayak and motorboat launches that are located within the seashore. Hunters often launch from the seashore to enter the neighboring Merritt Island Wildlife Refuge during hunting season, as hunters are allowed to hunt waterfowl, deer, and wild pigs on specific days of the week in portions of the seashore and the refuge during hunting season. A few popular waterfowl targets are Canada goose, teal duck, and wood duck.

== Gallery ==
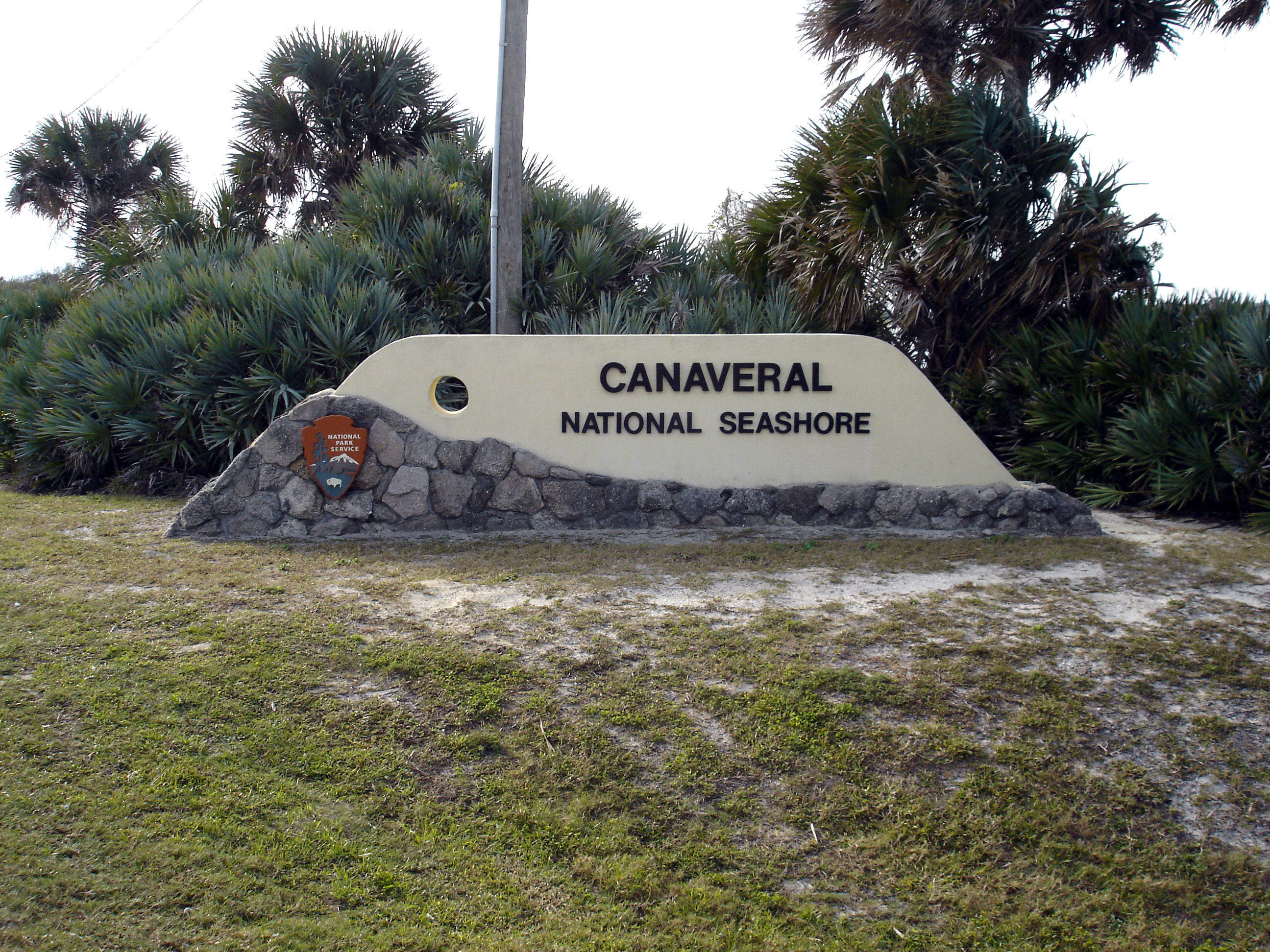
The New Smyrna Beach entrance to the park

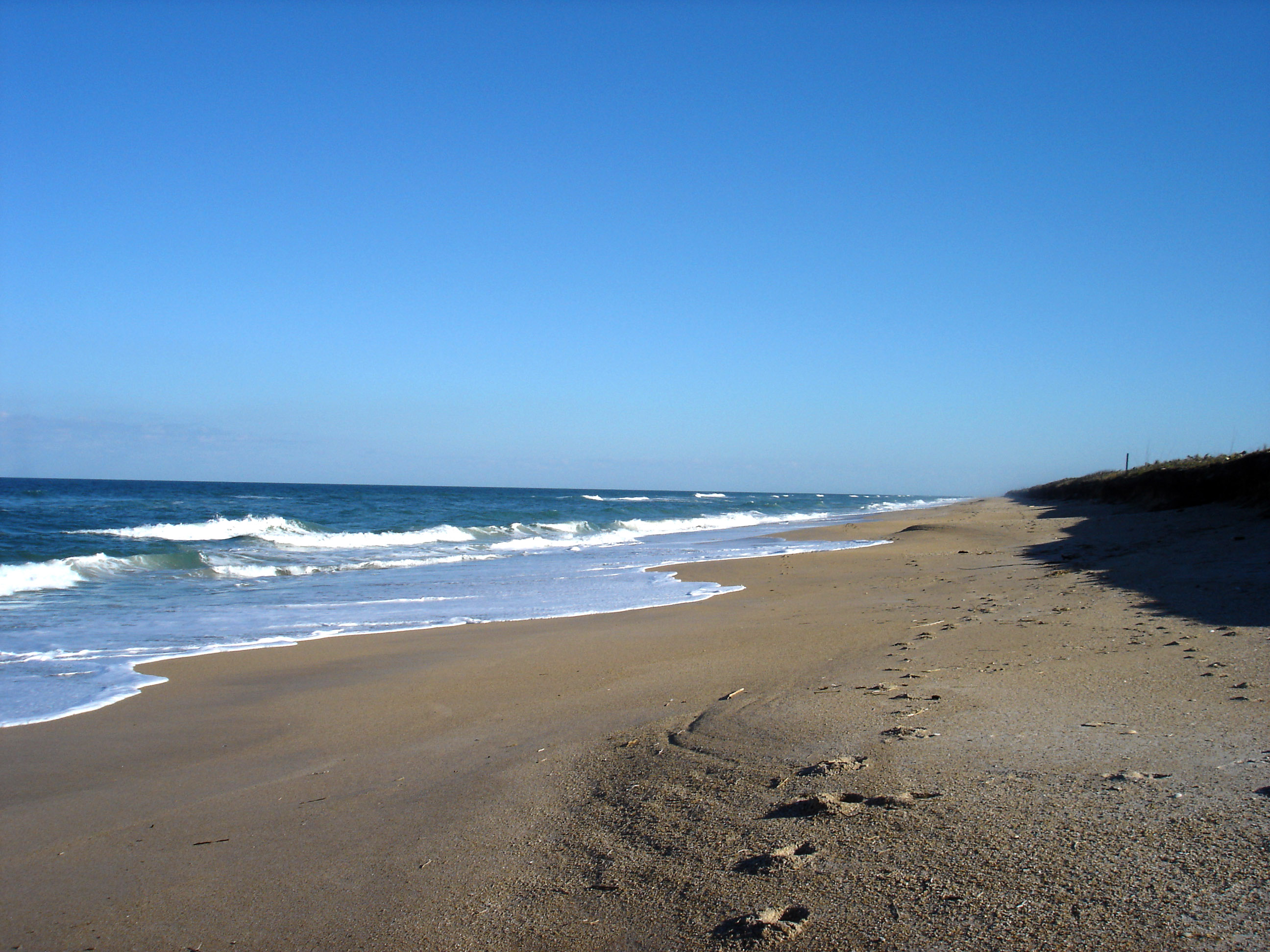
A view south-southeastward, down the shore

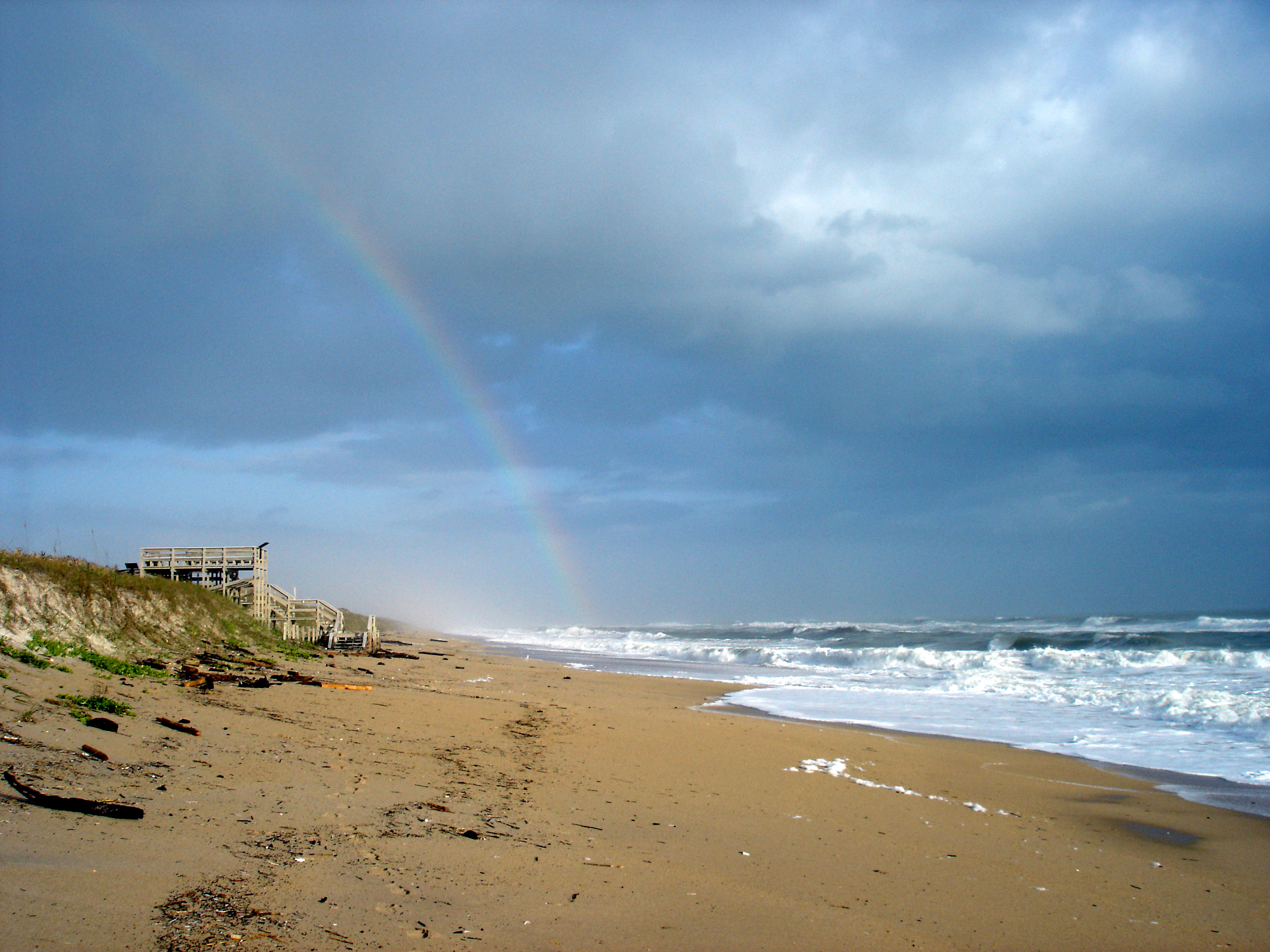
A north-northwestward view, up the shore

Castle Windy Trail

Looking north, in the southern part of the seashore

== See also ==
- Eldora, Florida
- Old Haulover Canal
- Ross Hammock Site
- Seminole Rest
- Turtle Mound
