= Seminole Rest =

Historic house in Florida, United States

- U.S. National Register of Historic Places
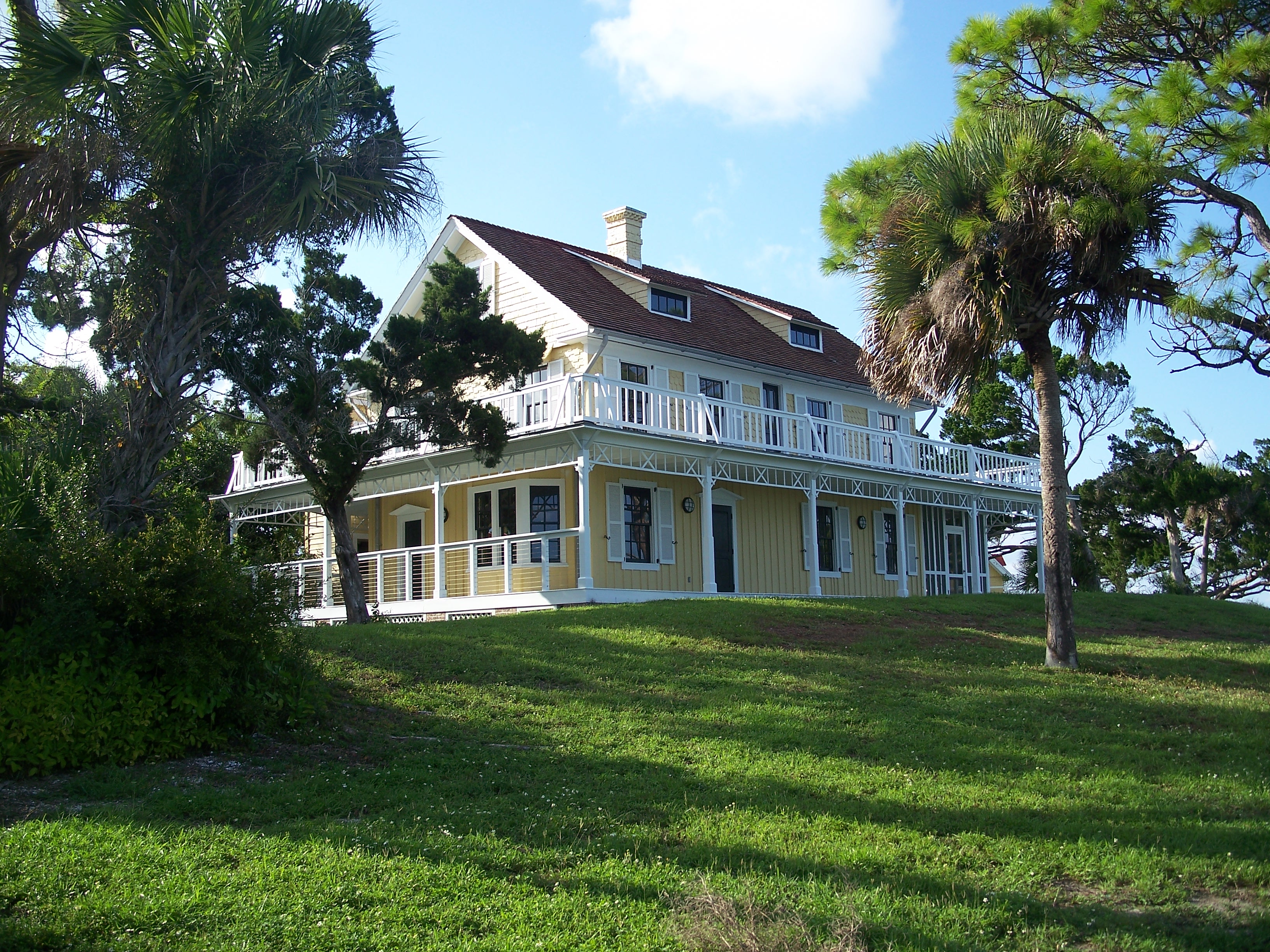
- Instone House, in the Seminole Rest Park

- Location within Volusia County
- Location: 207 River Road; Oak Hill, Florida
- Coordinates: 28°52′11″N 80°50′15″W
- NRHP reference No.: 97000231
- Added to NRHP: March 19, 1997

Seminole Rest (also known as the Snyder Hill or Oak Hill or Live Oak Hill) is a historic site in Oak Hill, Florida, United States. It is located east of State Road 5, on the western shore of Mosquito Lagoon, and is part of the Canaveral National Seashore. On March 19, 1997, it was added to the U.S. National Register of Historic Places.

== References and external links ==
- Volusia County listings at National Register of Historic Places
- Seminole Rest at Florida's Office of Cultural and Historical Programs
