= Point Reyes Lifeboat Station =

- U.S. National Register of Historic Places
- U.S. National Historic Landmark
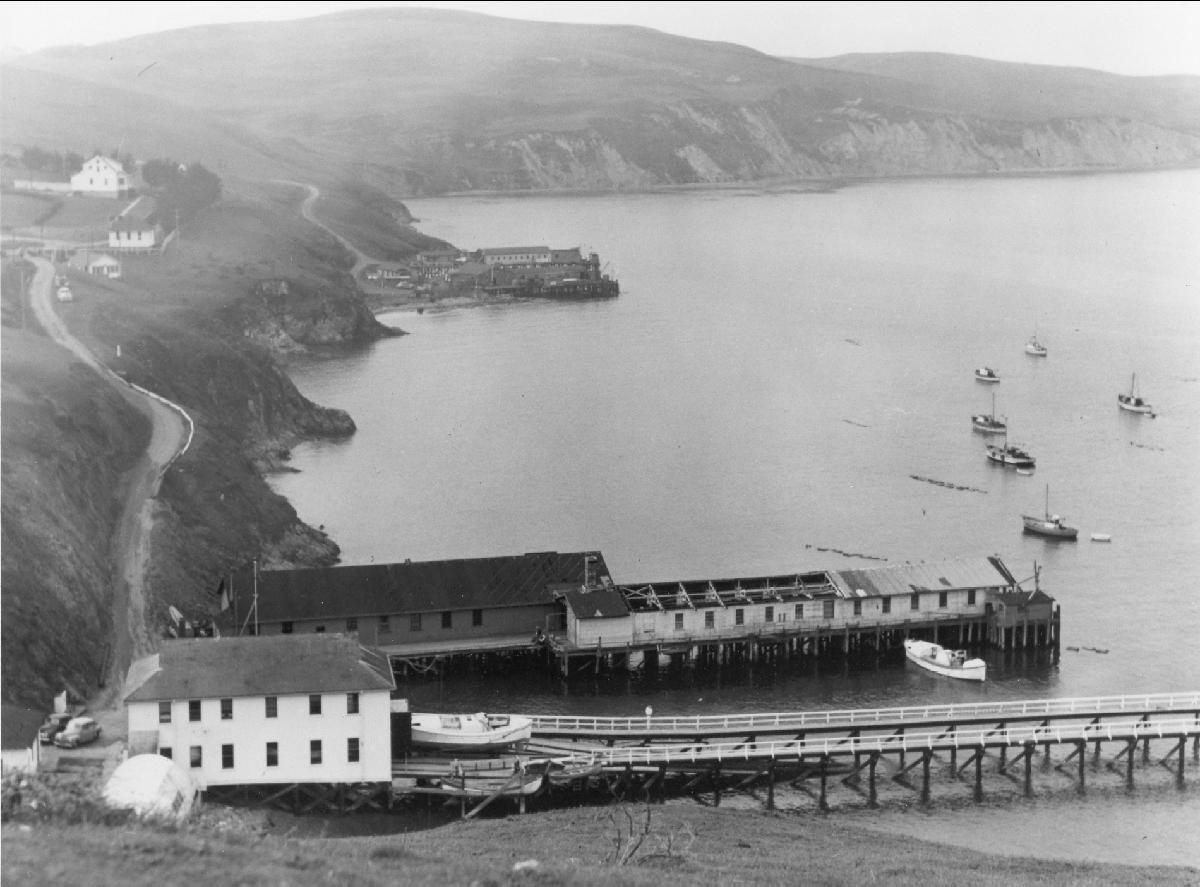
- view from the west-northwest, circa 1960

- Location within California Location within the United States
- Nearest city: Inverness, California
- Coordinates: 37°59′38″N 122°58′26″W
- Area: 13 acres (5.3 ha)
- Built: 1927
- Architect: Maurer, Fred J.; US Coast Guard
- NRHP reference No.: 85002756

Significant dates
- Added to NRHP: November 7, 1985
- Designated NHL: December 20, 1989

Point Reyes Lifeboat Station, also known as Point Reyes Lifeboat Rescue Station, is a historic coastal rescue station, located on the Drake's Bay side of Point Reyes in northern California, United States. It was built in 1927 by the United States Lifesaving Service to replace a previous station dating from 1888. It is one of the best-preserved rescue stations of that period on the Pacific coast, retaining elements often lost, including the boat launching infrastructure. It is now a historic property managed by the National Park Service as part of Point Reyes National Seashore. It was listed on the National Register of Historic Places in 1985, and it was further declared a National Historic Landmark in 1989.

== Description and history ==
Point Reyes, located north of San Francisco, has been a major landmark on the California coast since the 16th century, and its topography has also rendered it a graveyard for ships. The point is a roughly triangular projection from the mainland, whose southwestern tip has eastern and western projections. The Point Reyes Lighthouse is located at the western projection, exposed to the Pacific Ocean, while the lifeboat station is located on the sheltered north side of the eastern projection, facing Drake's Bay. Its principal features are a pier and boathouse, the latter set at the land end of the former. The boathouse is 2-1/2 stories in height, with a hip roof and clapboarded exterior. Its ground floor functions as a boat dock, designed to house a 36-foot (11 m) motor boat (the standard rescue boat of the service at the time) and a surfboat. The upper floor provided living quarters for the station crew. The chief officer's quarters were located in a secondary building, set further up the hillside to the west.

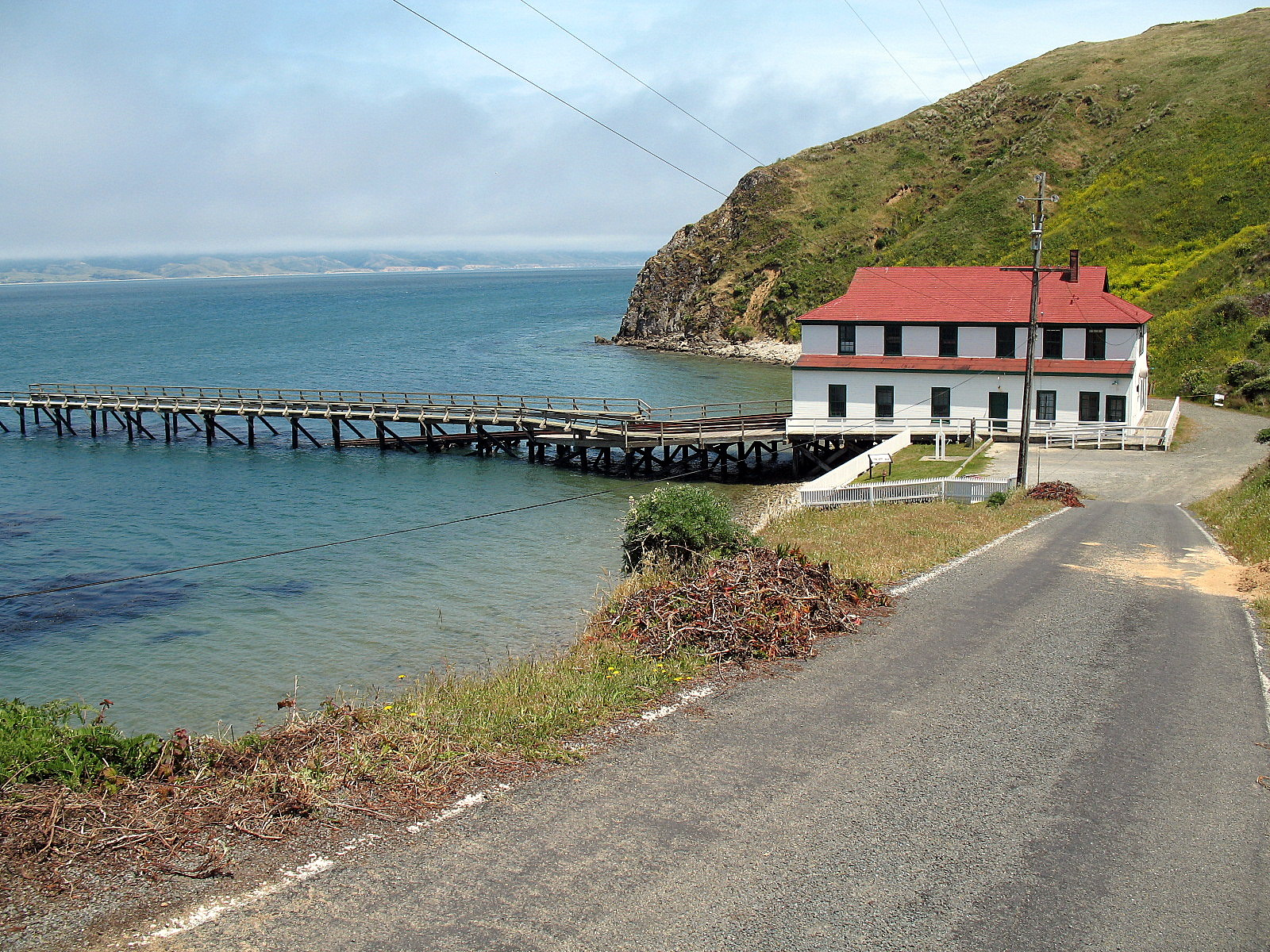

Important surviving features of the station include a set of rails used for launching the boats. These are about 100 feet (30 m) long, extending into the water some 60 feet (18 m), resting on wooden planking on land, and pilings in the water. Inside the boathouse there are launching cradles, one of which holds CG 36542, one of the rescue boats used during the station's active service period.

Due to the dangers of navigating around Point Reyes, it was an early candidate for a life-saving station on the American west coast. In 1888, the United States Lifesaving Service established a station on Ten-Mile Beach, a site from which rescue launches were found to be difficult due to the dangerous surf. This site was purchased in 1913, but was not significantly developed right away, due to World War I, and the merger of the service into the new United States Coast Guard. The station was built in 1927. It remained in service until 1968, and was transferred to the National Park Service the following year. Rescue services were taken over by a new station at Bodega Bay, which was capable of handling the Coast Guard's new standard 44-foot (13 m) rescue boats.

== See also ==
- List of National Historic Landmarks in California
- National Register of Historic Places listings in Marin County, California
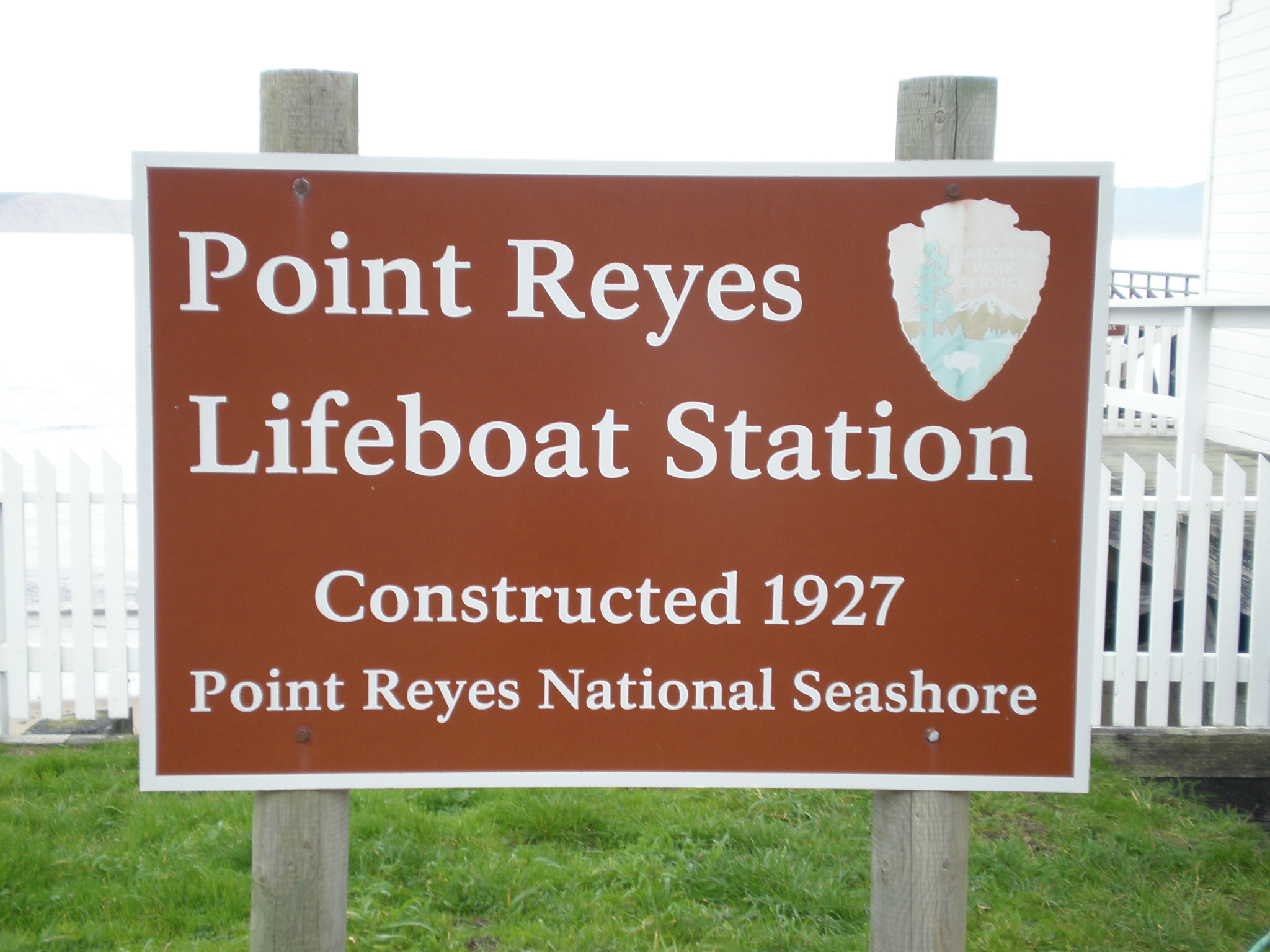

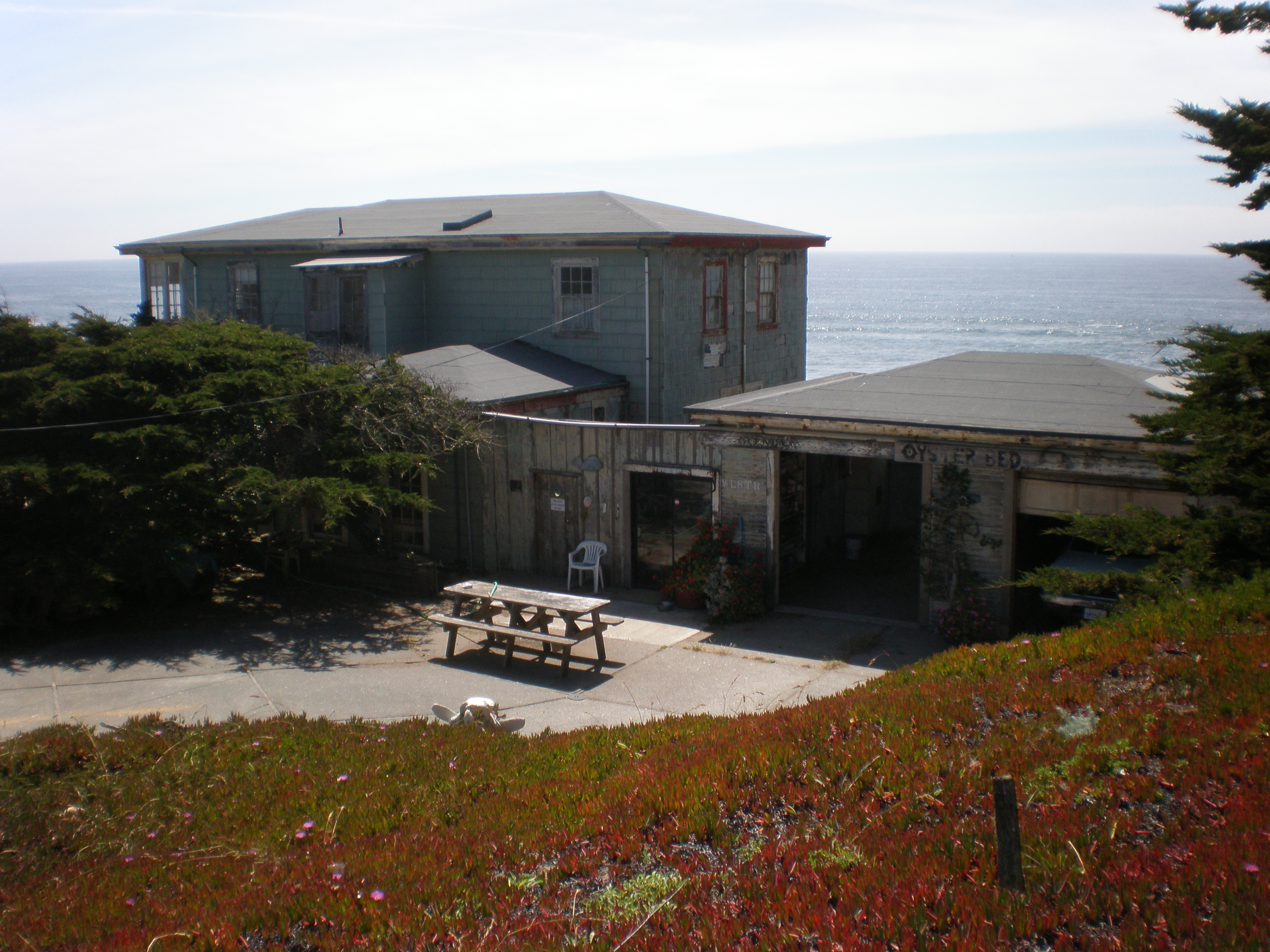
The buildings from the first lifeboat station are now housing for rangers

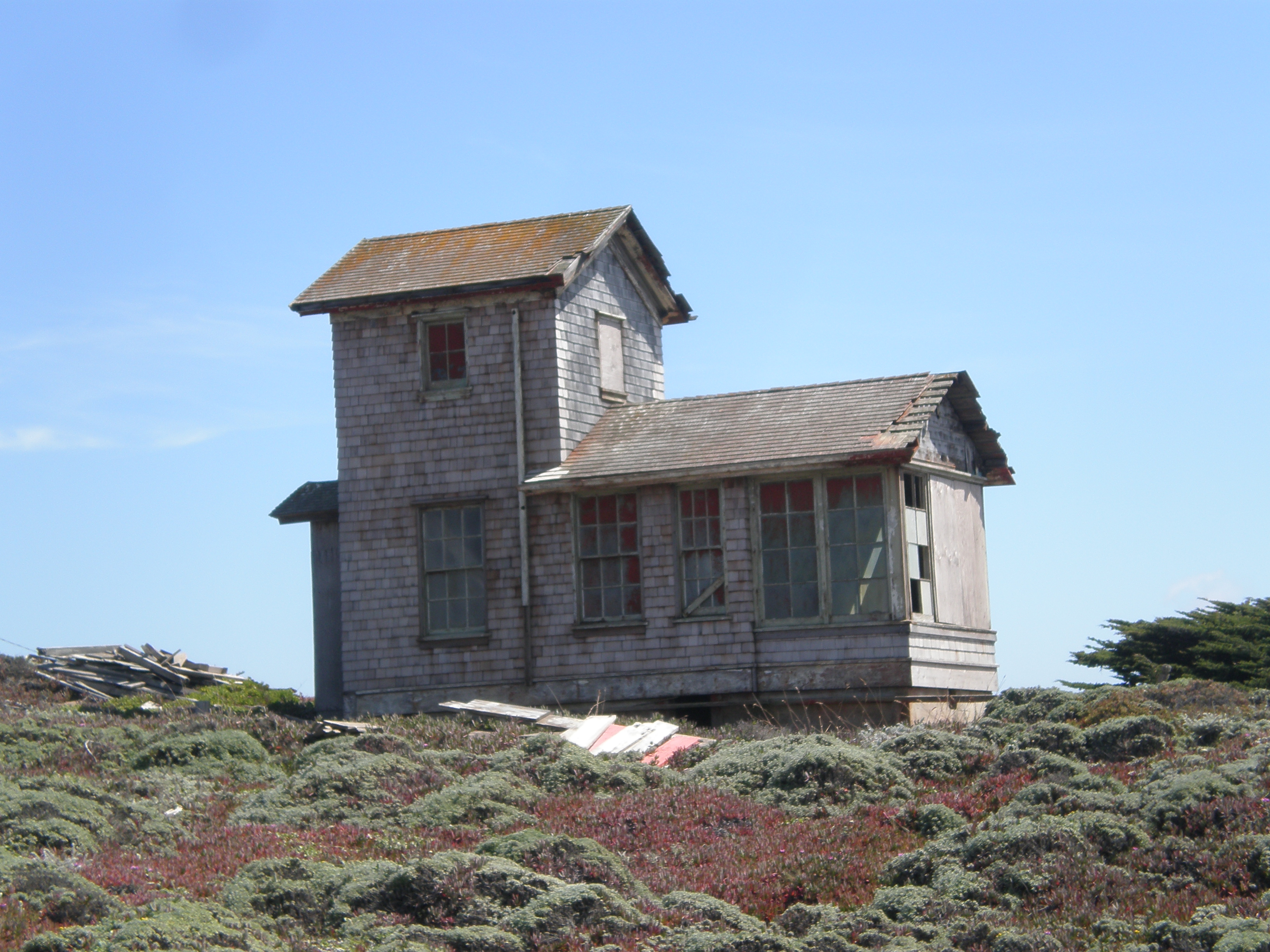
The radio compass building from when the Navy occupied the first lifeboat station
