= Dayton Historic District =

Dayton Historic District may refer to:

- Dayton Historic District (Dayton, Indiana)
- Dayton Historic District (Dayton, Virginia)
- Downtown Dayton Historic District, a National Register of Historic Places listing in Columbia County, Washington

== See also ==
- Dayton-Campbell Historic District, Hamilton, Ohio
- Dayton Street Historic District, Cincinnati, Ohio
- Dayton Terra-Cotta Historic District, a National Register of Historic Places listing in Dayton, Ohio
- Dayton View Historic District, Dayton, Ohio
- Daytona Beach Surfside Historic District, Daytona Beach, Florida
- East Dayton Street Historic District, a National Register of Historic Places listing in Dane County, Wisconsin
