= Edward H. Armstrong =

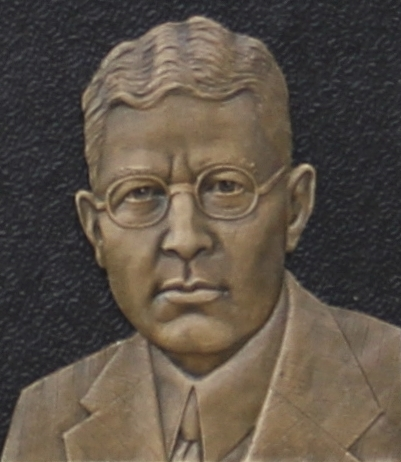
- Bronze Bust Engraving of Edward H. Armstrong which is on the Edward H. Armstrong Monument plaque.
- Born: July 23, 1880; St. Louis, Missouri, US
- Died: January 2, 1938 (aged 57); Jacksonville, Florida, US
- Occupations: Businessman and Politician
- Title: Mayor
- Spouse: Irene (m. 1902–1938)
- Children: Howard Mizner Armstrong (born 1905); Anna Madeleine Armstrong (born 1906)
- Parent(s): Father: Ben Armstrong; Mother: Mollie Armstrong

Edward H. Armstrong (July 23, 1880 – January 2, 1938) was an American politician who served five terms as the Mayor of Daytona Beach, Florida, during the 1920s and 1930s. His tenure was defined by the complexities of the Great Depression and the Jim Crow era, including pervasive racial segregation and poll taxes.

Armstrong was noted for maintaining a strong political coalition that included support from Black voters—an unusual occurrence in the segregated South—which he secured by directing municipal aid and infrastructure improvements toward Black communities. Often described as a political game changer, Armstrong has remained a central figure in Daytona Beach’s history for his assertive leadership style and his role in the city's early 20th-century development.

== Early life ==
Edward Howard Armstrong was born in St. Louis, Missouri and moved to Daytona, Florida in 1900 to work as a salesman for the Ralston Purina Company Flour Mill. He later opened up a grocery store called the Armstrong Grocery Company. By 1927, he owned several grocery stores throughout the east central Florida area.

== Political career ==
On October 6, 1925, the soon to be consolidated city of Daytona Beach held its first municipal election and H. F. Brass was elected mayor. In 1926, the city of Daytona Beach was officially created from the merger of the city of Daytona and the towns of Daytona Beach and Seabreeze. Armstrong entered the Daytona Beach municipal election in 1927 as a candidate for mayor and had competition from three other candidates. With a local reputation as a successful businessman, and a well organized campaign, where he was able to gain the support of black voters via a biracial political coalition, he won the election. He was sworn into office in 1928 for his first term which lasted until 1929. He was defeated for re-election in 1929. In 1930, he made a political comeback by winning the mayor's office with 43% of the white vote and 82% of the black vote. During the 1933 election black voters were being purposely delayed at polls, preventing them from voting. Armstrong managed to convince Florida's Governor David Sholtz to mobilize the National Guard and keep the polls open until 9:30pm. This enabled about 550 black voters to vote later than the original poll closing time of 6:00pm, which assisted Armstrong in winning the 1933 "military election". In 1935, Daytona Beach created polling places in black neighborhoods which reduced the obstruction of black voters that had occurred during the previous election. Armstrong obtained a landslide victory with 91% of the black vote and 54% of the white vote, securing the mayor's office once again. In 1937, he was as politically strong as ever during his career as he won the election by a five-to-one margin with 91% of the black vote and 54% of the white vote.

=== Political opposition and legacy ===
During Armstrong's political career as Mayor his political opponents, critics and the area's largest newspaper the Daytona Beach News-Journal, often accused him of corruption that included buying votes, squandering and misappropriating funds, political favoritism and tampering with elections. His administration required city employees to kick back 10% of their pay and as a result he was sometimes referred to as "10-cent Ed". However, his administration (called "The Armstrong Machine") was able to accomplish many positive changes, including the award of New Deal funding for municipal projects that included upgrading city waterworks, public docks, the bus system, the municipal airport, and the building of the Oceanfront Park complex (which originally included a large beachfront park that had several small rectangular pavilions, octagonal kiosks, a bathhouse, coquina rock veneered shops and stores, concessions and game rooms, and two coquina rock veneered pedestrian underpasses). The surviving parts of the original park are the Daytona Beach Coquina Clock Tower, Daytona Beach Bandshell and the Edward H. Armstrong Monument. He maintained the almost unanimous support of black voters throughout his career and was able to gain the support of white voters in increasing numbers, as he was credited for improving the local economy and public services during the hard times of the Great Depression.

=== Praise from Mary McLeod Bethune ===
Mary McLeod Bethune praised Armstrong in a December 31, 1929 letter as she confirmed the appreciation of his accomplishments by many of his contemporaries as she wrote:

His Honor, Mayor E. H. Armstrong, of Daytona Beach, Florida.

Greetings,

May I be permitted, on behalf of the Colored citizens of Daytona Beach, to extend to you, as the retiring head of the progressive, courageous administration, the congratulations you have so richly earned. Through you wisdom, vision, courage and efficiency, an administrative monument has been built in this city that can never be effaced by the passage of time. Children of tomorrow will rise up and call you blessed.

Your paved, lighted streets, your Beach Street parkage, your recreation centers, your ‘Greatest Board Walk on the Greatest Beach in the World,’ the transformation in and around the Fire Department, City Hall and Jail, attest to your efforts toward progress. Your fine spirit in the distribution of the city’s work among all of the citizens and your ability to attract and entertain the best in America and Europe demonstrate your fairness and forethought. All of these, together with your broad faith and courageous will-power, your unselfish spirit and real leadership, make you the capstone of administrative heads in the history of our fair city. At twelve o’clock tonight you will lay down your gavel as a hero who has accomplished a great work for his fellowman.

A great galaxy of friends and admirers who have vision and who know how to appreciate progress, will join in the chorus – ‘he has been a good and faithful servant.’ May these congratulatory sentiments extend to your administrative force. With gratitude for all that you have done, and for the privilege of cooperating with you in your great program of service, I am sincerely yours.

Mary McLeod Bethune

President, Bethune-Cookman College

(Formerly the Daytona Normal and Industrial Institute)

=== Battle of Daytona Beach ===
In 1936, the Florida Legislature, led by Governor Sholtz (who was a local political opponent of Armstrong), launched a state investigation into what was believed to be fiscal mismanagement of city, state and federal funds. The Daytona Beach city charter called for the dismissal, by the governor, of all officials responsible for the exceeding the budget. Assuming that they were going to be removed from office Daytona Beach Mayor Armstrong and two commissioners, George T. Robinson and R.W. Carswell resigned from their offices on December 10, 1936. Both Armstrong and Robinson appointed their wives to fill their office vacancies.

On December 30, 1936, Governor Sholtz ordered Mayor Irene Armstrong (Edward H. Armstrong's wife), three city commissioners, the city clerk and the city manager from their offices, holding them responsible for budget issues and poor judgement related to city affairs (misfeasance and incompetence). Sholtz appointed former city commissioner, Harry Wilcox, as mayor. But, Wilcox could not assume office because the Daytona Beach City Hall building was locked and barricaded. Two hundred National Guardsmen were ordered to Daytona Beach to install new officials appointed by Sholtz, and to confiscate the city's financial records. Approximately one hundred local policeman armed with riot guns and heavily armed city employees and supporters barricaded themselves inside the city hall building to protect Mayor Irene Armstrong and other city officials. Many city records were hauled away in garbage trucks and destroyed by city employees during this time.

A crowd of more than two thousand people gathered outside the building. It seemed an armed confrontation was about to occur. However, a temporary restraining order was issued by Circuit Court Judge Herbert Frederick that prevented the newly appointed officials from entering the building. On January 4, 1937, the Florida Supreme Court ruled to uphold the restraining order, and, on a technicality, vacated Governor Sholtz's orders to remove Daytona Beach city officials.

After a 5-day ordeal, the National Guardsmen and the crowds left the area. This incident, which made national headlines, is now known in local lore as the “Battle of Daytona Beach”. The ruling, in addition to Governor Sholtz's term ending and new Governor Fred P. Cone taking office and having no interest in challenging the court's decision allowed for Edward H. Armstrong, and the other city officials, to be reinstated into their former offices on March 4, 1937.

== Death ==
In late December 1937, following many months of failing health Armstrong was admitted into the Riverside Hospital in Jacksonville, Florida. On January 2, 1938, one day before the scheduled inauguration for his fifth term as Mayor, he died at the age of 57 of liver and heart complications following an operation he underwent the previous week. On the day of Armstrong's death the editor of the Daytona Beach Sunday News Journal, Herbert Davidson (who considered Armstrong the embodiment of crooked politics), had staff put together an extra edition with the headline "Mayor Armstrong Dead; End Comes at 9:38 A.M." The entire front page of this edition was dedicated to Armstrong's legacy. On January 5, 1938, a funeral service was held in Daytona Beach, Florida for Edward H. Armstrong that was attended by an estimated seven thousand people.

== Monument ==
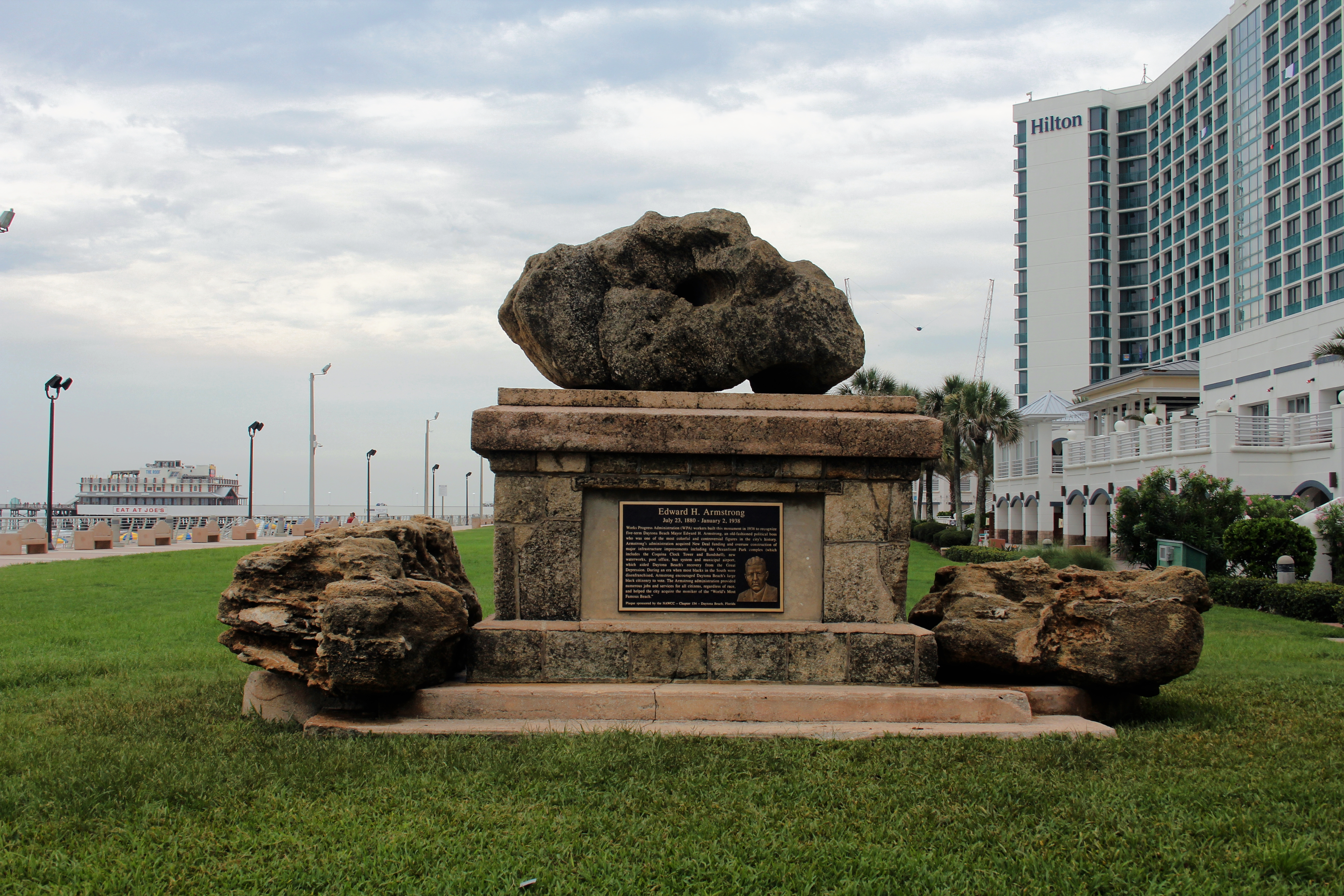
Edward H. Armstrong Monument and plaque

Located between the Daytona Beach Coquina Clock Tower and the Daytona Beach Bandshell in Oceanfront Park is a rather inconspicuous rectangular shaped concrete monument encased with a coquina rock veneer and three large roughly cut coquina rocks (one resting on the top and one on each of its sides) that is sitting on a concrete slab. This monument was built by the Works Progress Administration workers in 1938 to honor the man that was most responsible for the building of the Oceanfront Park complex.

Since Armstrong was so controversial during his political career local contemporaries and officials never agreed on the wording to recognize his achievements, so this monument sat in Oceanfront Park for 82 years with no marker, sign or plaque to identify it. The monument became a mystery over the decades as only a few people, including the vast majority of locals, actually knew what it was or why it was constructed. A grassroots effort was launched in 2018 by several members of the National Association of Watch and Clock Collectors - Daytona Beach chapter who were determined to design, purchase and install a plaque on the monument.

After more than a year and a half of lobbying, attending and speaking at several City of Daytona Beach Commission meetings a plaque was finally approved in November 2019 with a 4–3 vote. After 82 years of standing in obscurity in Daytona Beach's Oceanfront Park, and still cloaked in controversy, the Edward H. Armstrong Monument was finally publicly recognized.

The National Association of Watch and Clock Collectors - Daytona Beach chapter 154 designed, ordered and purchased a 20" x 30" bronze plaque. After receiving the plaque the NAWCC Daytona Beach chapter donated it to the City of Daytona Beach. On July 1, 2020, the city's Public Works department installed the plaque on the Edward H. Armstrong Monument, which ended its 82 years of obscurity. The plaque reads:

Edward H. Armstrong

July 23, 1880 - January 2, 1938

Works Progress Administration (WPA) workers built this monument in 1938 to recognize five-term Daytona Beach Mayor Edward H. Armstrong, an old-fashioned political boss who was one of the most colorful and controversial figures in the city's history. Armstrong's administration acquired New Deal funding and oversaw construction of major infrastructure improvements including the Oceanfront Park complex (which includes the Coquina Clock Tower and Bandshell), new waterworks, post office, bus system and municipal airport, which aided Daytona Beach's recovery from the Great Depression. During an era when most blacks in the South were disenfranchised, Armstrong encouraged Daytona Beach's large black citizenry to vote. The Armstrong administration provided numerous jobs and services for all citizens, regardless of race, and helped the city acquire the moniker of the "World's Most Famous Beach."

Plaque sponsored by the NAWCC - Chapter 154 - Daytona Beach, Florida
