= Daytona Beach Coquina Clock Tower =

- Daytona Beach Clock Tower and Fountain
- U.S. Historic district – Contributing property
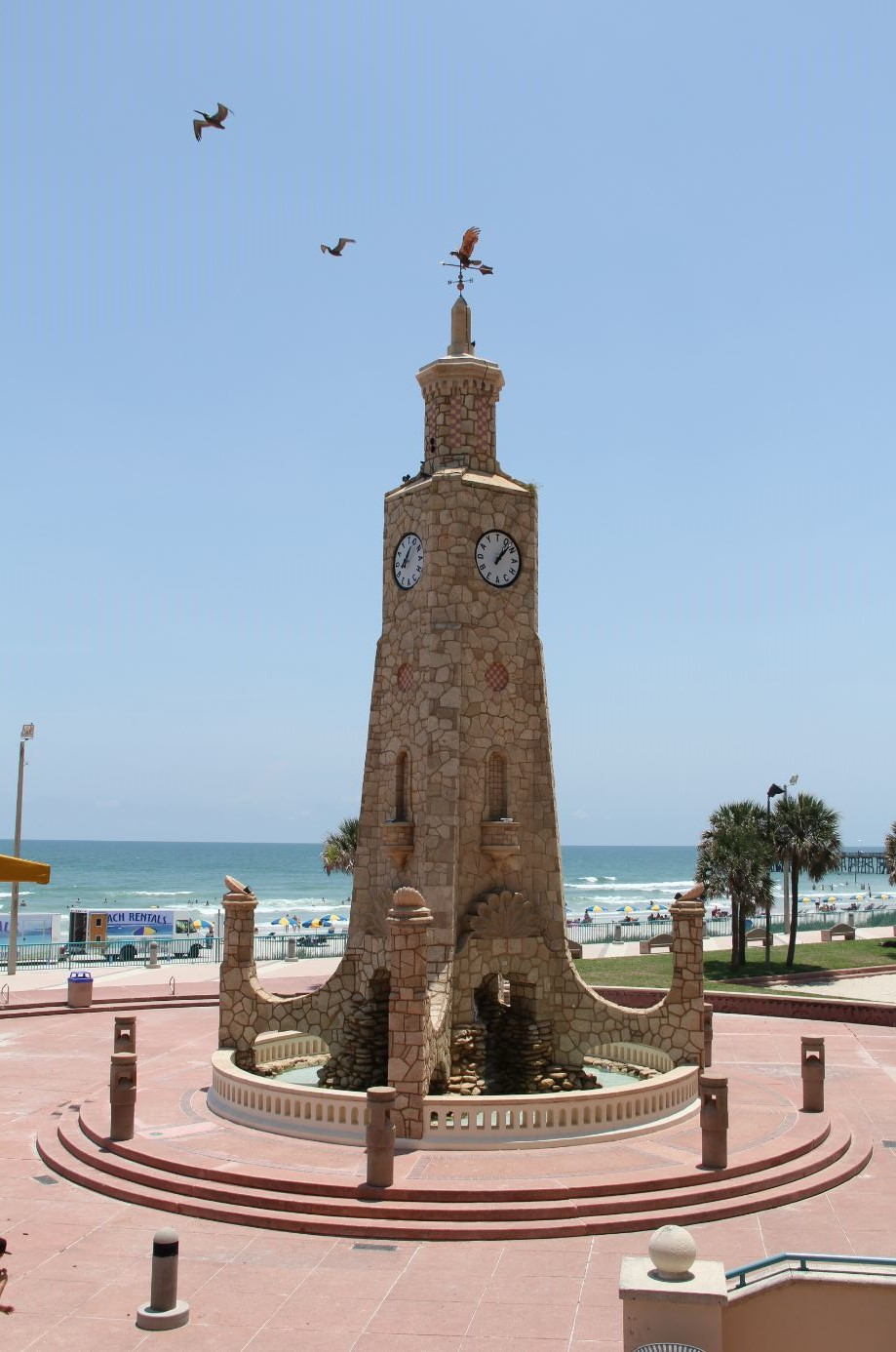
- A full view looking from the northwest at the Daytona Beach Coquina Clock Tower after the rehabilitation project was completed. Note the pelicans that are flying overhead. They are a common sight near the beach in the northeastern part of Florida.

- Location within Florida Location within the United States
- Location: Daytona Beach, Florida
- Coordinates: 29°13′46″N 81°0′30″W
- Built: 1937
- Built by: Works Progress Administration
- Architect: Alan J. MacDonough
- Architectural style: Late Gothic Revival
- Part of: Daytona Beach Bandshell and Oceanfront Park Complex (ID99000159)
- MPS: Daytona Beach MPS
- Designated CP: March 5, 1999

Daytona Beach Coquina Clock Tower is a clock tower located in Daytona Beach, Florida. It is a contributing property within the Daytona Beach Bandshell and Oceanfront Park Complex historic district which was entered into the United States National Register of Historic Places (VO7135) on February 25, 1999 from a multiple property submission under the following areas of significance: Entertainment, Recreation, Community Planning and Development, and Architecture.

== Early history ==
The Oceanfront Park Complex property was constructed of concrete and coquina rock between 1936 and 1937 by the Works Progress Administration (WPA). It originally was a large beachfront park that included several small rectangular pavilions, octagonal kiosks, a bathhouse, coquina rock veneered shops and stores, concessions and game rooms, two coquina rock veneered pedestrian underpasses, a coquina rock veneered Bandshell and its spectator seating area, the Edward H. Armstrong Monument, and a coquina rock veneered Clock Tower and Fountain.

In the 1930s, Daytona Beach was in the midst of a severe economic depression (the Great Depression). City officials needed a way to bring tourists to the area despite the economic woes of the time. In 1934, Daytona Beach Mayor Edward H. Armstrong and other city officials began a two-year lobbying effort to the federal government to build a large outdoor amphitheater complex. In January 1936 the project was approved under the jurisdiction of the WPA with the stipulation that the city of Daytona Beach add a large amount of money into the project. A prominent local architect, Alan J. MacDonough, Sr., (who designed several buildings that are now on the United States’ National Register of Historic Places), was hired to design the entire complex. The project started in 1936 as WPA workers excavated and removed more than 48,000 cubic yards of sand to level the construction site area.

In the beginning of the project WPA workers used local beach sand to fill the foundation area and salt water to mix the concrete. The base began to crack and crumble due to this poor quality construction technique. Delays occurred when the base had to be broken up and removed and the concrete had to be poured again using the proper construction process by the use of clean fresh water to mix the concrete and gravel was used to fill the foundation area. Questions and concerns were raised by state officials regarding the management of the project as the delays caused financial problems.

The Florida Legislature, led by Governor David Sholtz launched a state investigation. The Daytona Beach city charter called for the dismissal, by the governor, of all officials responsible for the exceeding the budget. Assuming that they were going to be removed from office Daytona Beach Mayor Edward Armstrong and two commissioners, George T. Robinson and R.W. Carswell resigned from their offices on December 10, 1936. Both Armstrong and Robinson appointed their wives to fill their office vacancies.

On December 30, 1936, Governor Sholtz ordered Mayor Irene Armstrong (Edward Armstrong's wife), three city commissioners, the city clerk and the city manager to resign from their offices, holding them responsible for budget issues and poor judgement related to city affairs. Two hundred National Guardsmen were ordered to Daytona Beach to install new officials that were appointed by Sholtz, and to confiscate the city's financial records (including those associated with the clock tower's project.) Approximately one hundred local policeman and heavily armed city employees barricaded themselves inside the city hall building to protect Mayor Irene Armstrong and other city officials. Many city records were destroyed by city employees during this time.

A crowd of more than two thousand people gathered outside the building. It seemed an armed confrontation was about to occur. Fortunately, a temporary restraining order was issued by Circuit Court Judge Herbert Frederick that prevented the newly appointed officials from entering the building. On January 4, 1937 the Florida Supreme Court ruled to uphold the restraining order, and on a technicality, vacated Governor Sholtz's orders to remove Daytona Beach city officials.

After a 5-day standoff the National Guardsmen and the crowds left the area and the near disastrous incident is now known in local lore as the “Battle of Daytona Beach”. The ruling, in addition to Governor Sholtz's term ending and new Governor Fred P. Cone taking office and having no interest in challenging the court's decision allowed for Edward Armstrong, and the other city officials, to be reinstated into their former offices on March 4, 1937.

By the summer of 1937, a majority of the project was completed. The project's final cost exceeded $300,000 (approximately $84,000 came from the city of Daytona Beach.) The park complex was one of the largest of its kind anywhere in the world at the time. The dedication of the park complex was held on Independence Day, July 4, 1937. But several delays with completing associated facilities in the park caused the official dedication to be held on January 1, 1938. Sadly, Mayor Edward Armstrong was not able to attend the dedication services and the next day he died. Since he was the person most responsible for the building of the park complex WPA workers erected a monument in the park in his honor (to this day the monument does not have any inscriptions).

The original mid-1930s clockworks were a Seth Thomas Clock Company 8-day timepiece, Model #4 - 1912 tower clock movement with serial number 3180. This movement had a 4 foot long pendulum with a 28 lb. pendulum ball. It featured a power wind mechanism with a mercury switch that included a power reserve of 2 to 3 hours. When the weights dropped to a fixed distance the mercury switch was triggered which then activated the power wind mechanism to automatically rewind the weights. The movement was eventually converted to a full electric motor driven mechanism (electrified) in the 1980s.

== 1986-87 redevelopment project ==
A redevelopment project that took place between 1986 and 1987 featured the construction of the Marriott Convention Hotel which caused the removal of several original structures in Oceanfront Park. The original structures that were demolished included the small rectangular pavilions, octagonal kiosks, bathhouse, coquina rock veneered shops and stores, and the concessions and game rooms. (The original underpasses were closed in 1974 and completely filled in with gravel and dirt to prevent vagrancy.) The surviving parts of the original park are the Daytona Beach Bandshell and its spectator seating area, the Edward H. Armstrong Monument, and the Daytona Beach Clock Tower and Fountain.

== 52nd Anniversary Ceremony ==
The Clock Tower's 52nd Anniversary rededication ceremony was a big success thanks to NAWCC member, the late Jack Smith. Due to a lack of maintenance and routine service, in addition to severe encrusted bird droppings contamination the clockworks had stopped working and Daytona Beach officials thought that it might never work again. Smith volunteered his time and clock repairing skills and was able to get the clock movement cleaned up, serviced and back into running order in time for the rededication ceremony. During the July 4, 1989 rededication ceremony Daytona Beach Mayor Larry Kelly, said to Jack, "You helped us do it. Thanks a billion."

== Clock Tower renamed ==
The city of Daytona Beach's Historic Preservation Advisory Board renamed the Daytona Beach Coquina Clock Tower in honor of Sir Malcolm Campbell (the famous automobile speedster who set numerous world land speed records on city beaches.) This name change was prompted in 1989 when Campbell Street was renamed in recognition of Dr. Martin Luther King Jr. The city was in search of permanent recognition of Campbell's achievements so the renaming of the beachside Clock Tower was an excellent and obvious choice. A commemorative bronze plaque is mounted on a large piece of coquina rock in the east side fountain area and it reads, “Sir Malcolm Campbell, Honoring his land speed record of 276.82 mph achieved on these sands in 1935. Daytona Beach City Commission, Mayor Baron ‘Bud’ Asher, Historic Preservation Board, Rededicated Sept. 27, 2002.”

== Assessment report and rehabilitation project ==
The Renker-Eich-Parks Architects firm was hired by the city of Daytona Beach to inspect the Daytona Beach Clock Tower and write a Condition Assessment Report. This report includes sections on the Physical Condition Assessment and Preservation/Restoration Recommendations. A summary of the condition states that the four French style buttresses have some eroded coquina rock, there are several areas that require new mortar and the entire structure requires new electrical wiring that is up-to-date with current codes.

Recommended Priority Work includes: Repoint Deteriorated Mortar Joints, Reset Grotto Coquina Stone where missing, Repair Cast Concrete Sconce Base, Re-mortar Joints at Clock Room Roof, Repair Concrete at Clock Room Roof, Replace damaged/missing wood structure, Treat Algae inside Cupola and Clock Room, Replace Rusting Clock Bracket Fasteners, Patch Coat at Clock Openings, Restore Spire [discard the stainless steel base cap with petals as it not historically correct] and Weather Vane, Clean Bird Nests/General Cleaning, Structural – Concrete Repair at Hatch Floor, Electrical (remove all existing electrical items from the structure and replace them with new electrical lights, wiring, panels, receptacles and controls.)

Recommended Non-Priority Work includes: Replace Coquina Veneer Stone on Buttress Arch Tops, Remove Stainless Steel Rods and Hooks (patch holes), and Paint Stone Checker Pattern Infills (Red and Yellow).

Clockworks: Replace clock operating mechanisms and hands: Provide new master clock controller, new timepieces with new hands (hands shall match historic originals from photographs and with review and approval from architect), replace clock dials and exterior wood trim (ensure weather tight installation.)

Although there is obviously numerous interior and exterior maintenance issues with the Daytona Beach Clock Tower the conclusion of this report found it to be in overall fair condition.

Based on the Condition Assessment Report and recognizing that the historic Daytona Beach Coquina Clock Tower has been in deteriorating condition for many years a Historic Preservation Small Matching Grant for the rehabilitation of the Daytona Beach Clock Tower was submitted to the state of Florida's Division of Historic Resources, Bureau of Historic Preservation on May 30, 2014 for a Clock Tower Rehabilitation Project.

A total of $231,000 was awarded ($50,000 from a Florida Bureau of Historic Preservation grant and $181,000 from the city of Daytona Beach) for the project. The project will not modify or change the accessibility to the landmark site. Additionally, it will preserve the historic landmark and enhance public awareness of the Clock Tower structure.

The 2015/16 project was successfully completed ahead of schedule. Various new items have been installed and the structural restoration has been completed. New custom dials and hands were made by the Verdin Company in their Cincinnati, Ohio plant. The dials are made from 3/8” translucent acrylic sheet and the letters are made from 1/8” black acrylic. The hands are made from an aluminum composite material and finished with automotive-grade acrylic urethane. The clock movements were replaced so all four dials now display the same accurate time.

The mortar joints have been repointed throughout the structure and the coquina rock pieces that were missing have been replaced. The blind oculus opening and the decorative inset grids on the cupola have been repainted. The entire structure has been rewired and new exterior and interior lighting has been installed. Lightning protective rods have been installed on the top of the tower. The fountain has been upgraded with a new motor and pump and it has been resurfaced as well.

== Hurricane Matthew Damage ==
In October 2016, Hurricane Matthew caused minor damage to one of the clock tower's dials and weather vane. The north facing dial was broken, most likely from a projectile from hurricane debris, and the eagle was blown off the top of the weather vane. A new replacement dial was made by the Verdin Company and installed in November 2016. The eagle was located, but was not re-installed due to considerable damage. A new replacement weather vane was made by American Bronze Foundry, Inc. and installed in April 2017. The electric movements and electrical wiring in the tower were inspected and the clock tower's four dials are displaying accurate time.
