= Seabreeze, Florida =

- Seabreeze Historic District
- U.S. National Register of Historic Places
- Location within Volusia County
- Location: Volusia County, Florida, US
- Nearest city: Daytona Beach
- Coordinates: 29°14′00″N 81°00′53″W
- Area: 1,700 acres (6.9 km^{2})
- Architect: Griffin, Harry, et al.
- Architectural style: Queen Anne, Late 19th And 20th Century Revivals, Late 19th And Early 20th Century American Movements
- MPS: Daytona Beach Multiple Property Submission
- NRHP reference No.: 98001131
- Added to NRHP: September 3, 1998

Seabreeze is a beachside neighborhood in Daytona Beach, Florida, which existed as an independent city from May 24, 1901, until January 1, 1926, when it merged with Daytona and Daytona Beach to become one consolidated city.

Seabreeze has been memorialized as the Seabreeze Historic District, a U.S. Historic District (designated as such on September 3, 1998). The district is bounded by University Boulevard, Halifax Road, Auditorium Boulevard, and North Atlantic Avenue. It contains 596 historic buildings.

== History ==
In 1884 David D. Rogers bought 47 acres (190,000 m^{2}) of land on the beach peninsula, east of Daytona, stretching from present-day Main Street on the north to Harvey Street on the south, and from the Atlantic Ocean on the east, to Pinewood Cemetery on the west. Rogers divided the property into lots for sale and named the development Seabreeze.

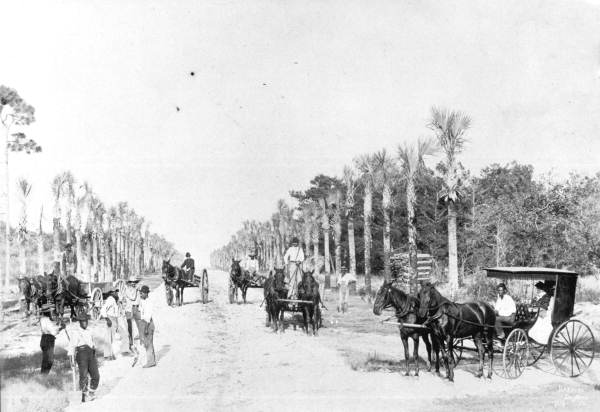
Early picture of Ocean Blvd. (Seabreeze Blvd.) 1893

In 1885, Charles A. Ballough built a homestead north of the Rogers development, roughly from the present-day Oakridge Boulevard, stretching north to the present University Boulevard. In 1886, Charles H. Brush built a homestead on 60 acres (240,000 m^{2}) of land between the Rogers and Ballough properties, stretching from the Atlantic Ocean on the east and about halfway across the peninsula. In 1888, Brush sold half of his property, which was developed into a subdivision.

In 1886, a post office named Halifax was established on the peninsula, located on the riverfront near present-day Main Street. In 1890, the Post Office Department changed the name of this post office to Seabreeze to match the name of Rogers' development.

In 1887, the first bridge was opened across the Halifax River from Daytona to the peninsula. It was called the Central Bridge (named the Main Street Bridge today, carrying CR 4040) and connected Fairview Ave. in Daytona to Seabreeze Ave. (named Main St. today), in old Daytona Beach.

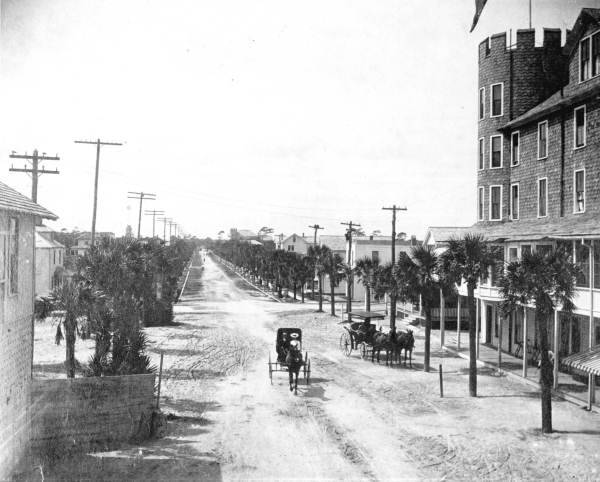
Westbound view down Ocean Blvd. (Seabreeze Blvd.), 1902

In 1892, Col. C. C. Post and his wife, Helen Wilmans Post, bought half of Ballough's property, which they turned into another development, and would later become the core of the town of Seabreeze. They opened Ocean Boulevard (today named Seabreeze Blvd.) from Valley St. (today named Halifax Ave.) to the ocean and paved it with marl. Col. Post built a store, an opera house, a printing office, and a residence for his family. Mrs. Post founded a school of "Mental Science" and began publishing a paper named "Freedom," on the subject.

The volume of mail connected with the "Mental Science" activities had grown so much, that by 1897, the Post Office Department decided to move the Seabreeze post office north to Ocean Blvd. The moving of "their" post office greatly upset the residents living around Seabreeze Ave., who petitioned the Post Office Department for a new post office. The request was granted in 1898, and a new post office was granted with the name of Goodall (named after Congressman Ernest Goodall of Maine), also located at the corner of Valley St. (Halifax Ave.) and Seabreeze Ave. (Main St.).

=== Incorporation ===
Historical population
Census	Pop.	Note	%±
1910	308		—
1920	571		85.4%
Seabreeze

On May 24, 1901, the citizens living in the Seabreeze post office area voted to incorporate the development. They elected Col. C. C. Post as the first mayor, chose five town council members and other officials. Mrs. Post promoted the new town as "City Beautiful."

In 1902, a bridge was constructed from Ocean Blvd. in Seabreeze to Mason Ave. on the mainland, at the northern border of Daytona. Originally called the North Bridge, it later became known as the Seabreeze Bridge.

On January 28, 1905, the residents around the Goodall post office assembled to discuss the matter of incorporation. Several meetings followed, until on March 23, 1905, and election meeting was held where 41 votes were cast for incorporation as Daytona Beach. The first mayor was E. E. Johnson. The dividing line between Daytona Beach and Seabreeze was located roughly at today's Auditorium Blvd.

=== Consolidation ===
In 1925, representatives of Daytona, Daytona Beach, and Seabreeze met to discuss merger of the three cities. On January 1, 1926, a consolidated City of Daytona Beach replaced the three smaller municipalities. This made Daytona the seventh largest city in Florida by population.

== See also ==
- List of Registered Historic Buildings in Daytona Beach, Florida
- Seabreeze High School

== Gallery ==
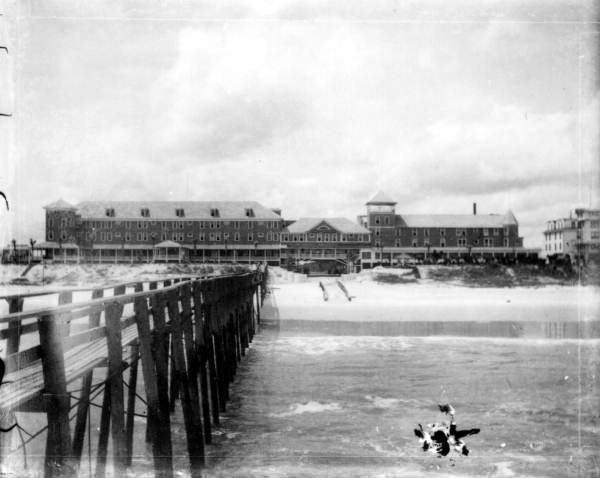
Clarendon Hotel, 1900

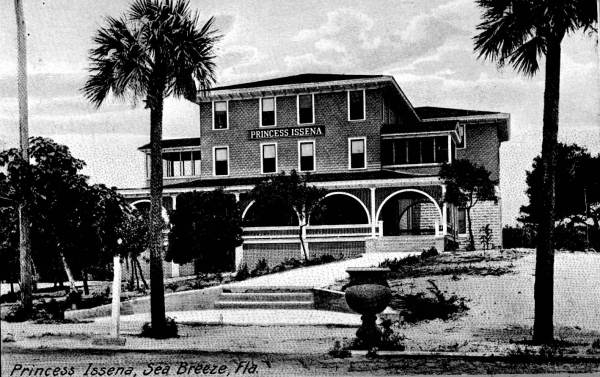
Princess Issena Hotel in Seabreeze

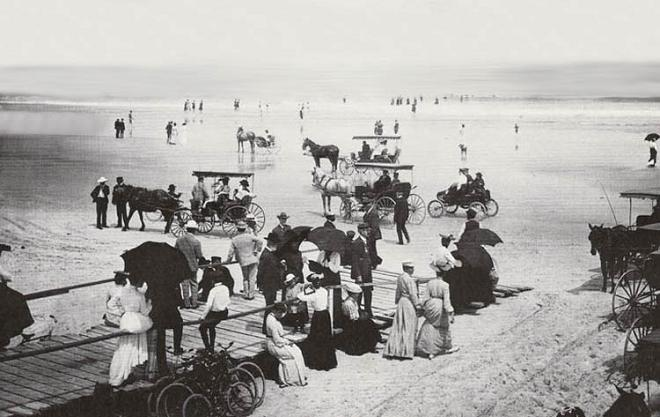
Carriages on the beach in Seabreeze, FL, 1906

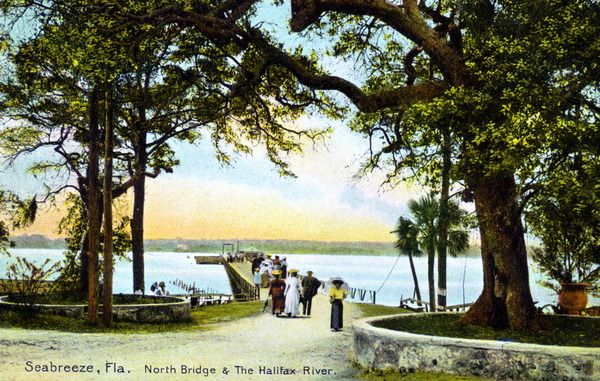
The first Seabreeze Bridge across the Halifax River
