= The Chiles Academy =

- Cypress Street Elementary School
- U.S. National Register of Historic Places
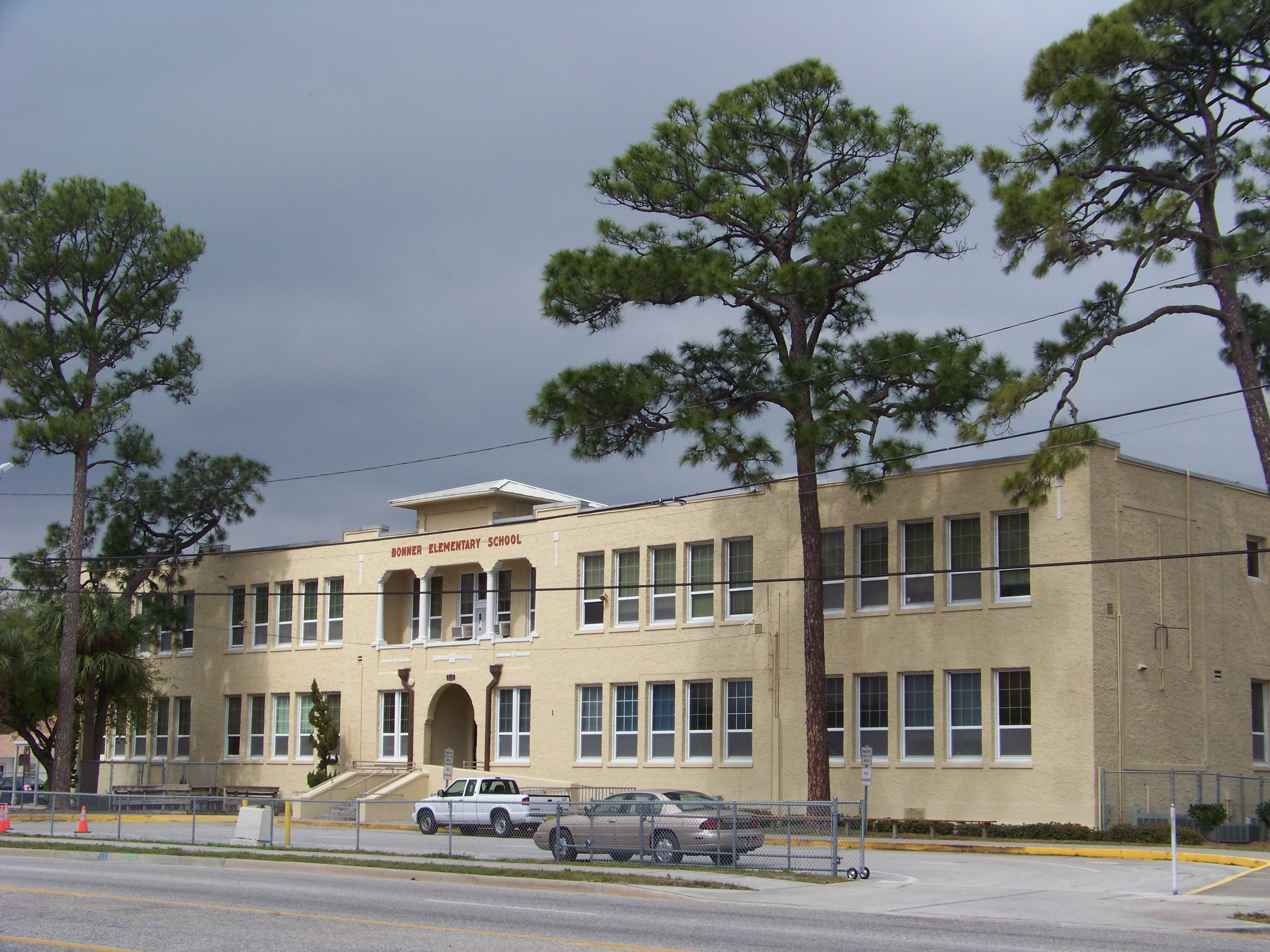

- Location within Volusia County
- Location: 868 George W. Engram Blvd. Daytona Beach, Florida
- Coordinates: 29.2132°N 81.0396°W
- Built: 1926
- MPS: Daytona Beach Multiple Property Submission
- NRHP reference No.: 96001333
- Added to NRHP: December 2, 1996

The Chiles Academy is a public charter school located in Daytona Beach, Florida, United States. It is part of the Volusia County Schools district.

The school was originally built in 1926 as the Cypress Street Elementary School. Initially, the school consisted of a two-story block and stucco building with two brick wings. The school's name was changed in 1954 to Bonner Elementary School to honor its first and longest-serving principal, Evelyn Bonner, who headed the school from 1927 to 1959. Before her tenure at Cypress Street Elementary, Ms. Bonner taught at Campbell Elementary for 16 years. Bonner Elementary School was one of several Volusia County schools closed in 2008. The building currently houses Chiles Academy, a charter high school for teen parents and their children.

On December 2, 1996, the school was added to the U.S. National Register of Historic Places. The property is part of the Daytona Beach Multiple Property Submission, a Multiple Property Submission to the National Register.
