= Daytona Stadium =

American sports stadium

Coordinates: 29°10′23″N 81°7′3″W

- Larry Kelly Field

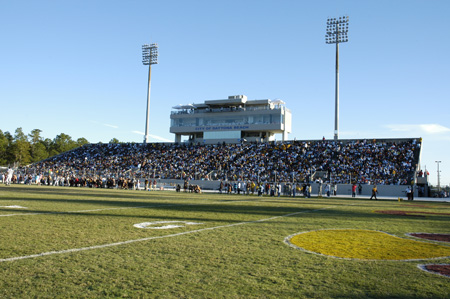
- A Bethune–Cookman Wildcats football game at the stadium in 2007
- Interactive map of Daytona Stadium
- Former names: Municipal Stadium (1988–2018)
- Location: 3777 LPGA Boulevard; Daytona Beach, Florida 32114
- Owner: City of Daytona Beach
- Operator: City of Daytona Beach
- Capacity: 10,000
- Surface: Artificial turf (since 2010)

Construction
- Groundbreaking: 1987
- Opened: September 2, 1988
- Renovated: 2018
- Cost: $6 million ($16.3 million in 2025)

Tenants
- Bethune–Cookman Wildcats (NCAA) (1988–present); Mainland High School & Seabreeze High School football (1988–present); Daytona Beach Racers (SFL) (2011); NAIA Football National Championship (2014–2018); Tropical Bowl (NCAA) (2017–2019, 2024); Daytona Rush SC (USL2) (2019); Club de Lyon (NISA) (2023)

Daytona Stadium, originally known as Municipal Stadium, is a 10,000-seat stadium in Daytona Beach, Florida, that opened in 1988. The stadium is home to the Bethune–Cookman University Wildcats football team, which competes in NCAA Division I Football Championship Subdivision (FCS). It is also used to host home games for the Mainland High School and Seabreeze High School football teams. The gridiron is known as Larry Kelly Field, a name honoring Lawrence J. Kelly, a former mayor of Daytona Beach.

== History ==
The stadium opened as Municipal Stadium in 1988, funded partially by the City of Daytona Beach (from the sale of another stadium) and a donation from Daytona International Speedway, located about 3 miles (4.8 km) to the east. In 1994, the playing field was named after Larry Kelly, who served as mayor of Daytona Beach from 1974 to 1993. Originally with a natural grass surface, artificial turf was installed in 2010 and updated in 2017.

Until the end of the 2009 Bike Week season, the stadium hosted the AMA Flat Track motorcycle championships during Daytona Beach Bike Week. When the city removed the track as part of changes to the stadium, those races moved to a new dirt track at Daytona International Speedway.

In 2008 and 2009, the stadium was the location of the Florida Football Alliance annual "Alliance Bowl" season-championship game. It was held in Jacksonville for the 2010 season while the stadium underwent surface replacement. The Alliance Bowl returned in 2011.

From 2014 through 2018, the stadium hosted the NAIA Football National Championship game.

In 2018, DME Academy, a private sports training academy based in Daytona Beach, signed a 30-year lease for the stadium, changed its name from Municipal Stadium to Daytona Stadium, and undertook a $20 million renovation project. However, as of January 2024, Daytona Stadium is absent from the DME Academy website.

The stadium has hosted several playings of the Tropical Bowl, a postseason college football all-star game, in January 2017, 2018, 2019, and 2024.

The stadium hosted a United Football League (UFL) playoff game between the DC Defenders and Orlando Storm on June 7, 2026, due to a scheduling conflict at the Storm's stadium, Inter&Co Stadium.

== See also ==
- List of NCAA Division I FCS football stadiums
