= Seybold Baking Company Factory =

Defunct baking factory

- U.S. National Register of Historic Places
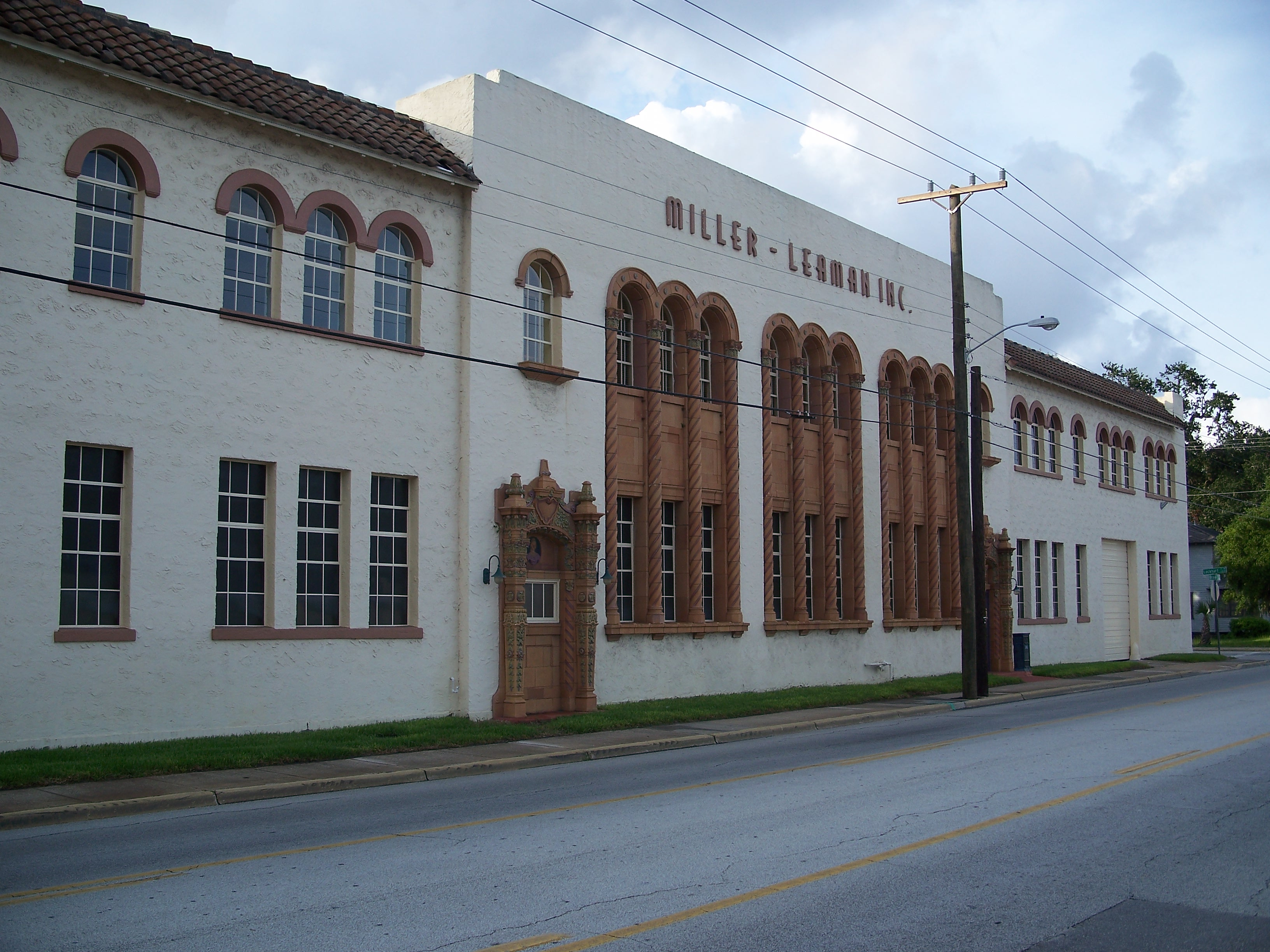

- Location within Florida Location within the United States
- Location: 800 Orange Ave., Daytona Beach, Florida
- Coordinates: 29°12′9″N 81°1′55″W
- Area: 1 acre (0.40 ha)
- Built: 1927
- Built by: Equity Construction Co.
- Architect: Hodkins, Edwin J.
- Architectural style: Mediterranean Revival
- MPS: Daytona Beach MPS
- NRHP reference No.: 97001283
- Added to NRHP: October 30, 1997

The Seybold Baking Company Factory, also known as Columbia Baking Company or Southern Bakeries Factory, is a historic building at 800 Orange Avenue in Daytona Beach. It was added to the National Register of Historic Places on October 30, 1997. The property is part of the Daytona Beach Multiple Property Submission.

The Seybold Baking Company was founded in Miami by John Seybold.

== See also ==
- National Register of Historic Places listings in Volusia County, Florida
