= Daytona Beach Multiple Property Submission =

- U.S. National Register of Historic Places
- Location within Florida Location within the United States
- Location: Daytona Beach, Florida
- Coordinates: 29°12′N 81°02′W
- NRHP reference No.: 64500100

The following buildings were added to the National Register of Historic Places as part of the Daytona Beach Multiple Property Submission (or MPS).

Resource Name	Also known as	Image	Address	Added
Bethune–Cookman College Historic District			620 Drive Mary McLeod Bethune Boulevard	March 21, 1996
City Island Ball Park	Jackie Robinson Ball Park		City Island, across from the Daytona Beach Business District	October 22, 1998
Cypress Street Elementary School	Bonner Elementary School		900 Cypress Street	December 2, 1996
Daytona Beach Bandshell and Oceanfront Park Complex			Ocean Avenue, north of the junction of Main Street and Atlantic	March 5, 1999
Daytona Beach Surfside Historic District			roughly bounded by Auditorium Boulevard, the Atlantic Ocean, US 92, and the Halifax River	August 1, 1996
Seabreeze Historic District			roughly bounded by University Boulevard, Halifax Road, Auditorium Boulevard, and North Atlantic Avenue	September 3, 1998
Seybold Baking Company Factory	Columbia Baking Company or Southern Bakeries Factory		800 Orange Avenue	October 30, 1997
South Beach Street Historic District			Roughly bounded by Volusia Ave. (Int'l Speedway Blvd), South Beach St., South St., and US 1 (Ridgewood Ave.)	1998
South Peninsula Historic District			roughly the Daytona Beach Peninsula between the Atlantic Ocean and Halifax Road	November 19, 1998
Southwest Daytona Beach Black Heritage District	Martin Luther King, Jr. Boulevard Historic District		roughly bounded by Foote Court, South Street, Martin Luther King Boulevard, and the FEC RR tracks	May 23, 1997
