= Miller House (Madison, Wisconsin) =

Historic house in Wisconsin, United States

- U.S. National Register of Historic Places
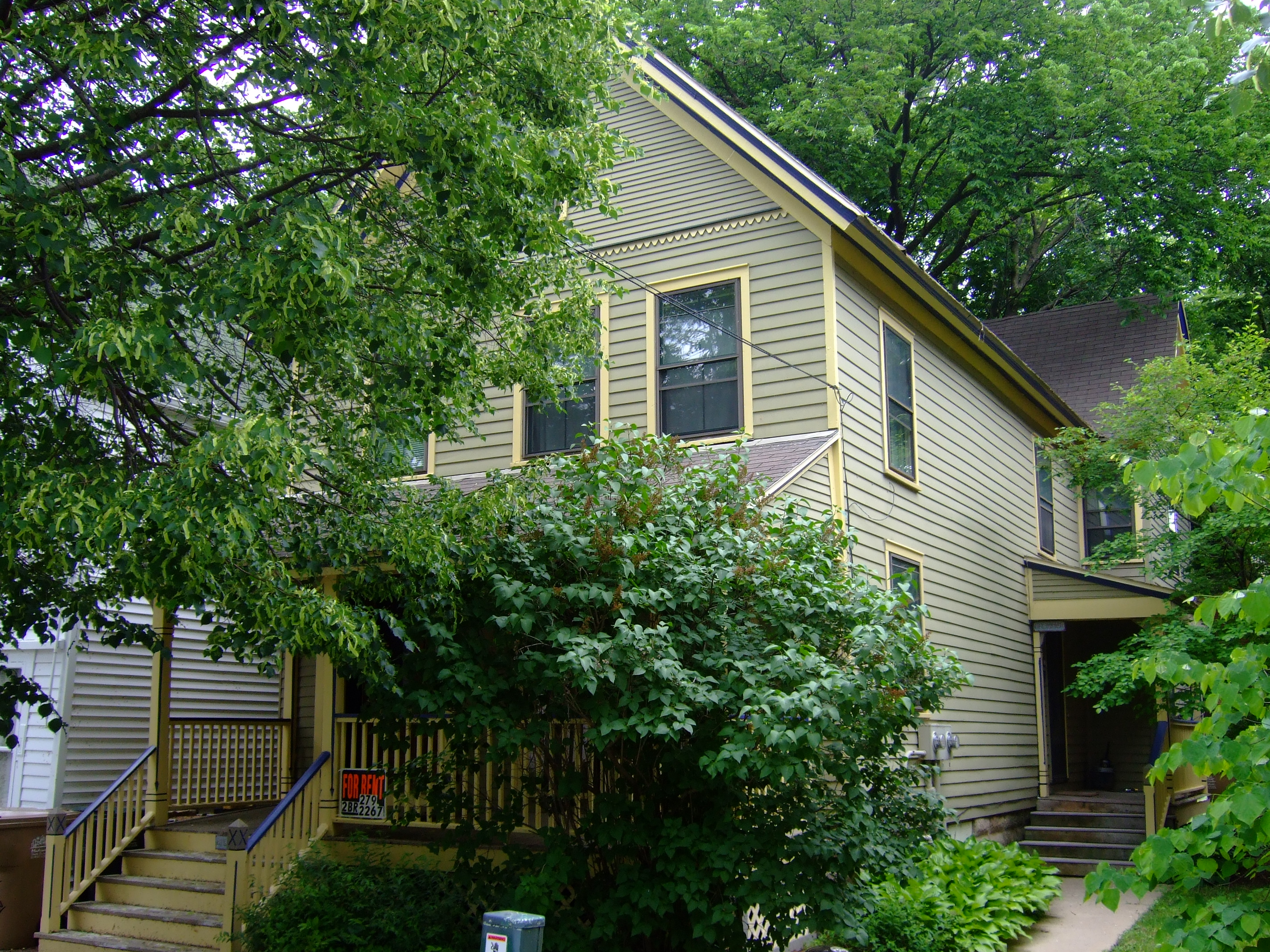
- The Miller House, June 2009

- Location within Wisconsin Location within the United States
- Interactive map showing the location for Miller House
- Location: 647 E. Dayton St., Madison, Wisconsin
- Coordinates: 43°04′51″N 89°22′44″W
- Area: 0.1 acres (0.040 ha)
- Built: 1853
- Architectural style: Greek Revival, Italianate
- Part of: East Dayton Street Historic District
- NRHP reference No.: 79000339
- Added to NRHP: November 8, 1979

The Miller House is a historic house at 647 E. Dayton Street in Madison, Wisconsin. The house was moved to its current location in 1908 by William and Anna Mae Miller, a Black couple who ran a rooming house in the building and later lived there with their family. It is the oldest surviving Black-owned building in Madison. The house is listed on the National Register of Historic Places.

== Description ==
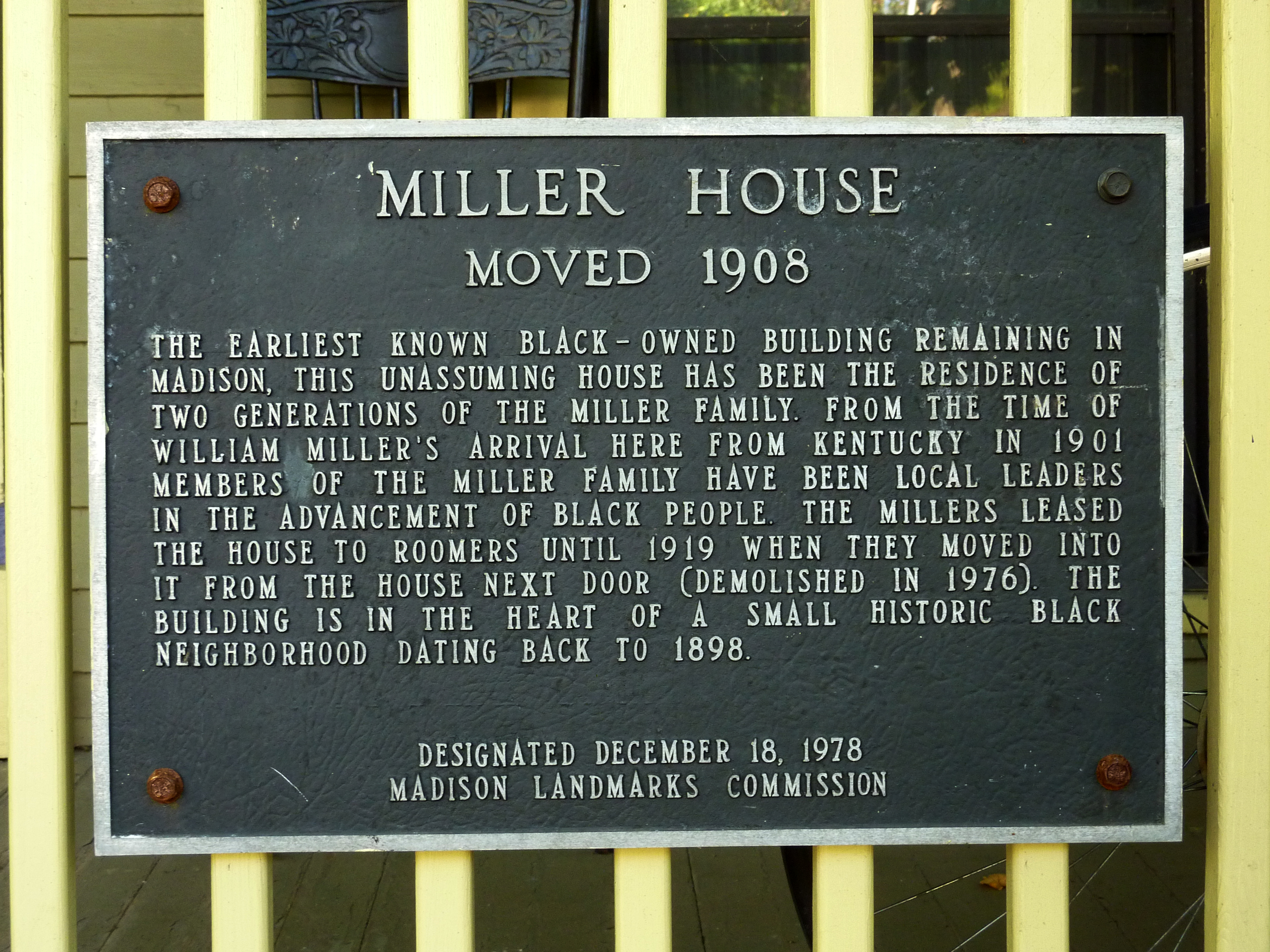
Miller House historical plaque, September 2012

The Miller House is located at 647 East Dayton Street within the East Dayton Street Historic District. It is a two-story building with Greek Revival and Italianate influences. Part of the original house was removed when it was relocated to Dayton Street, and the back of the house may have once been a separate building. The house's design includes a front porch with a double entrance, floor-to-ceiling windows, and a wooden staircase and fireplace mantel. Asbestos siding was added to the exterior in the mid-twentieth century. Developer Randall Alexander renovated the house in 1986 by removing the new siding, rebuilding the original porches, and conducting additional maintenance on the dilapidated structure.

== History ==
The house was originally built in 1853 at a corner spot on Pinckney and Johnson Streets in Madison. It was moved to its current location in 1908 by William Miller, an aide to U.S. Senator Robert M. La Follette, and his wife Anna Mae. The Millers helped establish a small Black neighborhood on East Dayton Street in the 1900s, one of the first in Madison. William cofounded an African Methodist Episcopal church on Dayton Street in 1902, was the Wisconsin contact for the NAACP, and was a member of the Niagara Movement. Anna Mae established a Black literary club in Madison in 1909 and went on to be a founding member of Madison's chapter of the NAACP. The Miller family initially used the house at 647 East Dayton as a rooming house for Black migrants to Madison; it was one of three houses owned by the family on East Dayton and the only one which is still standing. The family moved into the house in 1919; while William died the following year, Anna Mae lived in the house until her death in 1963, and their daughter Lucile kept the house in the family until 1978.

The house was listed on the National Register of Historic Places on November 8, 1979, and on the State Register of Historic Places in 1989.

== See also ==
- National Register of Historic Places listings in Madison, Wisconsin
