= Daytona Beach Boardwalk =

Coordinates: 29.22787°N 81.00774°W

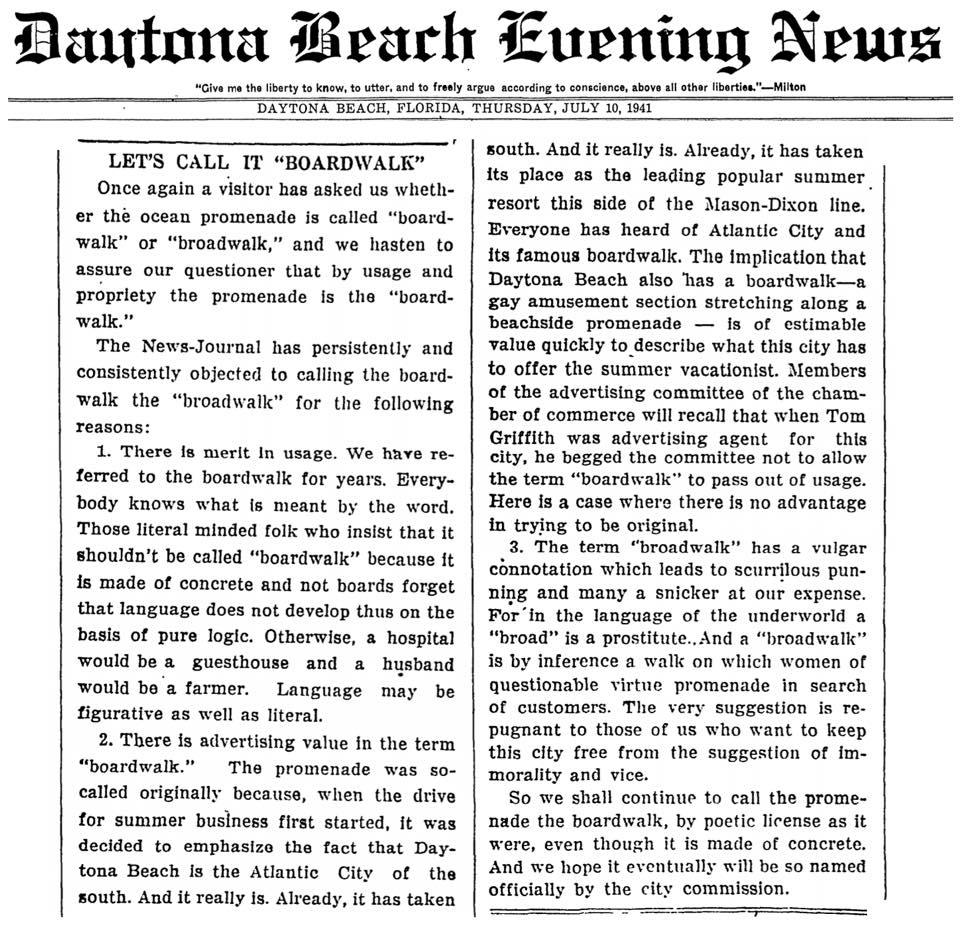

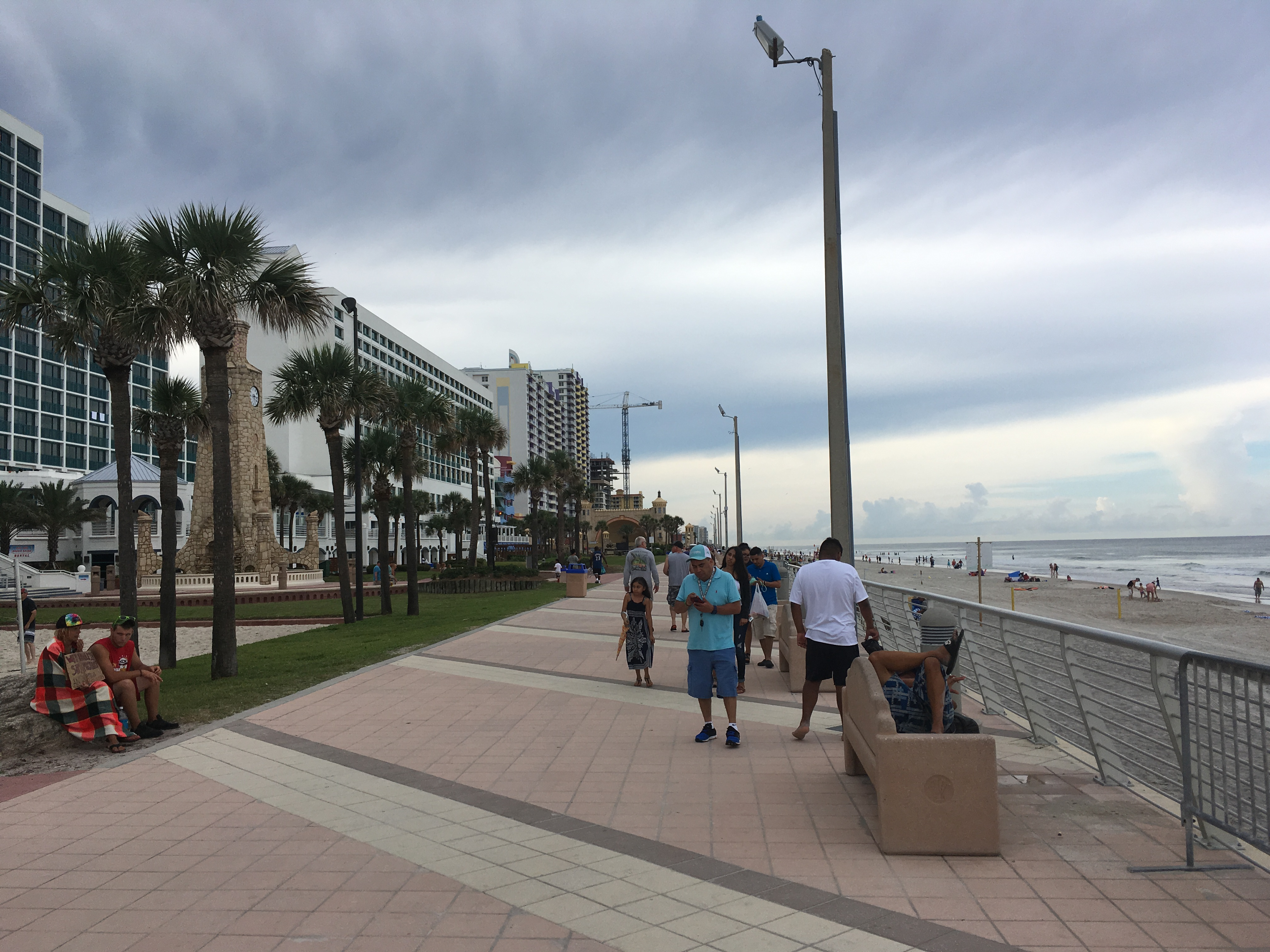
The Daytona Beach Boardwalk looking north

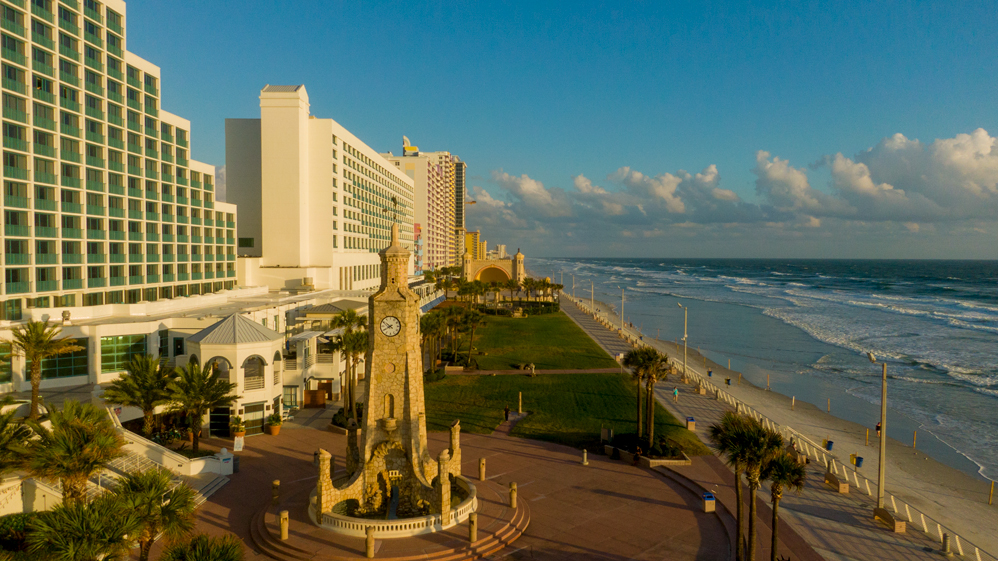
Daytona Beach Boardwalk aerial photo looking north

The Daytona Beach Boardwalk consists of the concrete promenade which was installed in the late 1920s, followed by the bandshell and coquina embellishments which were completed in 1938. It is a structure located on the beach in Daytona Beach, Florida at the east end of Main Street, east of Atlantic Avenue. It is open seven days a week and consists of a concrete walkway with various stores and shops including the City Walk shopping and entertainment complex, hotels, gift shops, amusement centers, arcades, restaurants and bars. It also features outdoor and indoor rides like the Ferris wheel, Slingshot, Hurricane, Tilt-O-Whirl, go-carts and formerly a roller coaster called the Sand Blaster. Free concerts are given in the summer at the Bandshell on the north end of the area. The Daytona Beach Pier, also known as the Main Street Pier, was built by Thomas Keating in the late 1800s. The pier begins at the east end of Main Street, south of the boardwalk and extends 1,000 feet into the Atlantic Ocean.

At its conception the Boardwalk was originally called "the Broadwalk" as it was a broad stretch of cement, and not boards. Many references can be found referring to the attraction as Broadwalk. The common name became the Boardwalk after the editor of the local newspaper committed to calling it that in the newspaper, and it caught on. The editor was concerned with the advertising value of the term Boardwalk over Broadwalk (as Daytona at that time was looking to market as the Atlantic City of the South), as well as the "vulgar connotation" of using the term "broad" in relation to women who may be walking there.

An article appeared in the Daytona Beach News Journal on May 21, 2015, stating that Volusia County is looking into possibly expanding the boardwalk.

On June 14, 2018, two riders fell 34 feet and six people were injured after the Sand Blaster roller coaster derailed. The cause of the derailment was determined to be an excessively high speed, and the coaster was torn down from the park at the order of the Florida Department of Agriculture and Consumer Services in 2019.
