= Dayton, Indiana =

- Town
- Location of Dayton in Tippecanoe County, Indiana.
- Coordinates: 40°22′28″N 86°46′18″W
- Country: United States
- State: Indiana
- County: Tippecanoe
- Township: Sheffield
- Founded: 1827

Government
  - Type: Incorporated town

Area
  - Total: 1.14 sq mi (2.96 km^{2})
  - Land: 1.14 sq mi (2.96 km^{2})
  - Water: 0 sq mi (0.00 km^{2})
- Elevation: 673 ft (205 m)

Population (2020)
  - Total: 1,330
  - Density: 1,163.6/sq mi (449.26/km^{2})
- Time zone: UTC-5 (Eastern (EST))
  - Summer (DST): UTC-4 (EDT)
- ZIP code: 47941
- Area code: 765
- FIPS code: 18-17002
- GNIS feature ID: 2396681
- Website: dayton.in.gov

Dayton is a town in Sheffield Township, Tippecanoe County, in the U.S. state of Indiana. As of the 2020 census, Dayton had a population of 1,330.

It is part of the Lafayette, Indiana Metropolitan Statistical Area.

== History ==
Dayton was known as Fairfield until 1830. The post office at Dayton has been in operation since 1831.

Dayton Historic District was listed on the National Register of Historic Places in 2003.

== Geography ==
Dayton is located in northwest Sheffield Township, at an elevation of 676 feet (206 m).

According to the 2010 census, Dayton has a total area of 1.06 square miles (2.75 km^{2}), all land.

== Demographics ==
Historical population
Census	Pop.	Note	%±
1870	385		—
1880	376		−2.3%
1980	781		—
1990	996		27.5%
2000	1,120		12.4%
2010	1,420		26.8%
2020	1,330		−6.3%
U.S. Decennial Census

=== 2020 census ===
As of the 2020 census, Dayton had a population of 1,330. The median age was 35.4 years. 25.1% of residents were under the age of 18 and 15.6% of residents were 65 years of age or older. For every 100 females there were 92.8 males, and for every 100 females age 18 and over there were 91.5 males age 18 and over.

98.4% of residents lived in urban areas, while 1.6% lived in rural areas.

There were 533 households in Dayton, of which 37.1% had children under the age of 18 living in them. Of all households, 48.4% were married-couple households, 18.9% were households with a male householder and no spouse or partner present, and 24.6% were households with a female householder and no spouse or partner present. About 24.0% of all households were made up of individuals and 9.8% had someone living alone who was 65 years of age or older.

There were 553 housing units, of which 3.6% were vacant. The homeowner vacancy rate was 2.6% and the rental vacancy rate was 1.3%.

Racial composition as of the 2020 census
Race	Number	Percent
White	1,166	87.7%
Black or African American	12	0.9%
American Indian and Alaska Native	3	0.2%
Asian	1	0.1%
Native Hawaiian and Other Pacific Islander	0	0.0%
Some other race	37	2.8%
Two or more races	111	8.3%
Hispanic or Latino (of any race)	117	8.8%

=== 2010 census ===
As of the census of 2010, there were 1,420 people, 536 households, and 398 families living in the town. The population density was 1,339.6 inhabitants per square mile (517.2/km^{2}). There were 565 housing units at an average density of 533.0 per square mile (205.8/km^{2}). The racial makeup of the town was 95.4% White, 0.9% African American, 0.6% Native American, 0.2% Asian, 1.1% from other races, and 1.8% from two or more races. Hispanic or Latino of any race were 3.6% of the population.

There were 536 households, of which 41.8% had children under the age of 18 living with them, 52.1% were married couples living together, 13.6% had a female householder with no husband present, 8.6% had a male householder with no wife present, and 25.7% were non-families. 20.3% of all households were made up of individuals, and 4.1% had someone living alone who was 65 years of age or older. The average household size was 2.65 and the average family size was 3.03.

The median age in the town was 32 years. 29.2% of residents were under the age of 18; 8% were between the ages of 18 and 24; 32.3% were from 25 to 44; 22.5% were from 45 to 64; and 8.1% were 65 years of age or older. The gender makeup of the town was 49.7% male and 50.3% female.

=== 2000 census ===
As of the census of 2000, there were 1,120 people, 401 households, and 313 families living in the town. The population density was 1,079.2 inhabitants per square mile (416.7/km^{2}). There were 430 housing units at an average density of 414.4 per square mile (160.0/km^{2}). The racial makeup of the town was 79.23% White, 18.18% African American, 0.27% Native American, 0.98% from other races, and 1.34% from two or more races. Hispanic or Latino of any race were 2.05% of the population.

There were 401 households, out of which 49.1% had children under the age of 18 living with them, 59.4% were married couples living together, 14.7% had a female householder with no husband present, and 21.9% were non-families. 18.2% of all households were made up of individuals, and 7.0% had someone living alone who was 65 years of age or older. The average household size was 2.79 and the average family size was 3.15.

In the town, the population was spread out, with 33.4% under the age of 18, 7.9% from 18 to 24, 33.8% from 25 to 44, 16.3% from 45 to 64, and 8.7% who were 65 years of age or older. The median age was 30 years. For every 100 females, there were 95.5 males. For every 100 females age 18 and over, there were 91.3 males.

The median income for a household in the town was $44,792, and the median income for a family was $48,021. Males had a median income of $42,813 versus $25,950 for females. The per capita income for the town was $17,401. About 10.0% of families and 7.9% of the population were below the poverty line, including 8.3% of those under age 18 and 12.2% of those age 65 or over.

== Education ==
It is in the Tippecanoe School Corporation. Residents are zoned to Dayton Elementary School, Wainwright Middle School, and McCutcheon High School.

== Trivia ==
- Shannon Hoon of the band Blind Melon was born and raised in the area around Dayton and is buried in Dayton Cemetery on the east edge of town.
- Dayton is the subject of a Lefty Hazmat song of the same name.

== Gallery ==
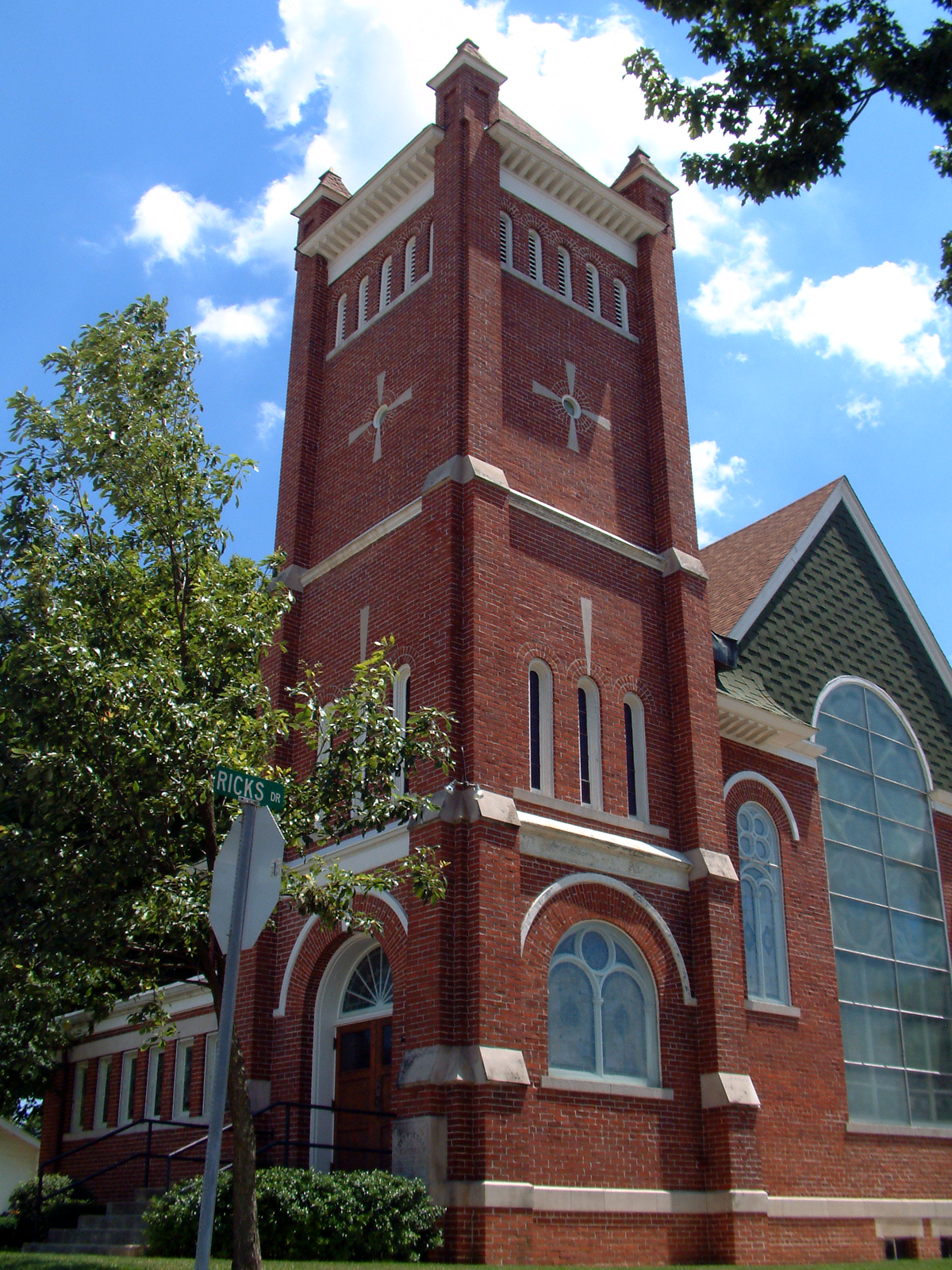
Memorial Presbyterian Church on Walnut St.

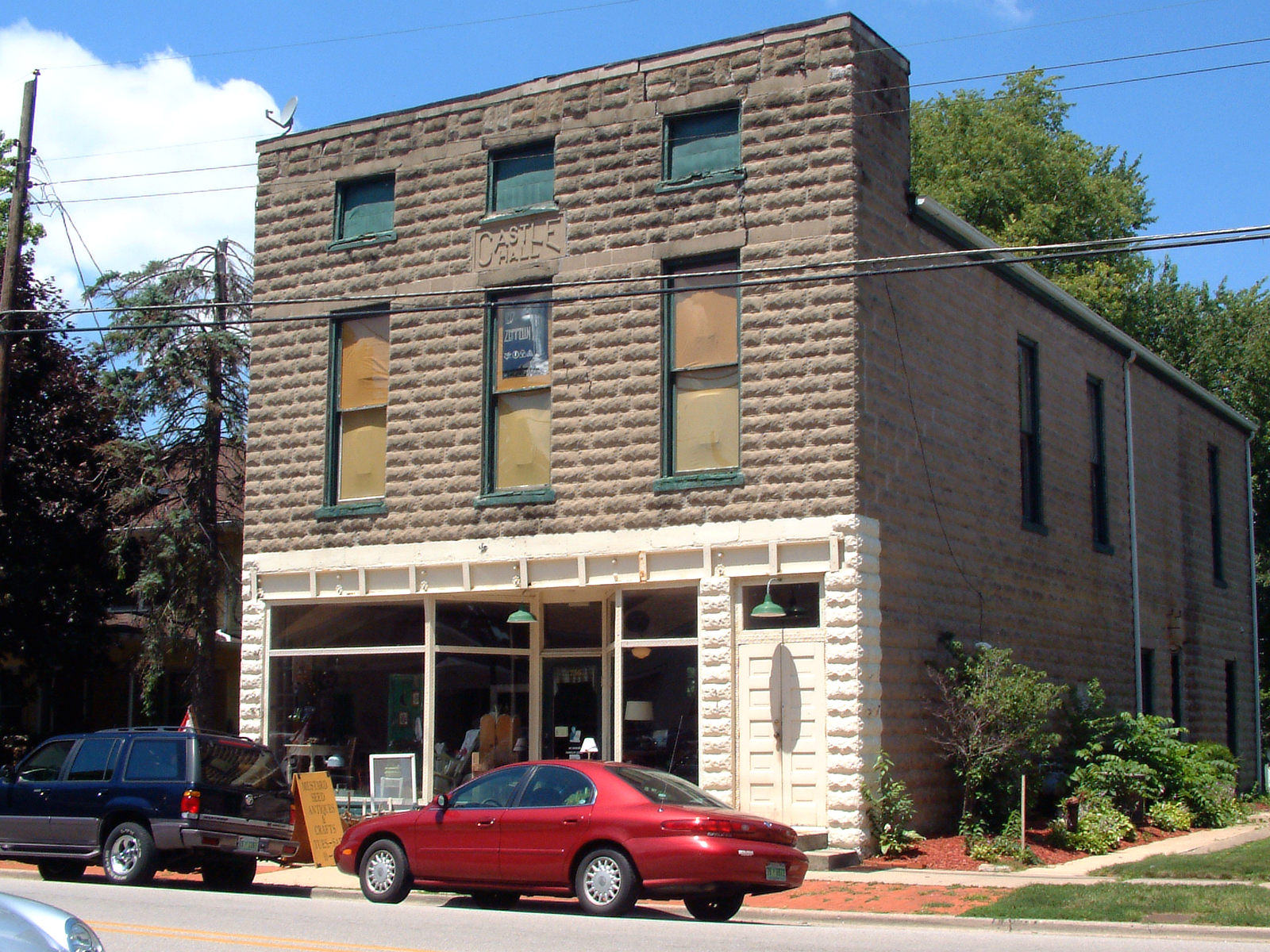
Dayton's historic district is listed on the NRHP

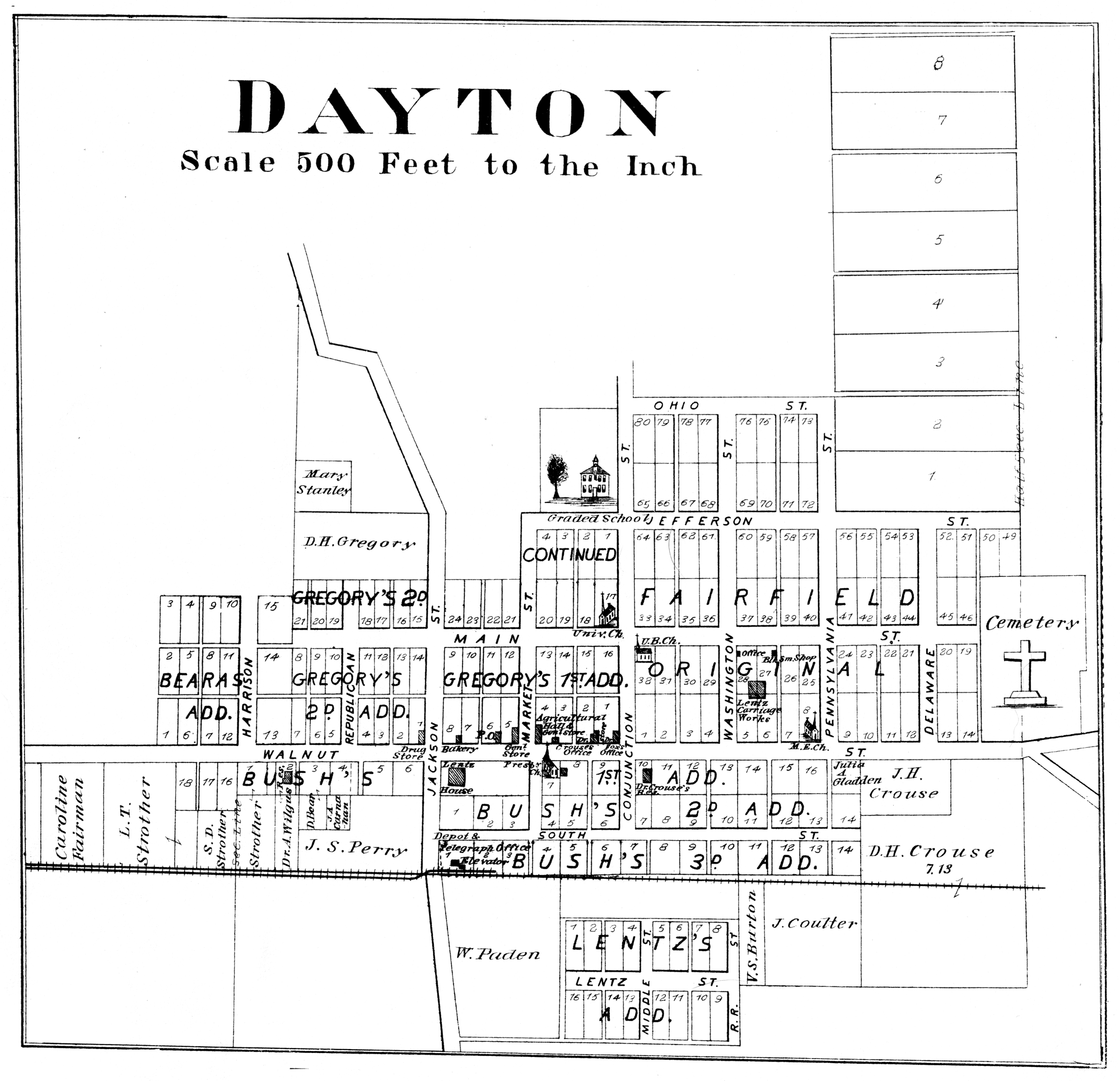
Map of Dayton, 1878
