= Spring break =

Recess in early spring at universities and schools

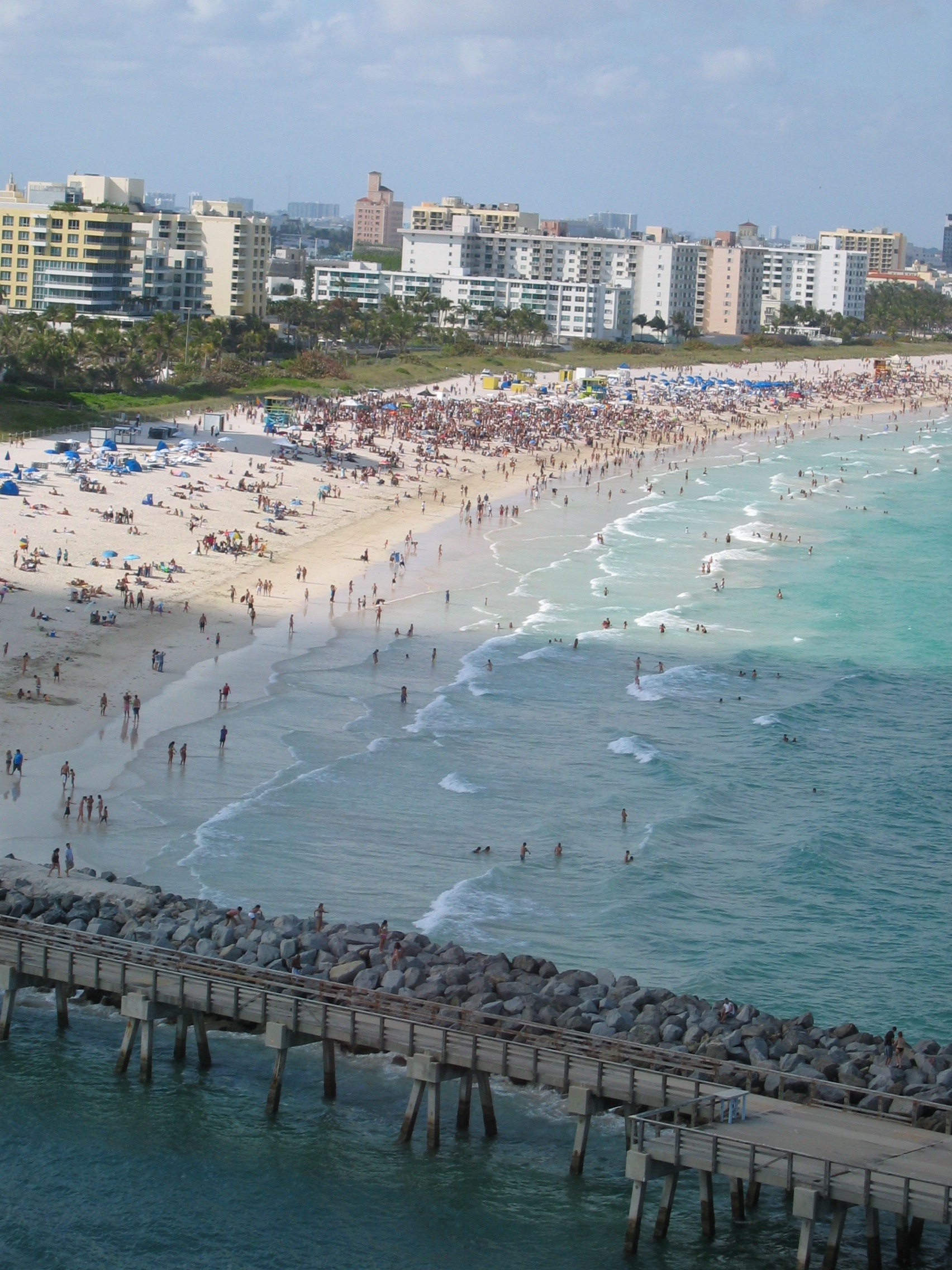
Miami Beach, Florida, during spring break in 2010

Spring break is an American cultural event generally experienced as a one-to-two-week academic vacation period observed by schools and universities across the United States, usually in March or April. While providing a general recess for all students, it has become particularly associated with college students traveling to warm-weather destinations. This tradition, largely popularized by mid-20th-century films and media coverage, is known for its focus on large parties and social gatherings.

According to Bustle, college students in the US have "almost always" had time off in the early spring. The tradition of spring break vacations, however, began with Florida as a vacation destination, and was spread by popular books and films before expanding to more destinations.

In the mid-1930s, a swimming coach from Colgate University decided to take his team down to Florida for some early training at a brand-new Olympic-size pool in sunny Fort Lauderdale. The idea clicked with other college swim coaches, and soon the spring training migration became an annual tradition for swimmers nationwide. Now, spring break is an academic tradition in various mostly western countries that is scheduled for different periods depending on the state and sometimes the region.

In the United States, spring break at universities, colleges, and many K–12 school systems can take place from March to April, depending on term dates and when Easter holiday falls. Spring break is usually a week or two long, although some schools schedule it for mid to late March, with separate days off for the Easter holiday.

== Popular destinations ==
=== United States ===
In the US, many people take the holiday off. The holiday is celebrated near Easter, and many families hold easter egg hunts, or celebrate with Easter activities.

==== Panama City Beach, Florida ====
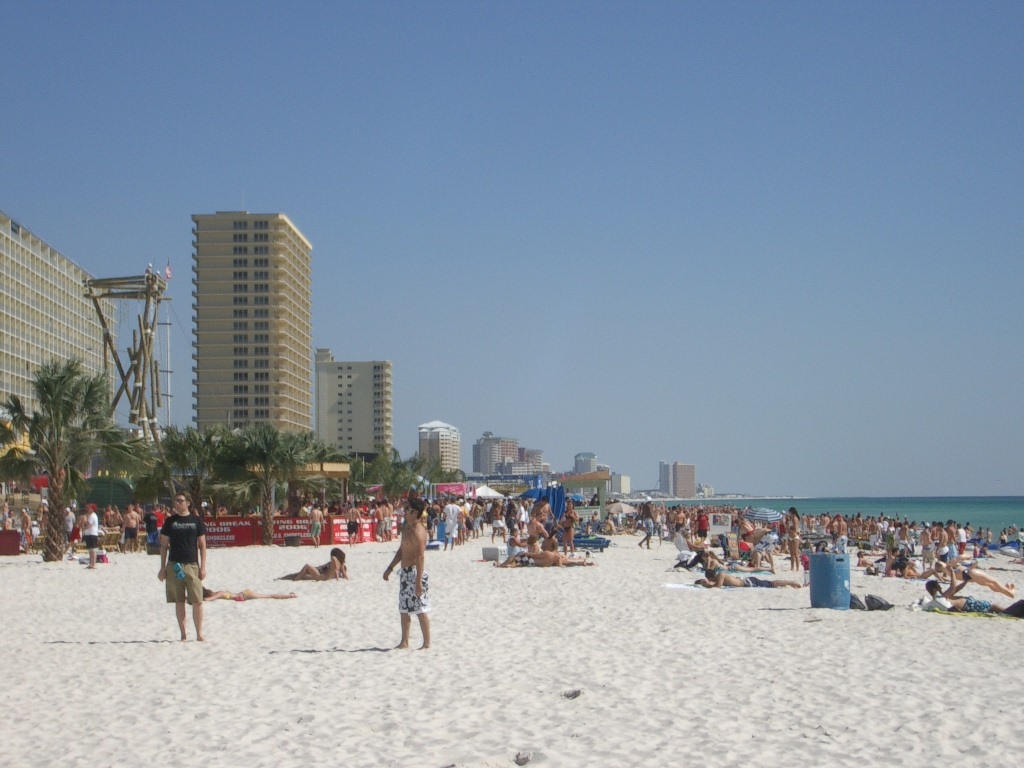
Panama City Beach, Florida, during spring break in 2006

Starting in the late 1990s, Panama City Beach began advertising the destination hoping to attract crowds that had formerly gone to Fort Lauderdale and then Daytona Beach before those communities enacted restrictions. From 2010 to 2016, an estimated 300,000 students traveled to the destination. The spawn of social media and digital marketing helped boost the beach town into a student mecca during March. Following well-publicized shootings and a gang rape in 2015, several new ordinances were put into effect prohibiting drinking on the beach and establishing a bar closing time of 2 a.m. CT. Reports showed a drop in Panama City Beach's spring break turnout in March 2016, followed by increased family tourism in April 2016. Both are attributed to the new ordinances by the Bay County Community Development Corporation (CDC).

==== Daytona Beach, Florida ====
After Fort Lauderdale started discouraging college students from vacationing there for spring break in the mid-1980s, Daytona Beach mayor Larry Kelly appeared on national television to encourage college vacationers to come to Daytona Beach instead. Soon after, beer and cigarette brands started advertising in Daytona Beach for spring break. MTV Spring Break coverage moved to Daytona Beach in 1986.

Kelly later called that decision a mistake, as locals experienced many problems during spring break every year. Kelly's efforts to rein in the revelry included promoting athletic competitions called "Spring Games" to channel youthful energy in a wholesome direction, and proposing that hotels be billed for the cost of sending police to respond to calls during spring break. In 1993, Kelly lost his bid for re-election as mayor, and Daytona Beach officials cut their spring break marketing budget and ties with MTV.

==== Fort Lauderdale, Florida ====
Fort Lauderdale's reputation as a spring break destination for college students started when the Colgate University men's swim team arrived to practice there over Christmas break in 1934. Attracting approximately 20,000 college students in the 1950s, spring break was still known as 'Spring vacation' and was a relatively low key affair. This began to change when Glendon Swarthout's novel, Where the Boys Are was published in 1960, effectively ushering in modern spring break. Swarthout's 1960 novel was quickly made into a movie of the same title later that year, Where the Boys Are, in which college girls met boys while on spring break there. The number of visiting college students immediately jumped to over 50,000. The 1965 film Girl Happy starring Elvis Presley also depicts spring break, mentioning many universities and Fort Lauderdale by name (many times).

By the early 1980s, Fort Lauderdale was attracting between 250,000 and 350,000 college students per year during spring break. Residents of the Fort Lauderdale area became so upset at the damage done by college students that the local government passed laws restricting parties in 1985. At the same time, the National Minimum Drinking Age Act was enacted in the United States, requiring that Florida raise the minimum drinking age from 18 to 21 and inspiring many underage college vacationers to travel to other competing locations in the United States for spring break. By 1989, the number of college students traveling to Fort Lauderdale fell to 20,000, a far cry from the 350,000 who went four years prior.

==== South Padre Island, Texas ====
In the early 1980s, South Padre Island became the first location outside of Florida to draw a large number of college students for spring break. With only a few thousand residents, South Padre Island consistently drew 80,000 to 120,000 spring breakers into the 2000s.

==== Disneyland (CA) or Disney World (FL) ====
Spring break is one of the busiest times of year to visit these theme parks, featuring peak crowd levels throughout March and April due to the staggered timing of breaks across the US.

=== Caribbean ===
- Montego Bay, Jamaica
- Nassau, Bahamas
- Punta Cana, Dominican Republic

=== Mexico ===
- Acapulco
- Cancún (Hotel Zone)
- Cabo San Lucas

== See also ==
- Girls Gone Wild (franchise)
- Schoolies week
- Senior Week
- Wet T-shirt contest
