= MTV Spring Break =

- Genre: Comedy; Game show; Music; Reality television
- Developed by: Doug Herzog
- Written by: Tommy Cody; Steve Freeman; Dave Polsky; Steve Sussman
- Directed by: Joe DeMaio; Steve Paley; Liz Patrick
- Starring: MTV VJs
- Composer: Jon Ernst
- Country of origin: United States
- Original language: English
- No. of seasons: 28

Production
- Executive producer: Nancy McDonald
- Producers: Jacqueline Bender; Mark Cronin; Kallissa Miller; Matthew Parillo; Sitarah Pendelton; Sharon Sussman; Bryan Terry; Burt Wheeler
- Production locations: Acapulco, Mexico; Cancun, Mexico; Daytona Beach, Florida; Lake Havasu, Arizona; Miami, Florida; Mission Beach, San Diego; Panama City, Florida; Paradise, Nevada; South Padre Island, Texas; Sunny Isles Beach, Florida
- Editor: Juan Pichardo
- Camera setup: Multi-camera
- Production company: MTV Productions

Original release
- Network: MTV (1986–2005); MTVU (2006–2014)
- Release: March 24, 1986 – March 25, 2014

Related
- My Super Sweet 21; Spring Break Challenge; Viva La Spring Break

MTV Spring Break refers to the channel's defunct annual spring break coverage, featuring numerous live performances from artists and bands on location. The annual tradition continued into the 2000s, when it became de-emphasized and handed off to mtvU, the spin-off channel of MTV targeted at college campuses.

== Background ==
MTV began its annual Spring break coverage in 1986, setting up temporary operations in Daytona Beach, Florida, for a week in March, broadcasting live eight hours per day. "Spring break is a youth culture event", MTV's vice president Doug Herzog said at the time. "We wanted to be part of it for that reason. It makes good sense for us to come down and go live from the center of it, because obviously the people there are the kinds of people who watch MTV."

After Fort Lauderdale started discouraging college students from vacationing there for Spring break in the mid-1980s, Daytona Beach, Florida mayor Larry Kelly appeared on national television to encourage college vacationers to come to Daytona Beach for Spring break instead. Soon after, beer and cigarette brands started advertising in Daytona Beach for Spring break. He later called that decision a mistake as locals experienced many problems during Spring break every year. Kelly's efforts to rein in the revelry included promoting athletic competitions called "Spring Games" to channel youthful energy in a wholesome direction, and proposing that hotels be billed for the cost of sending police to respond to calls during Spring break. Soon after he lost his election bid in 1993, Daytona cut ties with MTV.

Birthday parties included a My Super Sweet 21, which was broadcast during MTV's Spring break party. Meanwhile, Ron Norsworthy served as a visual artist and designer for MTV Spring Break 2004 and MTV Spring Break 2005.

== Notable performances and locations ==
MTV Spring Break used to hold concerts at the Bandshell in Daytona. Mr. Mister performed at the first MTV Spring Break show in 1986 as did Craig Chaquico and Starship. In 1987, Crowded House played there for Spring break.

Shock G and the rest of Digital Underground's TV appearances include MTV Spring Break 1990 in Daytona Beach. Also in 1990, Chad Smith and Flea of the Red Hot Chili Peppers were arrested after filming an MTV Spring Break performance. They sexually harassed a 20-year-old woman during their show, after Flea walked into the crowd and carried her away.

In 1992, Primus performed hit singles "Jerry Was A Race Car Driver" and "Tommy the Cat"

In 1993, Joey Lawrence was invited to perform "Nothin' My Love Can't Fix" on MTV Spring Break. Also in 1993, DJ Rectangle won the US DMC Championship and the International DJ Search, sponsored by The Box Television, to become the official DJ for Def Jam recording artist Warren G. He then toured with Warren G on his Regulate tour, and continued to appear on various television shows including MTV Spring Break. Meanwhile, DJ Head's television appearances include MTV Spring Break with Eminem, Xzibit, and Dr. Dre. Another DJ for MTV Spring Break was Dave Mays.

Because of its popularity during spring break, Club La Vela in Panama City Beach, Florida has been the focus of numerous media reports and events. MTV has made the club its home during numerous spring breaks over the past decade. The club is known for its bikini and wet T-shirt contests for women and "hard body" contests for men.

In March 1997, Aaliyah made an appearance at MTV's annual spring break celebration in Panama City and during MTV Spring Break, Aaliyah performed "One in a Million".

Kid Rock's breakthrough hit single "Bawitdaba" was named by BuzzFeed as one of the top 50 most iconic MTV Spring Break performances.

Blink-182 played MTV Spring Break in Daytona Beach, Florida in 2000, a performance that still continues garner views on YouTube. The music video for their 2023 single "One More Time" features the band playing on stages and sets emulating a number of different settings from their past, including the stage from Spring Break 2000.

Comedian Jim Norton lost his place on the second season of Last Comic Standing in 2004 because of a contractual obligation to film pilot episodes for MTV which he had secured following the success of his One Night Stand special. The two pilots were Camp Cool, filed in Cancun for MTV Spring Break, also starring Al Shearer about helping men meet women, and Stupid Bets.

Bam Magera and his friends went to Miami in 2006 for "Viva La Spring Break", a two-part episode rarely seen since its original broadcast. Meanwhile, the version of Parental Control which aired February 2006, differs from its premiere on MTV's Spring Break 2005 in March. A girl was to interview five boys, and after a set of about five questions for each person or an activity of some sort, the father will eliminate one of the contestants. This continues until one contestant remained.

Kitchen 305 is a Sunny Isles Beach restaurant inside the Newport Beachside Resort, where MTV held its Spring Break 2008 party.

3OH!3 performed in Panama City Beach, Florida for MTVU's Spring Break in March 2009.

Lil Wayne had performed a televised concert for MTV Spring Break in Panama City Beach, Florida in March 2009.

Spring Break Challenge aired from March 22–26, 2010 in Acapulco, Mexico (prior to the airing of The Challenge's 19th season), during MTV's annual spring break coverage. This spin-off featured teams of college-aged friends in various challenges of old and new based on previous seasons of The Challenge. The Spring Break Challenge cast was made up of original contestants from colleges across the country, as well as alumni from previous seasons of The Real World, Road Rules, and the Fresh Meat challenge serving as coaches.

B.o.B and Bruno Mars made their debut performance of "Nothin' on You" at MTV Spring Break, on March 26, 2010.

The 2011 edition of MTV Spring Break was filmed at the Palms Casino Resort in Paradise, Nevada in March of that year and featured musical acts: Snoop Dogg, Pitbull, Lupe Fiasco, and Wiz Khalifa. Pitbull, Ne-Yo, and Nayer performed the song "Give Me Everything" at MTV's Spring Break 2011.

== Production and hosts ==
VJ Alan Hunter was known for his remotes and road trips in pioneering MTV programming, including MTV's Spring Break, MTV's Amuck in America, and MTV's Hedonism Weekend with Bon Jovi in Jamaica.

Bruce Gillmer got his start as a Talent Coordinator for MTV in 1987, working on shows like Yo! MTV Raps, Headbangers Ball, The Jon Stewart Show, and MTV Spring Break.

Comedian Pauly Shore's big break came as an on-air MTV VJ, a position he held from 1989 to 1994. At the height of his MTV fame, Shore had his own show, Totally Pauly, serving as a host on MTV's annual Spring break parties.

Kathleen McClellan has appeared as herself as a guest host on shows such as Wild On E!, MTV Spring Break, and as herself as a TV personality on Run Away With the Rich and Famous, Search Party and The X Show.

Audra Lynn appeared in an episode of Viva La Bam on MTV as well as being mentioned by Sum 41 onTotal Request Live, and appeared on Spring Break MTV 2003 .

As a host, Dan Levy has worked on four MTV shows including Your Face Or Mine and MTV Spring Break, and his own talk show for College Humor: IHaveToGoInAMinuteShow, a daily comedy show directed by Todd Strauss-Schulson.

Erinn Westbrook served as one of the main hosts of MTV Spring Break 2010, 2011 and 2012. April Rose Haydock hosted MTV Spring Break 2014 from Cancun, Mexico alongside Guy Code castmate Andrew Schultz.

== In popular culture ==
In a sketch from "Episode 6" of the seventh season of Mad TV, Fred Durst (Will Sasso) hosts an episode of MTV Spring Break. "Episode 13" of the tenth season of Mad TV meanwhile, featured a sketch involving Hispanic girls Lida (Nicole Sullivan) and Melina (Debra Wilson) as contestants on MTV Spring Break.

On an episode of Drake & Josh titled "The Drake & Josh Inn", the show came to the titular characters' house for their spring break party.

MTV Spring Break would serve as the basis for an episode of the sitcom The Goldbergs from its fifth season also called "MTV Spring Break".

The first episode of How To with John Wilson is set largely at an MTV Spring Break event in Cancún.

== See also ==
- List of programs broadcast by MTV § Special events
