= South Beach Street Historic District =

Historic district in Florida, United States

- U.S. National Register of Historic Places
- U.S. Historic district
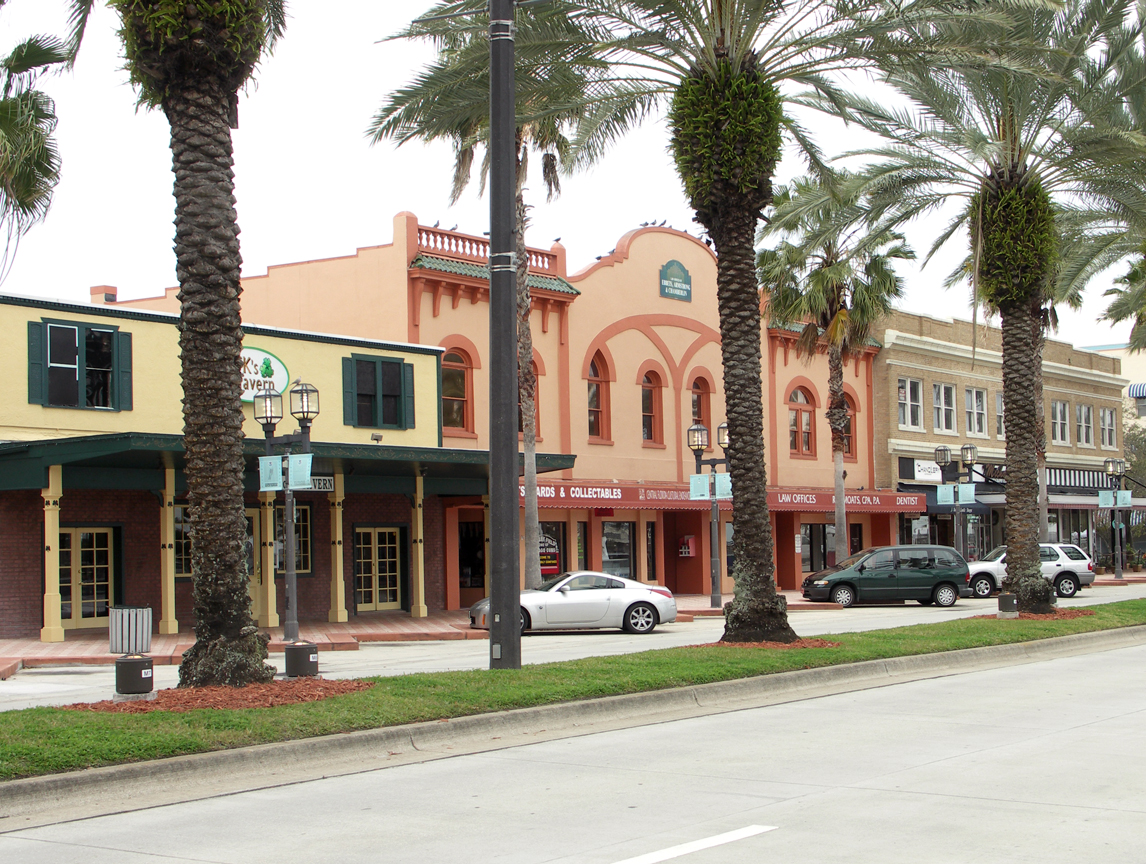

- Location within Volusia County
- Location: Daytona Beach, Florida United States
- Coordinates: 29°12′18″N 81°1′3″W
- Area: 650 acres (2.6 km^{2})
- NRHP reference No.: 88001597
- Added to NRHP: September 15, 1988

The South Beach Street Historic District is a U.S. historic district (designated as such on September 15, 1988) located in Daytona Beach, Florida. The district is bounded by Volusia Avenue, South Beach Street, South Street, and U.S. 1. It contains 154 historic buildings.

== Gallery ==
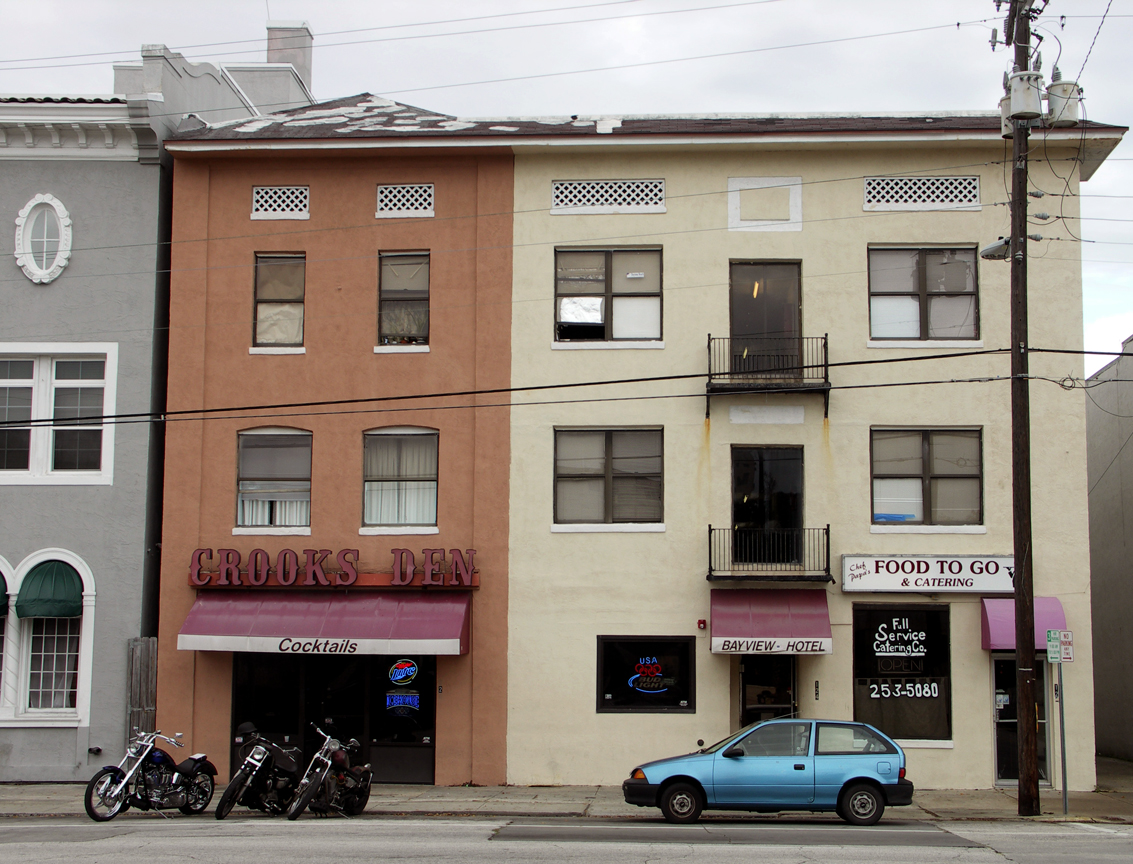
Businesses in the Historic District

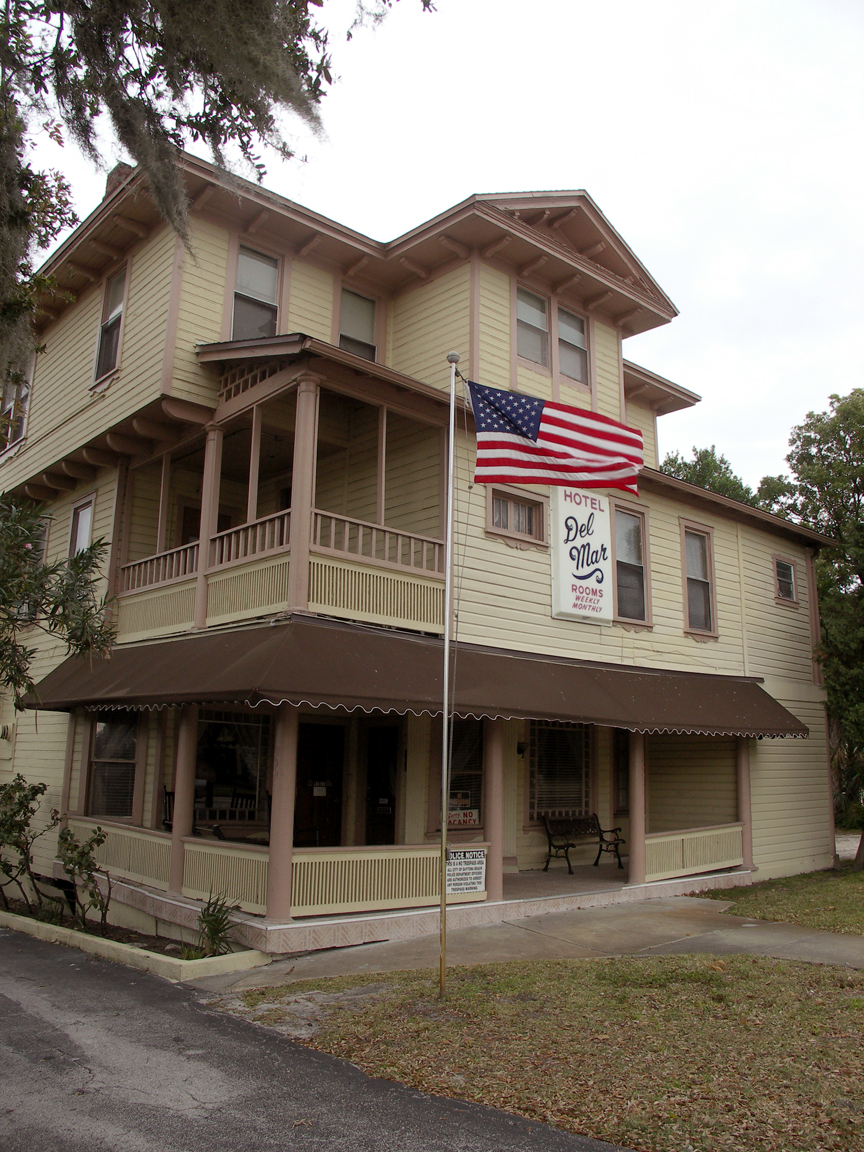
The Hotel Del Mar

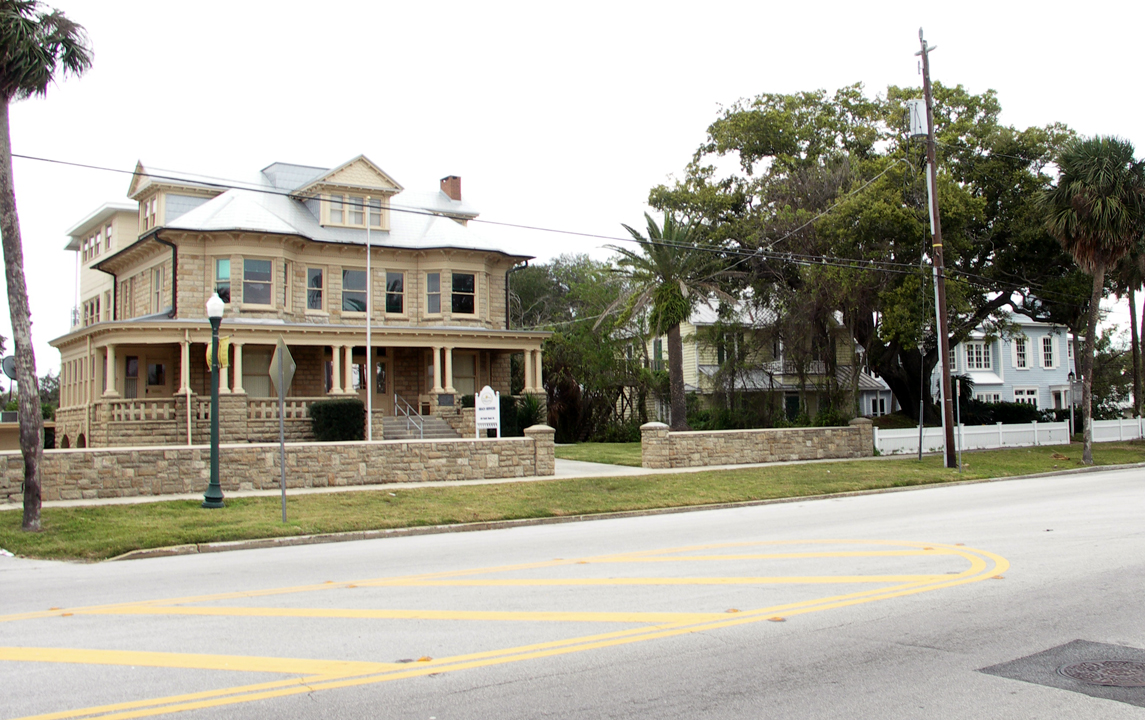
Houses in the Historic District, including The Abbey on the far right
