= Daytona Beach Bandshell =

- U.S. National Register of Historic Places
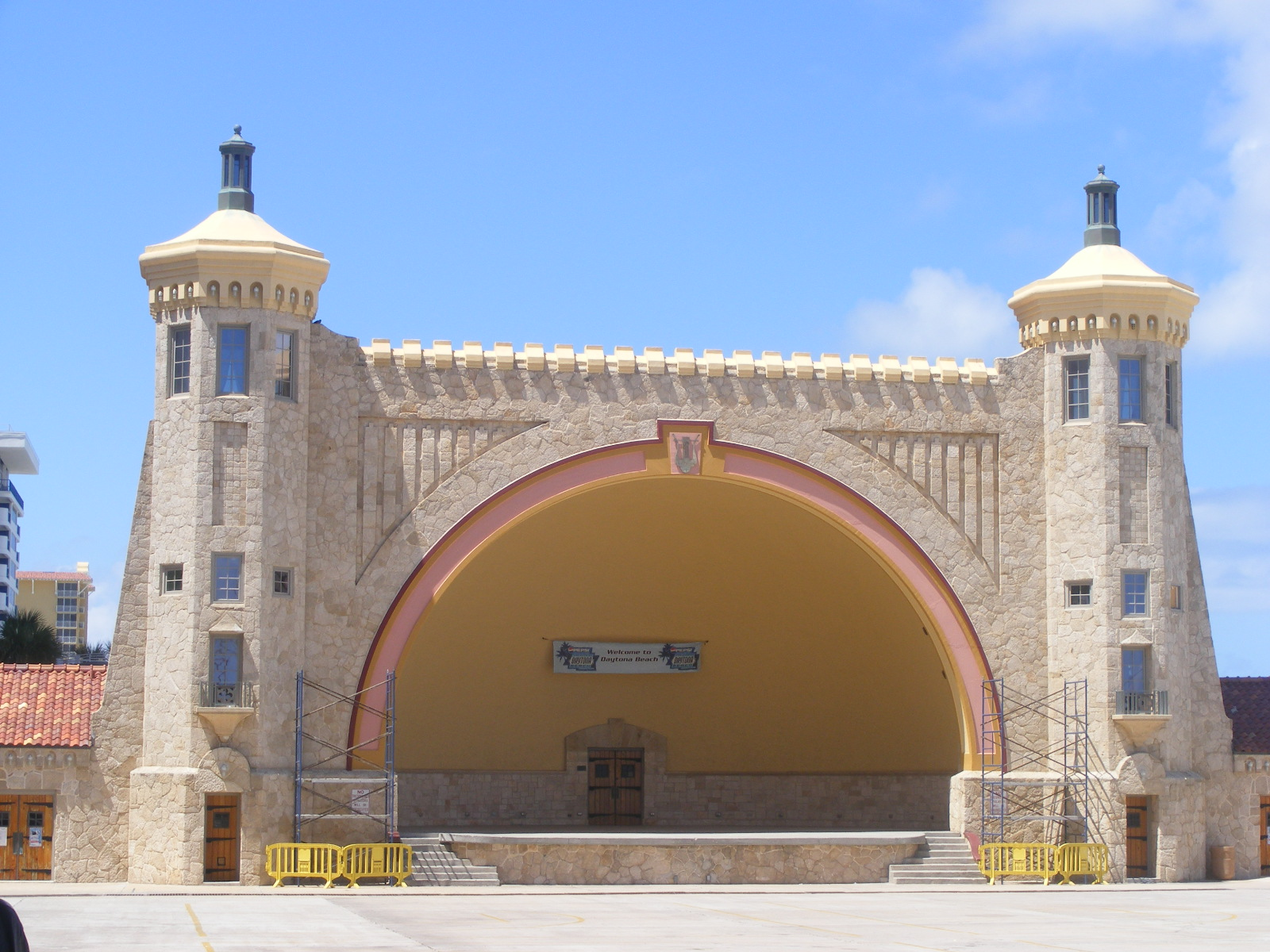
- Daytona Beach Bandshell

- Location within Volusia County
- Location: Daytona Beach, Florida
- Coordinates: 29°13′54″N 81°00′34″W
- Built: 1936-37
- Architect: Alan J. MacDonough
- Architectural style: Late Gothic Revival
- MPS: Daytona Beach Multiple Property Submission
- NRHP reference No.: 99000159
- Added to NRHP: March 5, 1999

The Daytona Beach Bandshell is an amphitheatre in Daytona Beach, Florida, United States. It is located at Ocean Avenue, north of the junction of Main Street and Atlantic Avenue. On March 5, 1999, it was added to the U.S. National Register of Historic Places. On April 18, 2012, the AIA's Florida Chapter placed the Daytona Beach Bandshell on its list of Florida Architecture: 100 Years. 100 Places.

This property is part of the Daytona Beach Multiple Property Submission to the National Register.

== History ==
In the 1920s, residents of Daytona Beach considered this area to be run-down and held discussions on ways to improve it.

In 1936, WPA workers began construction on this community-use project that was to cost Daytona Beach $84,000, the federal government $184,000, and be completed in 1938. Originally known as "Broadwalk", common usage gradually changed the name to the boardwalk.

The first facility constructed was the 48 by 114 ft (15 by 35 m) natural coquina rock bandshell which seats 4,500. This was begun in September, 1936, and was completed in time for the first program to be presented on July 4, 1937. Open air concerts, as well as other programs, are still presented in the bandshell. The other structures in the boardwalk area are a clock tower, kiosk, concession facilities, restrooms, subway entrances (now closed), and an elevated walk from Earl to Ora Streets.

A local city orchestra, under Everett Allyn Moses, began in 1947. They gave summer concerts in the Bandshell and winter concerts at the city recreation hall. Moses also organized a Junior Orchestra. William P. Schueler became the director of both orchestras after Moses retired in 1952.

The bandshell, with the ocean for a backdrop, served as the site of an October 5, 1992, campaign rally attended by presidential candidate Bill Clinton and running mate Al Gore and their wives, one of several stops during their cross-state bus tour through Florida a month before the 1992 election. The capacity is 5,000.

MTV Spring Break has held concerts at the Bandshell in Daytona. In 1987, Crowded House, The Fixx, and Blink-182 are among the acts to have played at the venue as part of the events.
