= Dayton Historic District (Dayton, Indiana) =

Historic district in Indiana, United States

- U.S. National Register of Historic Places
- U.S. Historic district
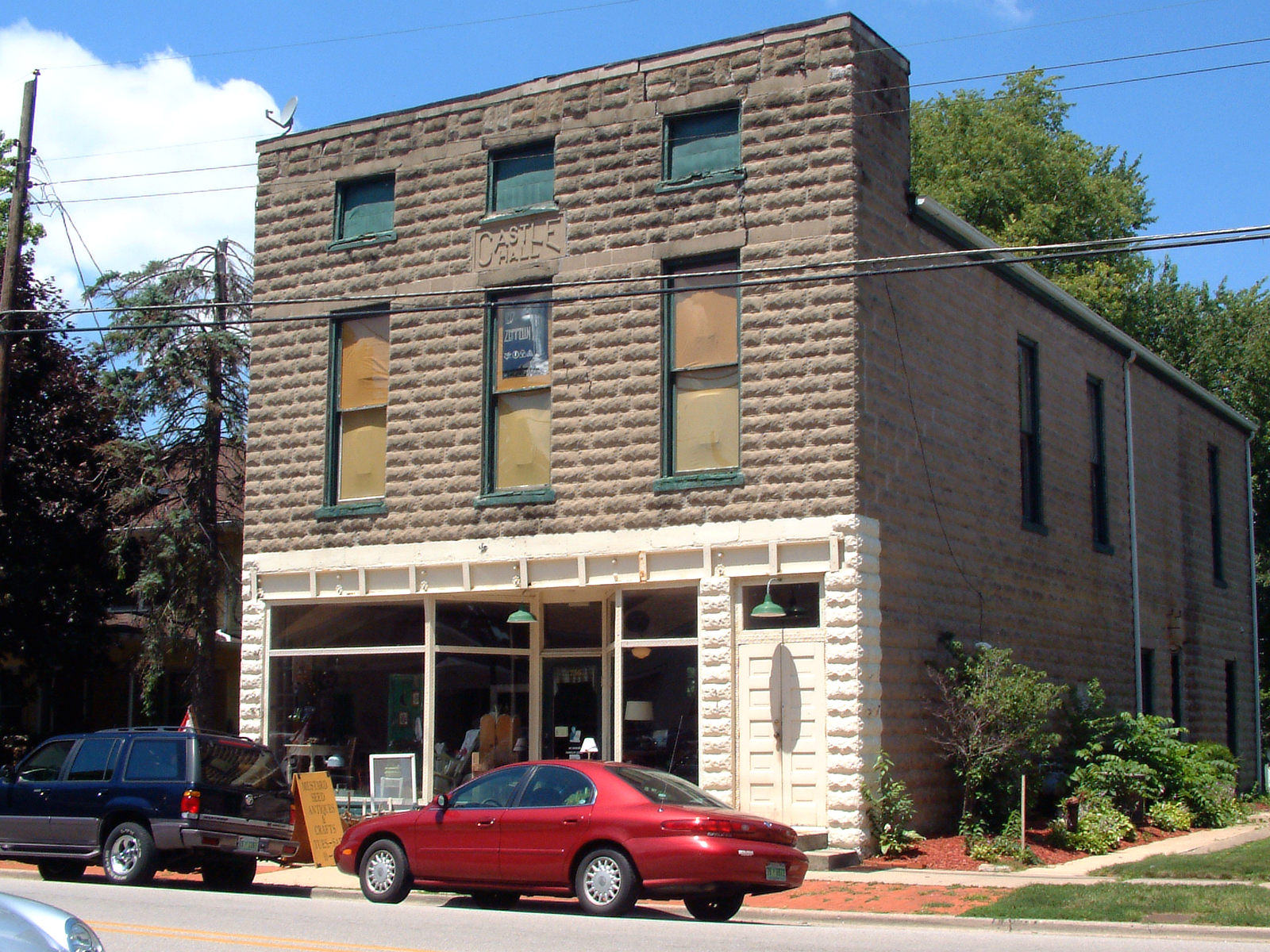
- Castle Hall, July 2007

- Location within Tippecanoe County, Indiana Location within Indiana Location within the United States
- Location: Roughly bounded by Walnut, Harrison, and Pennsylvania Sts., Dayton, Indiana
- Coordinates: 40°22′35″N 86°46′03″W
- Area: 10 acres (4.0 ha)
- Architectural style: Greek Revival, Late Victorian
- NRHP reference No.: 03000142
- Added to NRHP: March 26, 2003

Dayton Historic District is a national historic district located at Dayton, Indiana. The district encompasses 82 contributing buildings and one contributing site in the central business district and surrounding residential sections of Dayton. It developed between about 1830 and 1952 and includes representative examples of Greek Revival, Italianate, Second Empire, and Bungalow / American Craftsman style architecture. Notable contributing resources include the Lantz Building (1941), Reincke-Hawkins House (c. 1860), Castle Block (1894), Baker-Yost House (c. 1847), First Presbyterian Church (1899), and Gladden-Goldsbury House (c. 1878).

It was listed on the National Register of Historic Places in 2003.
