= Larry Kelly =

American politician and engineer (born c. 1935)

Mayor of Daytona Beach, Florida
- In office 1974–1993
- Preceded by: Richard Kane
- Succeeded by: Paul Carpenella

Personal details
- Born: 1934 or 1935 (age 90–91) Carbondale, Pennsylvania, U.S.
- Spouse: Joan Kelly (died 2015)
- Children: 5

Lawrence J. Kelly Sr. (born c. 1935) is an American former politician and logistics engineer. He served as the mayor of Daytona Beach, Florida, for 12 consecutive terms from 1974 to 1993. He was instrumental with getting MTV to showcase Spring Break in Daytona Beach during 1986–1993, although he later lamented it was a mistake because locals experienced many problems due to it.

== Biography ==
Kelly, who was born circa 1935, is a native of Carbondale, Pennsylvania. He served in the U.S. Air Force.

Kelly was a logistics engineer by profession. In 1963, he and his wife moved to Daytona Beach, Florida, while Kelly was employed by General Electric. He retired from General Electric in 1991. In 1994, the gridiron at Municipal Stadium in Daytona Beach (now known as Daytona Stadium) was named for him.

In 2000, Kelly was elected to the board of directors of the Stewart-Marchman Foundation. In 2017, Kelly joined with retired Yonkers, New York, police commissioner Albert McEvoy to solve Daytona Beach cold cases.

=== Politics ===
Kelly was on the Daytona Beach planning board for four years before being elected to the Daytona Beach city commission in 1971. Kelly was a commissioner until he was elected mayor in 1974 in a special election to fill the vacancy in that office. Kelly then served as mayor of Daytona Beachfor 12 consecutive two-year terms, from 1974 to 1993.

After Fort Lauderdale started discouraging college students from vacationing there for Spring Break in the mid-1980s, Kelly appeared on national television to encourage college vacationers to come to Daytona Beach for Spring Break instead. Soon after, beer and cigarette brands started advertising in Daytona Beach for Spring Break. MTV Spring Break coverage moved to Daytona Beach in 1986. He later called that decision a mistake as locals experienced many problems during Spring Break every year. Kelly's efforts to rein in the revelry included promoting athletic competitions called "Spring Games" to channel youthful energy in a wholesome direction, and proposing that hotels be billed for the cost of sending police to respond to calls during spring break.

In 1993, Kelly lost his bid for re-election to a potential 13th term in a major upset. Kelly was defeated by restaurateur Paul Carpenella by 210 votes. Carpenella received 3,689 votes (50.3%), to win the mayoral election, while Kelly placed second, garnering 3,479 votes (47.4%). Turnout in the 1993 municipal election was just 25%. That year, Daytona Beach officials cut their Spring Break marketing budget and ties with MTV.

=== Personal life ===
Kelly's wife, Jane, a registered nurse, died on July 31, 2015, at the age of 78. The couple had five children. One son, Chris Kelly, was elected a Volusia County court judge in 2012 with 63% of the vote.
