= East Dayton Street Historic District =

Historic district in Wisconsin, United States

- U.S. National Register of Historic Places
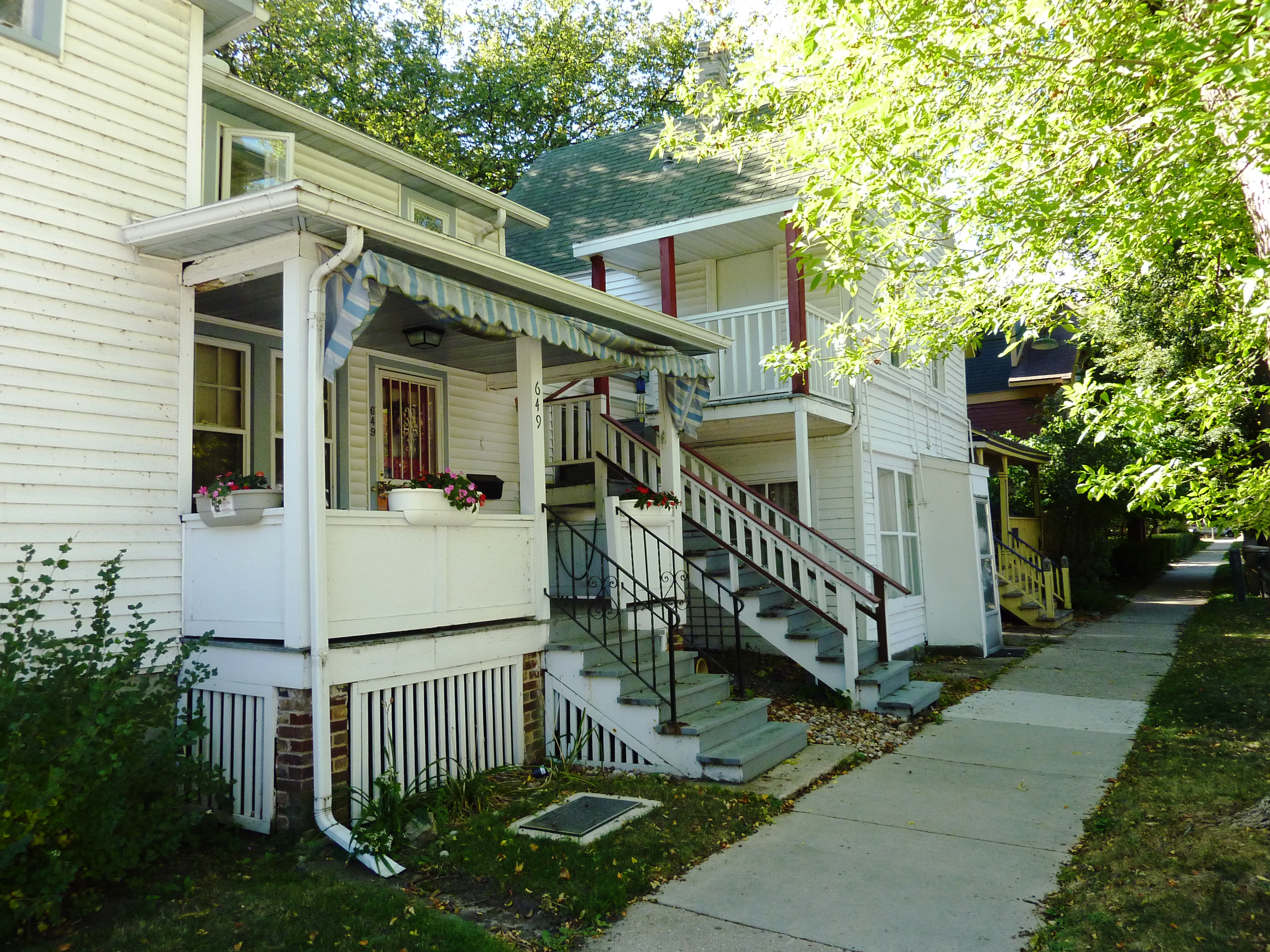
- A portion of the district, September 2012

- Location within Wisconsin Location within the United States
- Interactive map showing the location for East Dayton Street Historic District
- Location: 649–653 East Dayton Street and 114 North Blount Street; Madison, Wisconsin; United States
- Coordinates: 43°04′51″N 89°22′43″W
- Area: 0.4 acres (0.16 ha)
- NRHP reference No.: 88000217
- Added to NRHP: December 27, 1988

The East Dayton Street Historic District is a historic district located in Madison, Wisconsin, United States, that is listed on the National Register of Historic Places (NRHP). The district includes three neighboring buildings at 647 East Dayton Street, 649–653 East Dayton Street, and 114 North Blount Street. The buildings are the last remnant of Madison's first Black neighborhood, which developed around East Dayton Street in the early twentieth century.

== Description ==
The small 0.4-acre (0.16 ha) district includes three buildings. All three buildings were moved from other parts of Madison to their current sites in the early twentieth century. The Miller House at 647 East Dayton Street, which was relocated in 1908, is a two-story wood frame house that was once home to William and Anna Mae Miller and their family. It is listed independently on the NRHP. The building at 649–653 East Dayton Street is made up of two conjoined buildings moved to the site in 1901 and 1912 respectively; one was used as a commercial property, while the other was a house. The one-and-a-half-story house at 114 North Blount Street was moved to its site in 1923.

== History ==
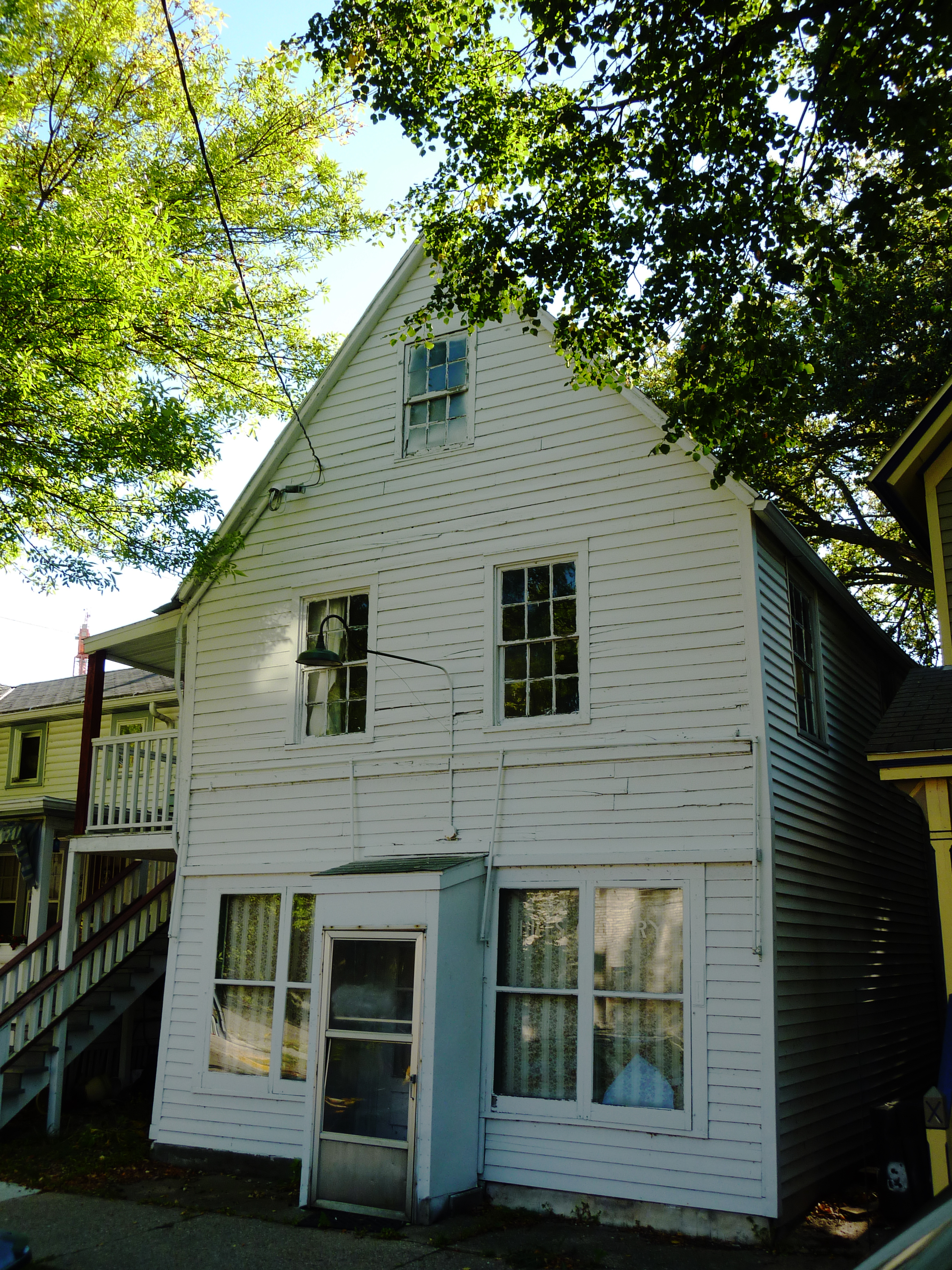
Douglas Beneficial Hall/Hill Grocery

East Dayton Street was the first Black neighborhood to form in Madison in the early twentieth century. The first Black family to move to the area was that of John Turner, who settled in a now-demolished house on Blount Street in 1898; they were one of 19 Black households in Madison in 1900. The Turner family founded the Douglas Beneficial Society, a charity to support the city's Black residents; they opened the building at 649 Dayton Street in 1901 to serve as its meeting hall. William Miller, who was a tenant in the Turner family's boarding house in 1900 or 1901, also became an early leader of the neighborhood. Miller worked as a messenger for Wisconsin governor Robert M. La Follette.

Turner and Miller founded the city's African Methodist Episcopal Church in 1902. While the original church building no longer stands, the church was a key institution in the neighborhood's early years. The house at 653 East Dayton Street was originally home to C. H. Thomas, the church's pastor, and his family. Another community organization, a Prince Hall Masonic lodge, was founded in 1906, though it did not have a dedicated building. Miller married Anna Mae Stewart in 1904, and the couple would come to own three houses in the neighborhood; the house at 647 East Dayton, which was a boarding house before becoming the family's home in 1919, is the only survivor of the three. By 1910, roughly half of the city's Black households lived in the East Dayton neighborhood. These included the family of Benjamin Butts, a Civil War veteran who had lived in Madison since 1867.

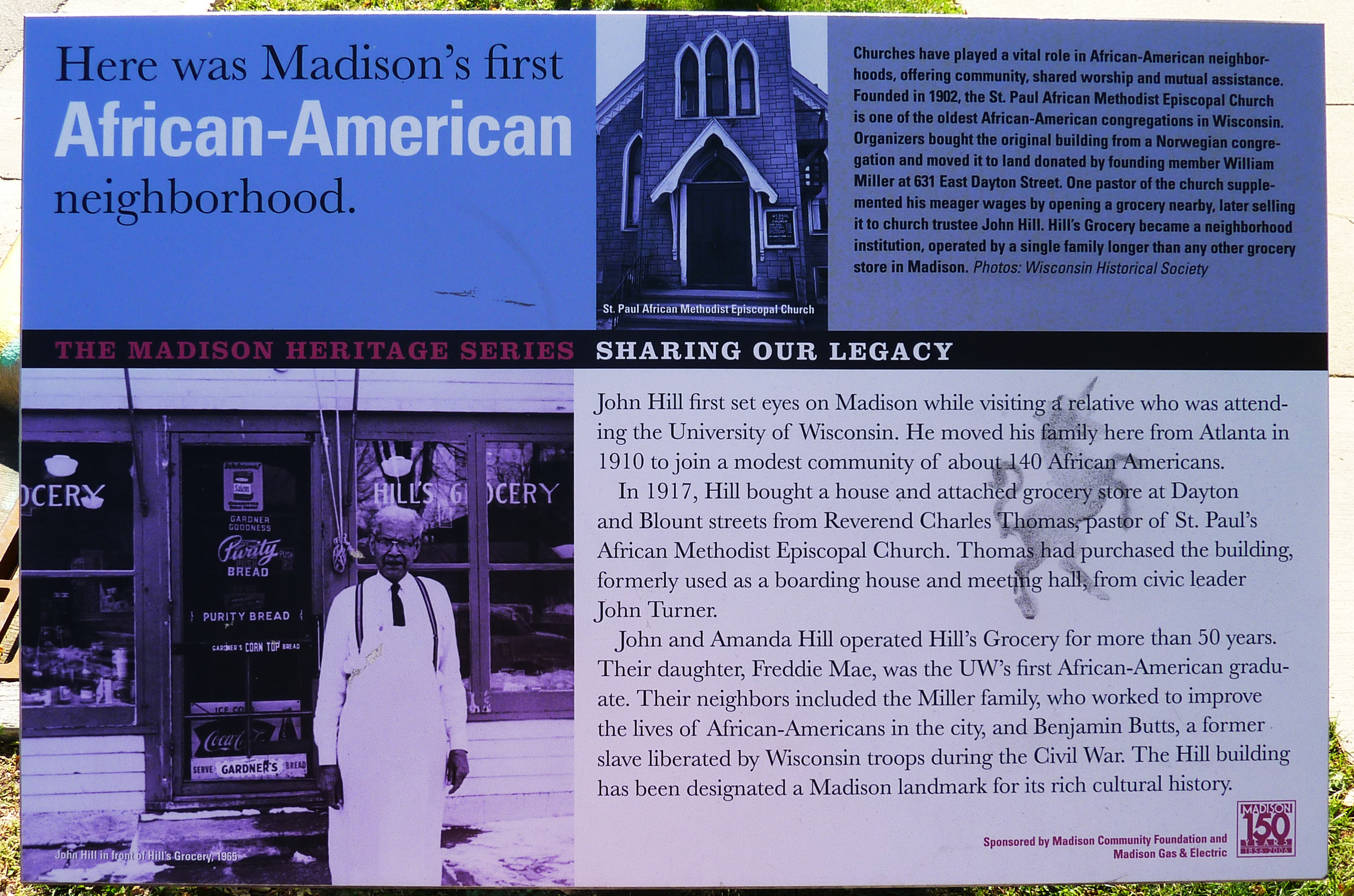
Plaque with a photo of John Hill in front of his store

In 1917, John and Amanda Hill converted the Douglas Beneficial Society hall to a grocery store. John Hill was also a longtime member and trustee of the AME Church. The house at 114 North Blount was relocated in 1923 for Amanda Hill's mother, Ida Carmichael. After 1923, the neighborhood stabilized in size, as new Black Madisonians began to settle in the Greenbush neighborhood on Madison's west side instead. The neighborhood began to decline in the 1960s as residents moved to other parts of the city, and many of its original buildings were demolished.

The district was listed on the National Register of Historic Places on March 22, 1988, and on the State Register of Historic Places the following year.

== See also ==
- National Register of Historic Places listings in Madison, Wisconsin
