= Tarragona (disambiguation) =

Tarragona may refer to:

== Places ==
- Tarragona, a municipality of province of Tarragona, Catalonia, Spain
- Province of Tarragona, a province of Catalonia
- Tarragona, Davao Oriental, municipality in the province of Davao Oriental, Philippines

== Sport ==
- Gimnàstic de Tarragona, a sports club based in Tarragona, Catalonia, Spain
- CB Tarragona, a professional Basketball team based in Tarragona, Catalonia
- Open Tarragona Costa Daurada, a tennis tournament held in Tarragona, Catalonia
- Nou Estadi de Tarragona, a multi-purpose stadium in Tarragona, Catalonia

== Other uses ==
- Tarragona (DO), a Spanish Denominación de Origen (DO) for wines located in the province of Tarragona, Catalonia, Spain
- Tarragona (Barcelona Metro), a station in the Barcelona Metro network, served by L3 (green line), located under Tarragona Street, Barcelona, Catalonia
- Tarragona (Spanish Congress Electoral District), the electoral district covering the province for elections to the Spanish Parliament
- Tarragona Tower, a structure composed of a tower and arch built of coquina stone in Daytona Beach, Florida, United States
- Tarragona Amphitheatre, a Roman amphitheatre in the city of Tarragona, Catalonia
- Roman Catholic Archdiocese of Tarragona, a Roman Catholic ecclesiastical territory located in the province of Tarragona, Catalonia
- Tarragona Cathedral, a Roman Catholic church in Tarragona, Catalonia
- Himerius of Tarragona, a bishop of Tarragona during the 4th century
- Tarragona International Dixieland Festival, was started in Tarragona, Catalonia
- Wall of Tarragona, a wall located in Tarragona, Catalonia
- Council of Tarragona, was held by Archbishop John of Tarragona, Catalonia
- Camp de Tarragona, a natural and historical region of Catalonia

== See also ==
- Siege of Tarragona (disambiguation)
