= Daytona Beach, Florida =

City in Florida, United States

- City
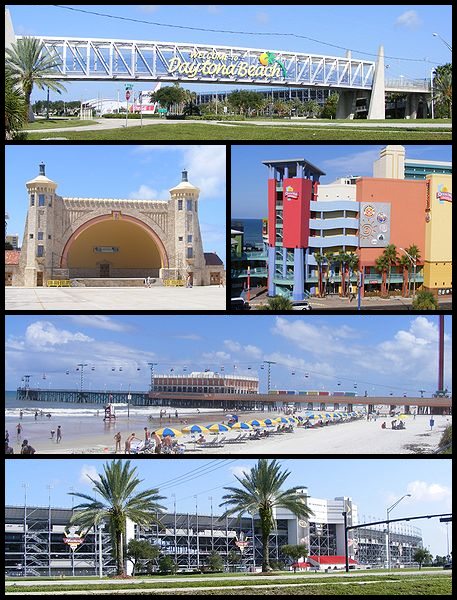
- From top, left to right: Welcome sign when entering Daytona Beach; Daytona Beach Bandshell; Ocean Walk Shoppes; Daytona Beach Pier; Daytona International Speedway

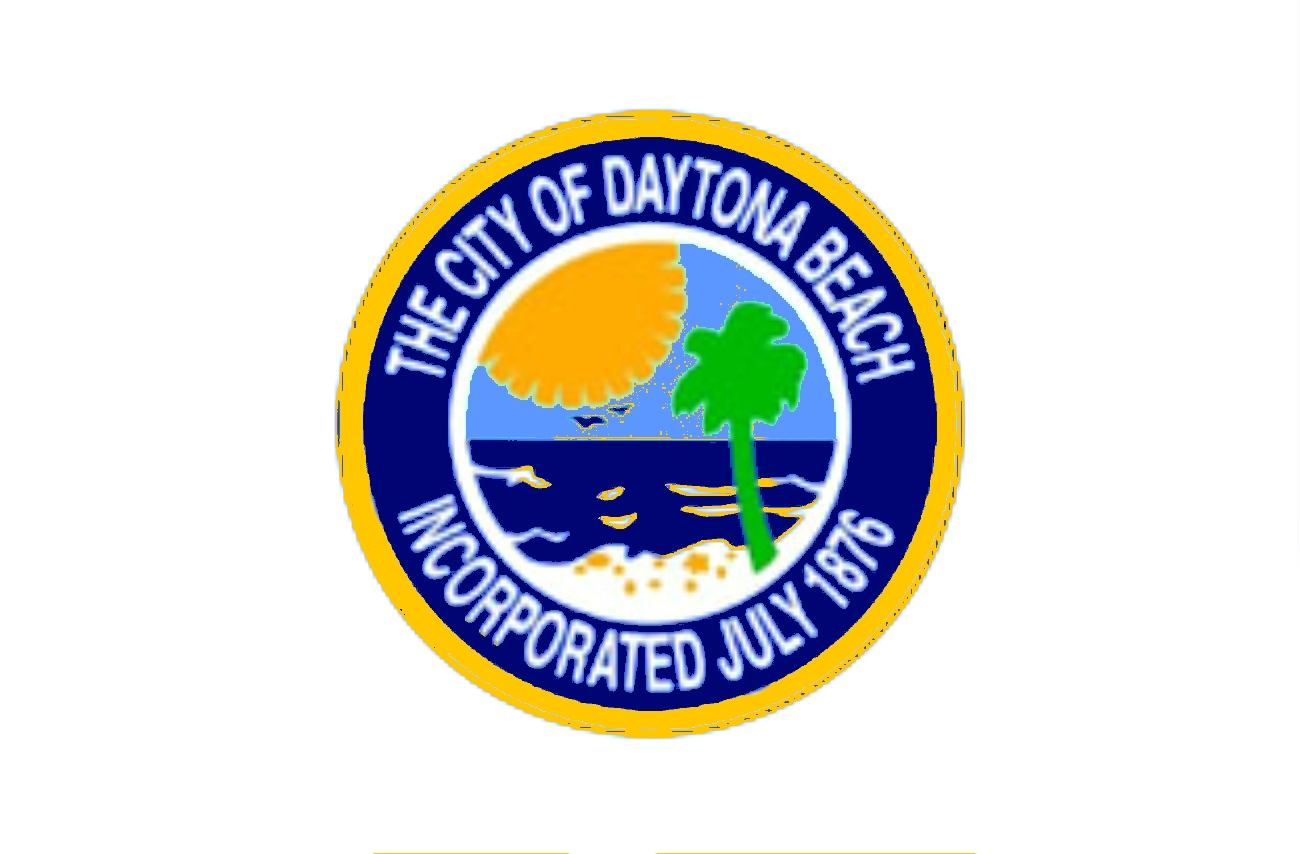
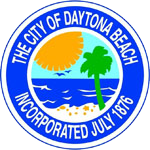
- Flag Seal Logo
- Nicknames: "The World's Most Famous Beach", "The Spring Break Capital of the World"
- Interactive map of Daytona Beach, Florida
- Location within Florida Location within the United States
- Coordinates: 29°12′39″N 81°05′22″W
- Country: United States
- State: Florida
- County: Volusia
- Founded: 1870
- Incorporated (Town of Daytona): July 26, 1876
- Incorporated (City of Daytona Beach): 1926

Government
  - Type: Commission–Manager
  - Mayor: Derrick Henry (D)

Area
  - City: 68.19 sq mi (176.62 km^{2})
  - Land: 65.59 sq mi (169.89 km^{2})
  - Water: 2.60 sq mi (6.74 km^{2})
  - Urban: 212.36 sq mi (550.0 km^{2})
- Elevation: 13 ft (4.0 m)

Population (2020)
  - City: 72,647
  - Estimate (2025): 88,471
  - Density: 1,107.5/sq mi (427.62/km^{2})
  - Urban: 402,126 (104th U.S.)
  - Urban density: 1,894/sq mi (731.1/km^{2})
  - Metro: 668,921 (87th U.S.)
  - CSA: 4,197,095 (15th U.S.)
- Time zone: UTC−5 (EST)
  - Summer (DST): UTC−4 (EDT)
- ZIP Codes: 32114-32126, 32198
- Area code: 386
- FIPS code: 12-16525
- GNIS feature ID: 2404197
- Website: daytonabeach.gov

Daytona Beach is a coastal resort city in Volusia County, Florida, United States. Located on the East Coast of the United States, its population was 72,647 at the 2020 census. It is part of the Deltona–Daytona Beach–Ormond Beach metropolitan area, and is a principal city of the Fun Coast region of Florida.

Daytona Beach is historically known for its beach, where motorized vehicles are permitted on some hard-packed sand beaches. Motorsports on the beach became popular, and the Daytona Beach and Road Course hosted races for over 50 years, replaced in 1959 by Daytona International Speedway. The city is the headquarters of NASCAR.

== History ==
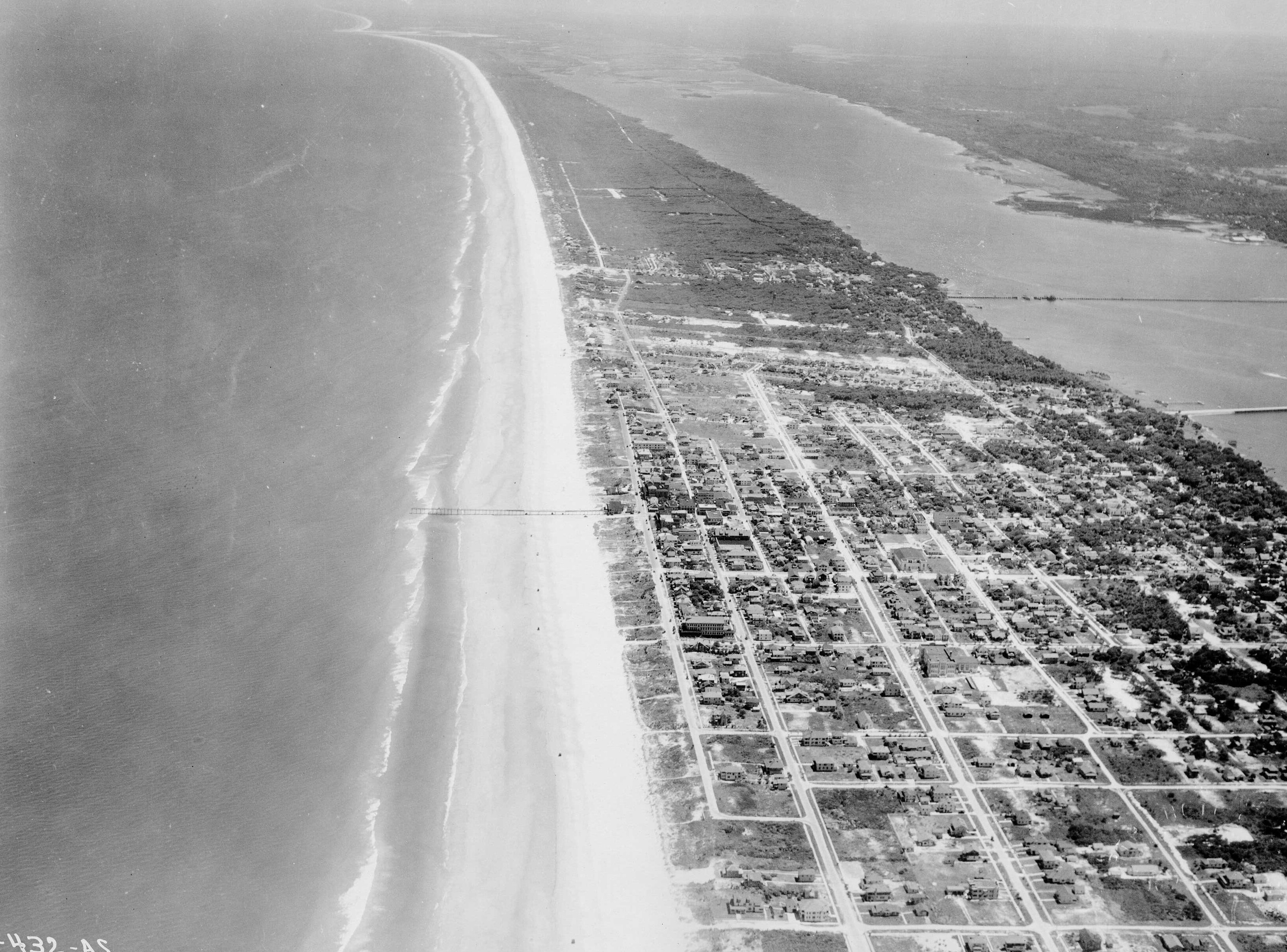
Daytona Beach in 1924

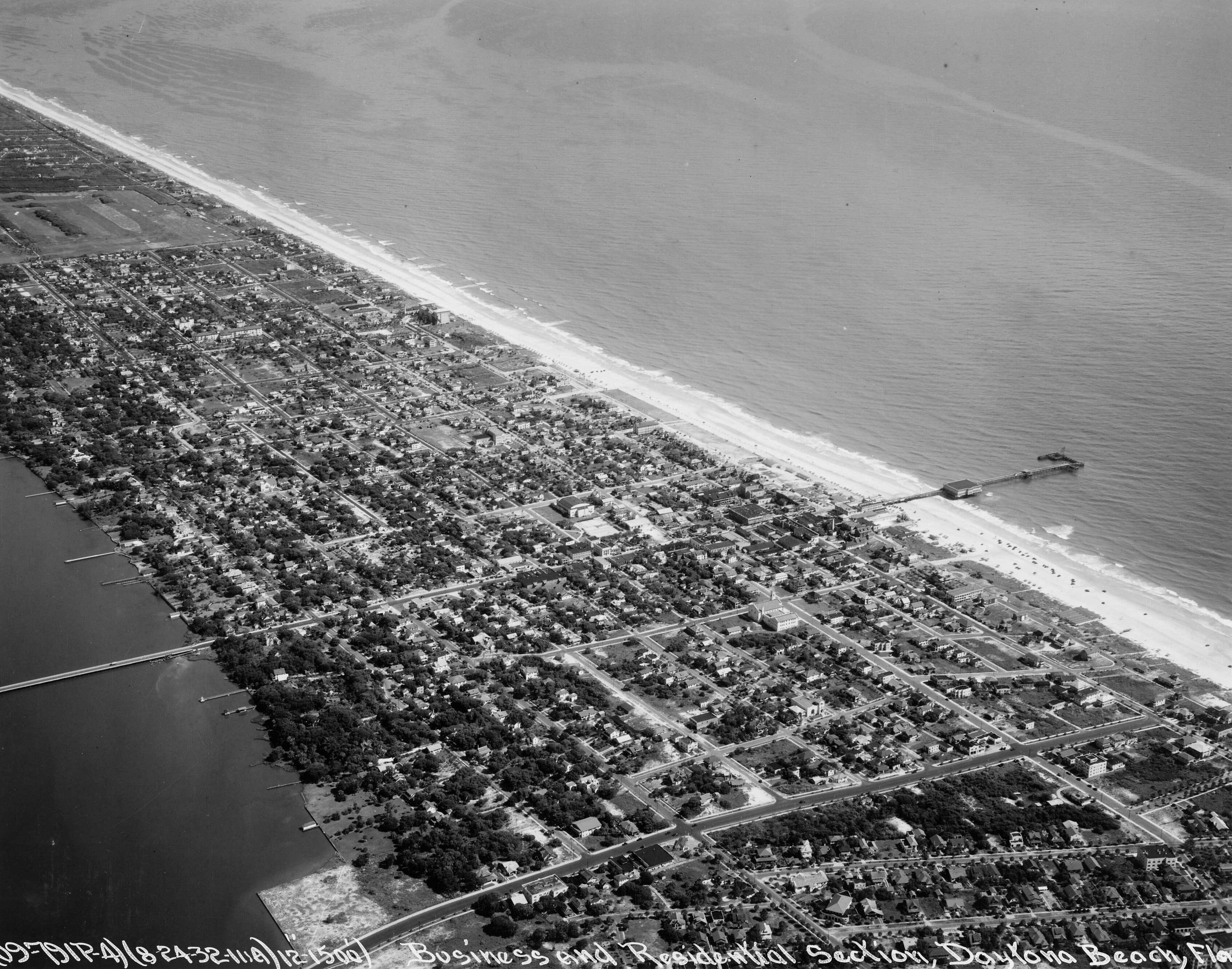
Daytona Beach in 1932

At the time of European contact, the area where Daytona Beach is located was inhabited by the Freshwater people, a branch of the Timucua. The town of Nocoroco in what is now Tomoka State Park was the most important in the region. The villages of Caçaroy and Cicale were a short distance south of there. The southernmost Timucua town was Caparaca, in present-day New Smyrna Beach. There were only small hamlets between Cicale and Caparaca. Turtle Mound, 14 miles (23 km) south of New Smyrna Beach, was the site of the town of Surruque, belonging to the Surruque people, whose territory extended south to Cape Canaveral. Like other Indigenous peoples in Florida, the Freshwater Timucua and Surruque were nearly exterminated by contact with Europeans through war, enslavement (the Spanish enslaved some Surruque war captives in 1598), and disease and became extinct as racial entities through assimilation and attrition during the 18th century. The Seminole, descendants of Muscogee people from Georgia and Alabama, frequented the area prior to the Second Seminole War.

During the era of British rule of Florida between 1763 and 1783, the King's Road passed through present-day Daytona Beach. The road extended from Saint Augustine, the capital of East Florida, to Andrew Turnbull's experimental colony in New Smyrna. In 1804, Samuel Williams received a land grant of 3,000 acres (12 km^{2}) from the Spanish Crown, which had regained Florida from the British after the American Revolutionary War. This land grant encompassed the area that would become Daytona Beach. Williams built a slave labor-based plantation to grow cotton, rice, and sugar cane. His son Samuel Hill Williams abandoned the plantation during the Second Seminole War, when the Seminoles burned it to the ground.

The area now known as the Daytona Beach Historical District was once the Orange Grove Plantation, a citrus and sugarcane plantation granted to Samuel Williams in 1787. The plantation was situated on the west bank of the tidal channel known as the Halifax River, 12 miles north of Mosquito Inlet. Williams was a British loyalist from North Carolina who fled to the Bahamas with his family until the Spanish reopened Florida to non-Spanish immigration. After his death in 1810, the plantation was run by his family until it was burned down in 1835. In 1871, Mathias Day Jr. of Mansfield, Ohio, purchased the 3,200-acre tract of the former Orange Grove Plantation. He built a hotel around which the initial section of town arose. In 1872, due to financial troubles, Day lost title to his land; nonetheless, residents decided to name the city Daytona in his honor, and incorporated the town in 1876.

In 1886, the St. Johns & Halifax River Railway arrived in Daytona. The line was purchased in 1889 by Henry M. Flagler, who made it part of his Florida East Coast Railway. The separate towns of Daytona, Daytona Beach, Kingston, and Seabreeze merged as "Daytona Beach" in 1926, at the urging of civic leader J. B. Kahn and others. By the 1920s, it was dubbed "the World's Most Famous Beach".

Daytona's wide beach of smooth, compacted sand attracted automobile and motorcycle races beginning in 1902, as pioneers in the industry tested their inventions. It hosted land speed record attempts beginning in 1904, when William K. Vanderbilt set an unofficial record of 92.307 mph (148.554 km/h). Land speed racers from Barney Oldfield to Henry Segrave to Malcolm Campbell would visit Daytona repeatedly and make the 23 mi (37 km) beach course famous. Record attempts, including numerous fatal endeavors such as Frank Lockhart (Stutz Black Hawk, 1928) and Lee Bible (Triplex Special, 1929), would continue until Campbell's March 7, 1935 effort, which set the record at 276.816 mph (445.492 km/h) and marked the end of Daytona's land speed racing days.

On March 8, 1936, the first stock car race was held on the Daytona Beach Road Course, located in the present-day Town of Ponce Inlet. In 1958, Bill France Sr. and NASCAR created the Daytona International Speedway to replace the beach course. Automobiles are still permitted on most areas of the beach, at a maximum speed of 10 mph (16 km/h).

Daytona Beach was severely damaged during the 2004 Atlantic hurricane season, especially by Hurricane Charley. In 2005, the city designated the several–mile radius around Main Street on the barrier island portion of the city as a blighted area and has targeted it for redevelopment by private developers. This follows the Supreme Court decision of the eminent domain case in Kelo v. City of New London, which upheld the right of municipalities to use eminent domain to take private property for redevelopment by private entities.

== Geography ==
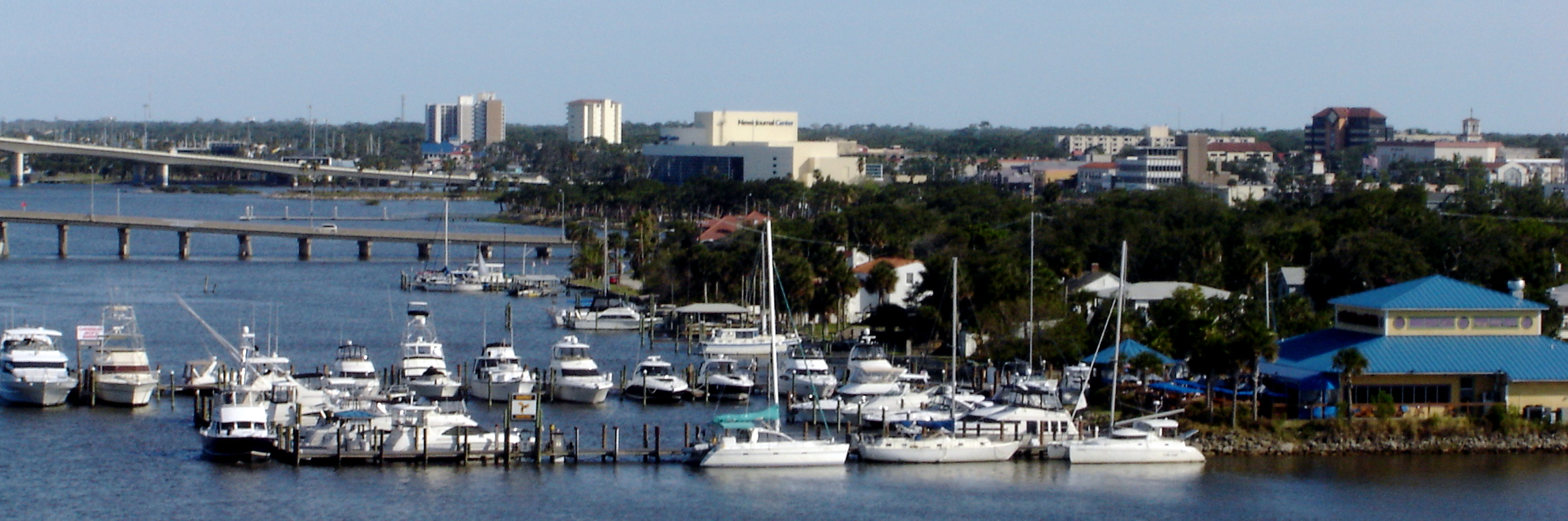
Daytona Beach

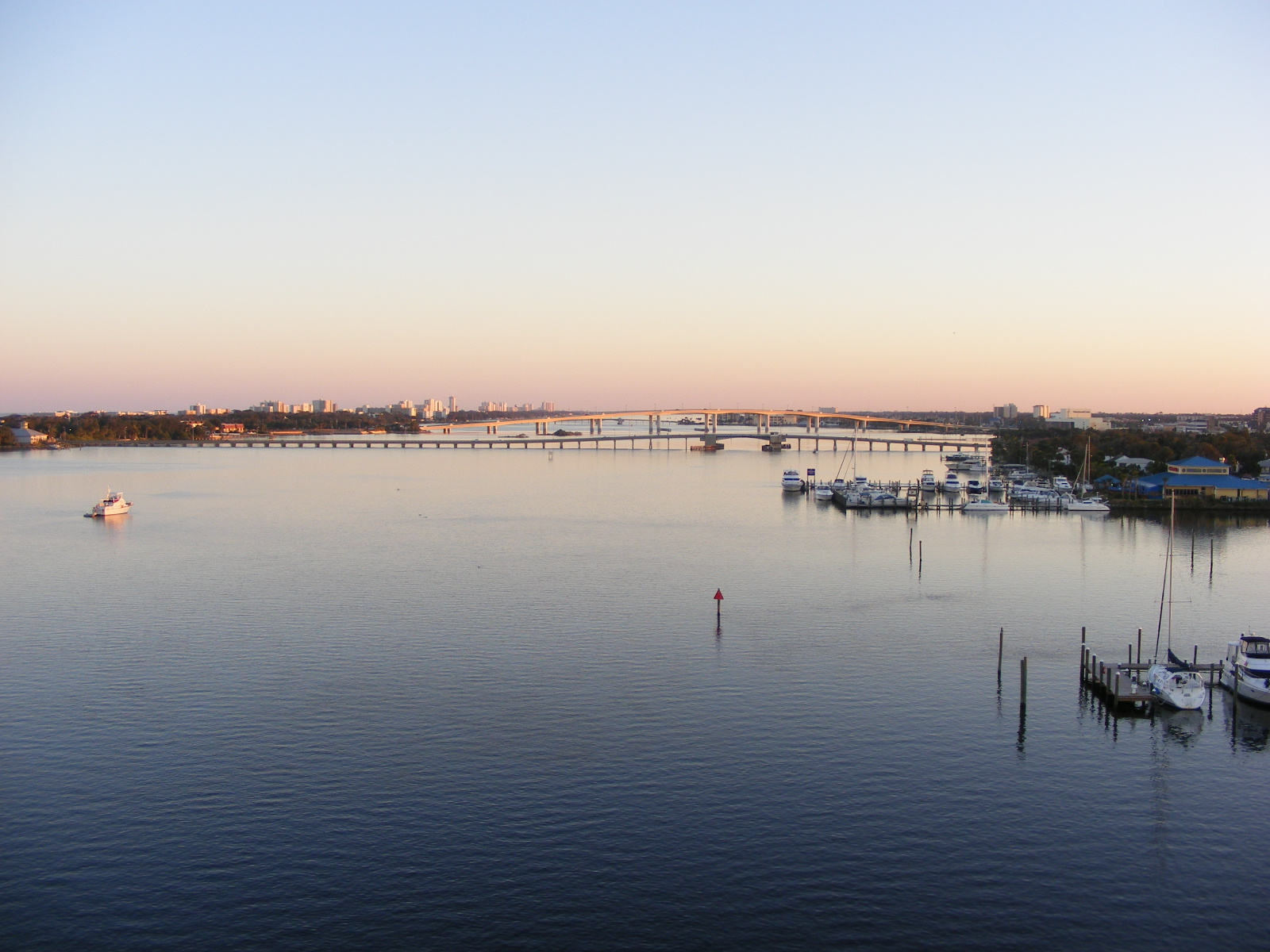
Daytona Beach, "beachside" on left (east) of the Halifax River, mainland on right (west)

According to the United States Census Bureau, the city has a total area of 64.93 sq mi (168 km^{2}), of which 6.25 sq mi (16 km^{2}) (9.6%) are covered by water.

The city of Daytona Beach is split in two by the Halifax River lagoon, part of the Intracoastal Waterway, and sits on the Atlantic Ocean. It is bordered on the north by Holly Hill and Ormond Beach and on the south by Daytona Beach Shores, South Daytona, and Port Orange.

Notable weather events that have caused damage or injury in Daytona Beach include Hurricane Donna in 1960, the 1998 Kissimmee tornado outbreak, and Hurricane Charley in 2004. In 1992, a 28-mile (45 km) long rogue wave with a 9-foot (2.7 m) high crest hit Daytona Beach, causing property damage and 75 reported injuries.

=== Climate ===
Daytona Beach has a humid subtropical climate (Köppen climate classification Cfa), which is typical of the Gulf and South Atlantic states. As is typical of much of Florida, two seasons are seen in Daytona Beach - the warmer, wetter season (late May through October) and the cooler and drier season (November through April).

In summer, temperatures are relatively stable with an average of only 8 days annually with a maximum at or above 95 °F (35 °C); the last 100 °F (38 °C) reading was seen on August 2, 1999. The Bermuda High pumps hot and unstable tropical air from the Bahamas and Gulf of Mexico, resulting in daily, but brief thundershowers. This results in the months of June through September accounting for most of the average annual rainfall of 51.25 in (1,302 mm).

In winter, Daytona Beach has weather conditions typical of other cities on the Florida peninsula. On average, the coolest month is January, with a normal monthly mean temperature of 58.8 °F (14.9 °C). It is the only month where the average high temperature falls below 70.0 °F (21.1 °C). Occasional cold fronts can bring freezes, which from 1991 to 2020 were seen on an average of 3.0 nights annually; however, minima below 25 °F (−4 °C) are very rare, and were last seen on December 28, 2010. Like much of Florida, Daytona Beach often can be very dry in late winter and early spring, and brush fires and water restrictions can be an issue.

Official record temperatures range from 15 °F (−9 °C) on January 21, 1985, up to 102 °F (39 °C) on July 15, 1981, and June 24, 1944; the record cold daily maximum is 33 °F (1 °C) on Christmas Day 1983, while, conversely, the record warm daily minimum is 82 °F (28 °C) on September 1 and 10–11, 2008, and August 25, 2020. Annual rainfall has ranged from 31.36 in (797 mm) in 2006 and 1956, up to 79.29 in (2,014 mm) in 1953. The most rainfall to have occurred in a calendar day was 12.85 in (326 mm) on October 10, 1924, which contributed to 24.82 in (630 mm) of rain that fell that month, the most of any calendar month.

Climate data for Daytona Beach, Florida (Daytona Beach International Airport), 1991–2020 normals, extremes 1923–present
Month	Jan	Feb	Mar	Apr	May	Jun	Jul	Aug	Sep	Oct	Nov	Dec	Year
Record high °F (°C)	92 (33)	89 (32)	92 (33)	96 (36)	100 (38)	102 (39)	102 (39)	101 (38)	99 (37)	95 (35)	90 (32)	88 (31)	102 (39)
Mean maximum °F (°C)	82.0 (27.8)	83.9 (28.8)	87.3 (30.7)	89.7 (32.1)	93.8 (34.3)	95.0 (35.0)	95.4 (35.2)	95.3 (35.2)	92.7 (33.7)	89.5 (31.9)	85.2 (29.6)	82.5 (28.1)	96.9 (36.1)
Mean daily maximum °F (°C)	69.0 (20.6)	71.7 (22.1)	75.5 (24.2)	80.2 (26.8)	85.0 (29.4)	88.6 (31.4)	90.2 (32.3)	89.8 (32.1)	87.3 (30.7)	82.2 (27.9)	76.1 (24.5)	71.5 (21.9)	80.6 (27.0)
Daily mean °F (°C)	58.8 (14.9)	61.4 (16.3)	65.2 (18.4)	70.2 (21.2)	75.6 (24.2)	80.2 (26.8)	81.9 (27.7)	81.9 (27.7)	80.1 (26.7)	74.4 (23.6)	67.0 (19.4)	61.8 (16.6)	71.5 (21.9)
Mean daily minimum °F (°C)	48.5 (9.2)	51.1 (10.6)	54.8 (12.7)	60.1 (15.6)	66.2 (19.0)	71.8 (22.1)	73.5 (23.1)	74.1 (23.4)	72.9 (22.7)	66.7 (19.3)	57.9 (14.4)	52.1 (11.2)	62.5 (16.9)
Mean minimum °F (°C)	31.4 (−0.3)	34.6 (1.4)	38.9 (3.8)	46.4 (8.0)	55.7 (13.2)	66.3 (19.1)	70.0 (21.1)	70.4 (21.3)	66.7 (19.3)	52.0 (11.1)	42.2 (5.7)	35.7 (2.1)	29.7 (−1.3)
Record low °F (°C)	15 (−9)	23 (−5)	26 (−3)	32 (0)	40 (4)	52 (11)	60 (16)	63 (17)	52 (11)	39 (4)	25 (−4)	19 (−7)	15 (−9)
Average precipitation inches (mm)	2.73 (69)	2.34 (59)	3.63 (92)	2.23 (57)	3.69 (94)	6.94 (176)	6.01 (153)	6.58 (167)	7.15 (182)	4.85 (123)	2.76 (70)	2.34 (59)	51.25 (1,302)
Average precipitation days (≥ 0.01 in)	8.0	6.7	7.6	6.3	7.4	14.7	13.7	14.8	14.5	10.8	7.2	7.6	119.3
Source: NOAA all-time Feb record

Climate data for Daytona Beach
Month	Jan	Feb	Mar	Apr	May	Jun	Jul	Aug	Sep	Oct	Nov	Dec	Year
Average sea temperature °F (°C)	61.0 (16.1)	59.0 (15.0)	64.9 (18.3)	71.4 (21.9)	76.5 (24.7)	79.5 (26.4)	80.1 (26.7)	80.4 (26.9)	82.6 (28.1)	77.5 (25.3)	71.1 (21.7)	64.9 (18.3)	72.4 (22.5)
Mean daily daylight hours	11.0	11.0	12.0	13.0	14.0	14.0	14.0	13.0	12.0	11.0	11.0	10.0	12.2
Average Ultraviolet index	4	6	8	10	10	11	11	10	9	7	5	4	7.9
Source #1: NOAA Coastal Water Temperature Guide
Source #2: Weather Atlas

== Demographics ==
Historical population
Census	Pop.	Note	%±
1910	331		—
1920	825		149.2%
1930	16,598		1,911.9%
1940	22,584		36.1%
1950	30,167		33.6%
1960	37,395		24.0%
1970	45,327		21.2%
1980	54,176		19.5%
1990	61,921		14.3%
2000	64,112		3.5%
2010	61,005		−4.8%
2020	72,647		19.1%
2025 (est.)	88,471		21.8%
U.S. Decennial Census

=== Racial and ethnic composition ===
Daytona Beach racial composition (Hispanics excluded from racial categories) (NH = Non-Hispanic)
Race	Pop 2010	Pop 2020	% 2010	% 2020
White (NH)	33,179	37,355	54.39%	51.42%
Black or African American (NH)	21,254	22,945	34.84%	31.58%
Native American or Alaska Native (NH)	185	169	0.30%	0.23%
Asian (NH)	1,354	1,902	2.22%	2.62%
Pacific Islander or Native Hawaiian (NH)	21	36	0.03%	0.05%
Some other race (NH)	144	468	0.24%	0.64%
Two or more races/multiracial (NH)	1,113	3,003	1.82%	4.13%
Hispanic or Latino (any race)	3,755	6,769	6.16%	9.32%
Total	61,005	72,647		

=== 2020 census ===
As of the 2020 census, Daytona Beach had a population of 72,647. The median age was 40.9 years. 15.3% of residents were under the age of 18 and 21.1% of residents were 65 years of age or older. For every 100 females there were 102.3 males, and for every 100 females age 18 and over there were 102.5 males age 18 and over.

95.3% of residents lived in urban areas, while 4.7% lived in rural areas.

There were 31,170 households in Daytona Beach, of which 19.0% had children under the age of 18 living in them. Of all households, 27.7% were married-couple households, 27.3% were households with a male householder and no spouse or partner present, and 36.1% were households with a female householder and no spouse or partner present. About 39.7% of all households were made up of individuals and 16.1% had someone living alone who was 65 years of age or older.

There were 38,671 housing units, of which 19.4% were vacant. The homeowner vacancy rate was 3.4% and the rental vacancy rate was 10.8%.

=== 2010 census ===
As of the 2010 United States census, 61,005 people, 25,093 households, and 12,234 families lived in the city.

=== 2000 census ===
As of 2000, 18.0% had children under 18 living with them, 30.1% were married couples living together, 14.5% had a female householder with no husband present, and 51.6% were not families. Of all households, 39.4% were made up of individuals, and 14.4% had someone living alone who was 65 or older. The average household size was 2.06 and the average family size was 2.77.

In 2000, 17.6% of the population was under 18, 16.6% was from 18 to 24, 25.6% from 25 to 44, 20.5% from 45 to 64, and 19.7% was 65 or older. The median age was 37 years. For every 100 females, there were 99.7 males. For every 100 females age 18 and over, there were 98.5 males.

In 2000, the median income for a household in the city was $25,439, and for a family was $33,514. Males had a median income of $25,705 versus $20,261 for females. The per capita income for the city was $17,530. 23.6% of the population and 16.9% of families were below the poverty line. Of the total population, 34.9% of those under 18 and 12.1% of those 65 and older were living below the poverty line.

=== Languages ===
As of 2000, English spoken as a first language accounted for 90.37% of all residents, and 9.62% spoke other languages as their first language. Spanish speakers made up 4.01% of the population; French was the third-most spoken language, which made up 0.90%; German was at 0.86%; and Arabic was at 0.66% of the population.

== Economy ==
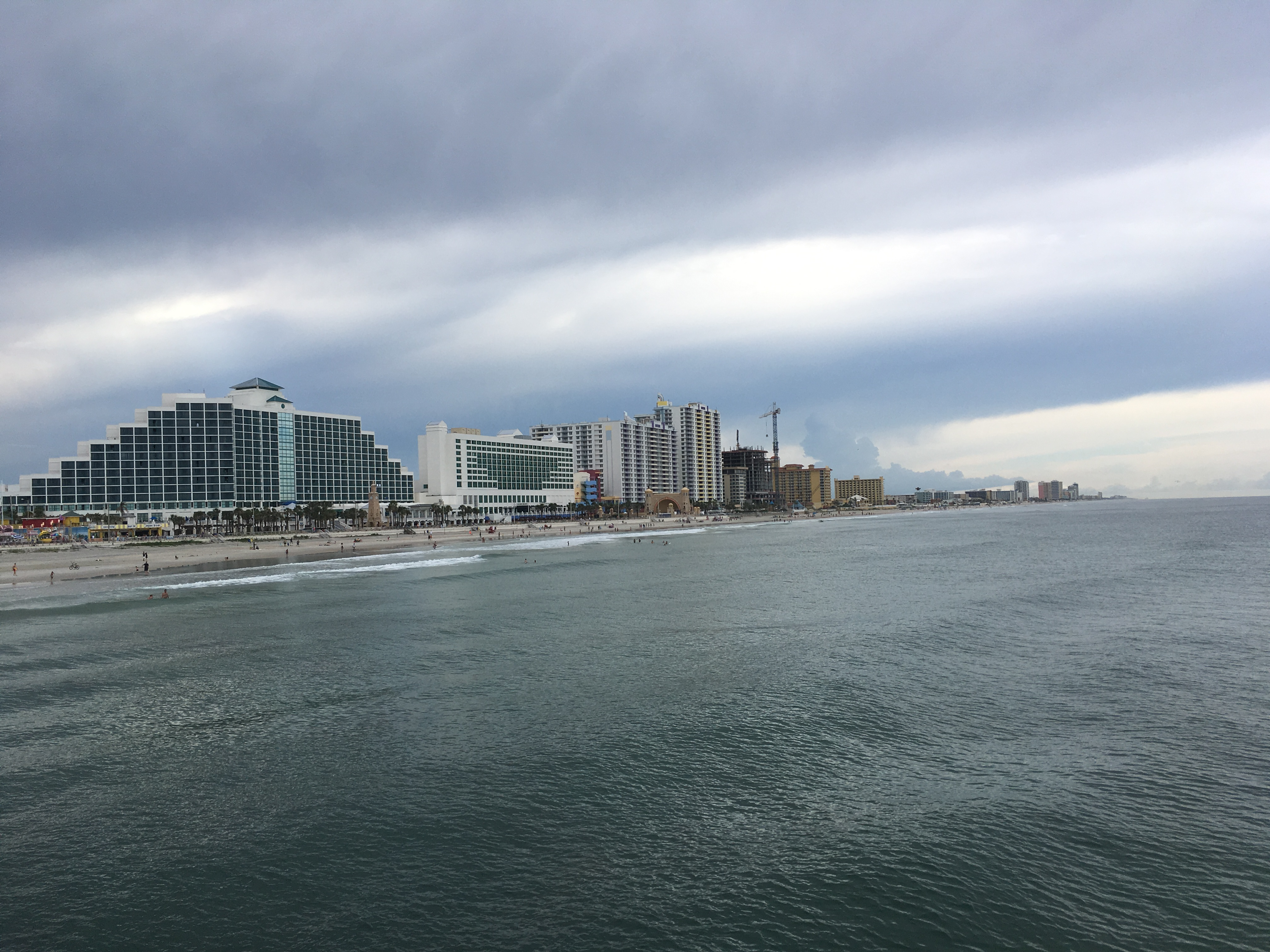
Daytona Beach looking north from the pier

Tourism is a major part of the Daytona Beach economy, with over 8 million visitors in 2004. Other sources of revenue include manufacturing, and Daytona Beach has industrial sites within an enterprise zone and sites within a foreign trade zone adjacent to Daytona Beach International Airport.

Companies and organizations that have their corporate headquarters or a major presence in the area include:

- Brown & Brown
- Halifax Health
- Halifax Media Group
- International Speedway Corporation
- Gambro-Renal Products
- Ladies Professional Golf Association
- NASCAR
- Embry-Riddle Aeronautical University

=== Shopping ===
- Volusia Mall, the largest shopping mall in Daytona Beach
- Ocean Walk Shoppes, an open-air shopping center
- Tanger Outlets, a 380,000 ft^{2} (35,000 m^{2}) retail center

=== Top employers ===
According to the city's 2019 Comprehensive Annual Financial Report, the top employers in the city are:

#	Employer	# of Employees
1	Volusia County School District	7,623
2	Halifax Health	4,050
3	Volusia County, Florida	3,408
4	AdventHealth Daytona Beach	2,288
5	Embry-Riddle Aeronautical University	2,003
6	Daytona State College	1,250
7	The City of Daytona Beach, Florida	921
8	Bethune–Cookman University	843
9	Florida Hospital Healthcare Partner	697
10	SMA Healthcare	677

== Arts and culture ==
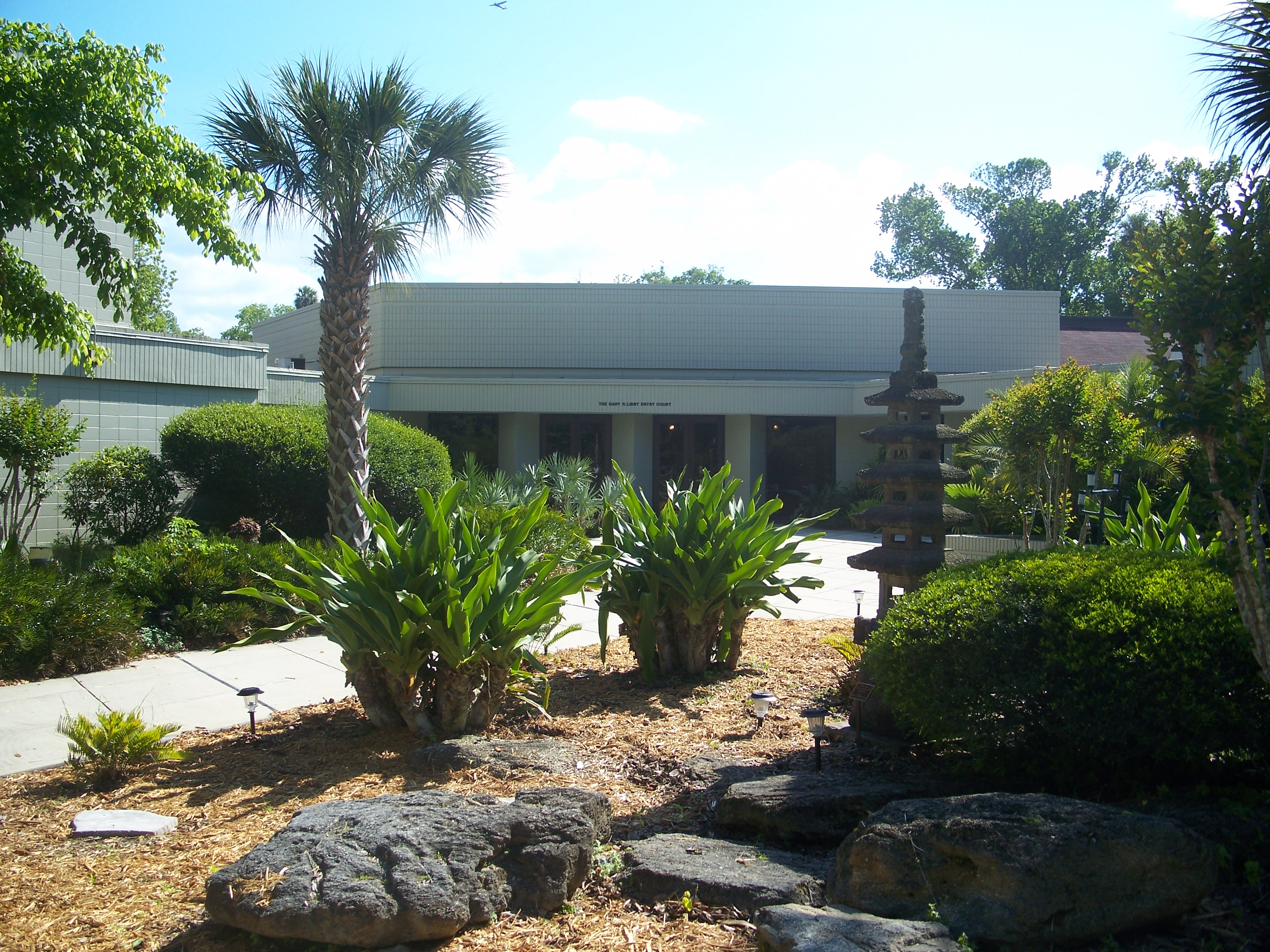
Museum of Arts and Sciences

The Museum of Arts and Sciences is the primary cultural facility for Daytona Beach and Volusia County. Other museums located in the city include the Southeast Museum of Photography and the Halifax Historical Museum. The Museum of Arts and Sciences is actually a collection of museums and galleries, and includes the Klancke Environmental Complex, the Cuban Museum, the Root Family Museum featuring one of the largest Coca-Cola collections in the world, the Dow American Gallery, and the Bouchelle Center for Decorative Arts, which together form what is probably one of the finest collections of furniture and decorative arts in the Southeast. It also includes the Cici and Hyatt Brown Museum of Art, which houses the largest collection of Florida art in the world. The exhibitions change often, and a children's science center opened in 2008. Since 1952, the nonprofit Daytona Beach Symphony Society has sponsored performances by U.S. and international orchestras, opera, and dance companies each season at the Peabody Auditorium.

=== Special events ===
The city attracts over 8 million tourists each year. Special events that draw visitors to Daytona Beach include:

- Speedweeks, Held in February (Daytona 500 NASCAR race, Rolex 24 sports car race, and others)
- Coke Zero Sugar 400, NASCAR race held on the last Saturday of August (formerly called the Pepsi 400 and the Firecracker 400)
- Daytona Beach Bike Week Daytona 200 motorcycle races, bike shows, and biker reunion in March
- National Cheerleaders Association collegiate national championships held each April
- Spring break (date varies, usually the first and second week of March)

During motorcycle events (Bike Week and Biketoberfest), several hundred thousand bikers from all over the world visit the greater Daytona Beach area. The city is also often associated with spring break, though the efforts of the local government to discourage rowdiness, combined with the rise of other spring-break destinations, have affected Daytona's preeminence as a spring-break destination. It is the destination of Dayton 2 Daytona, an annual event that draws over 3,000 University of Dayton college students since 1977.

=== National Historic Places ===
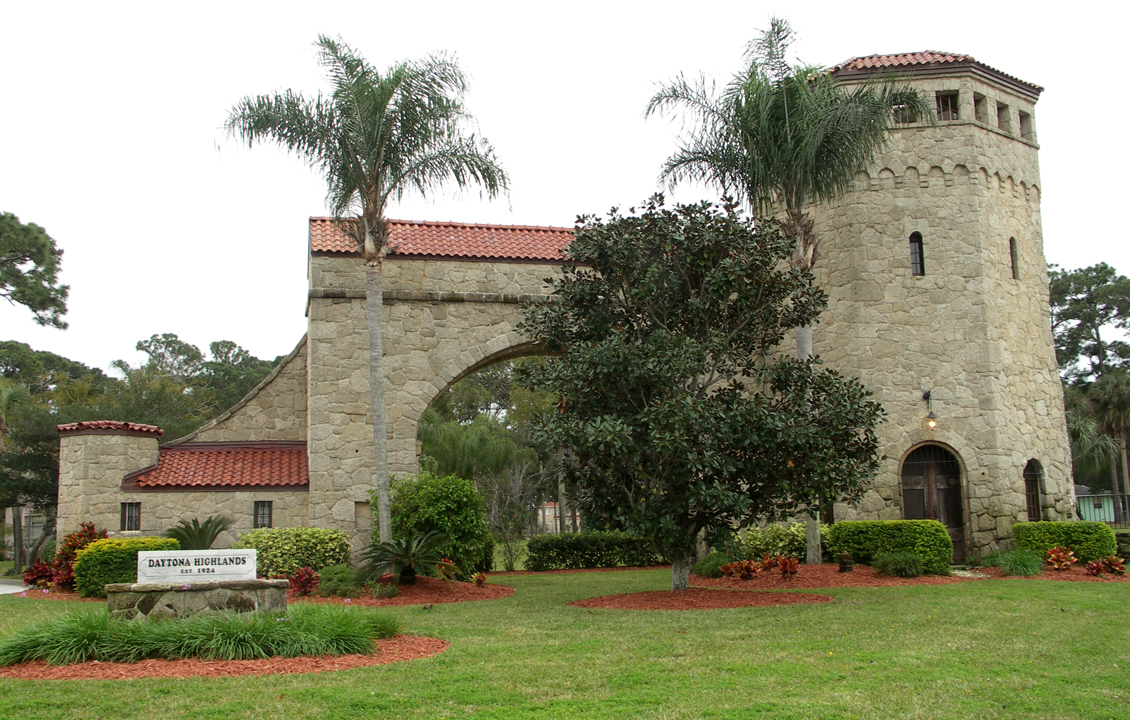
Tarragona Arch

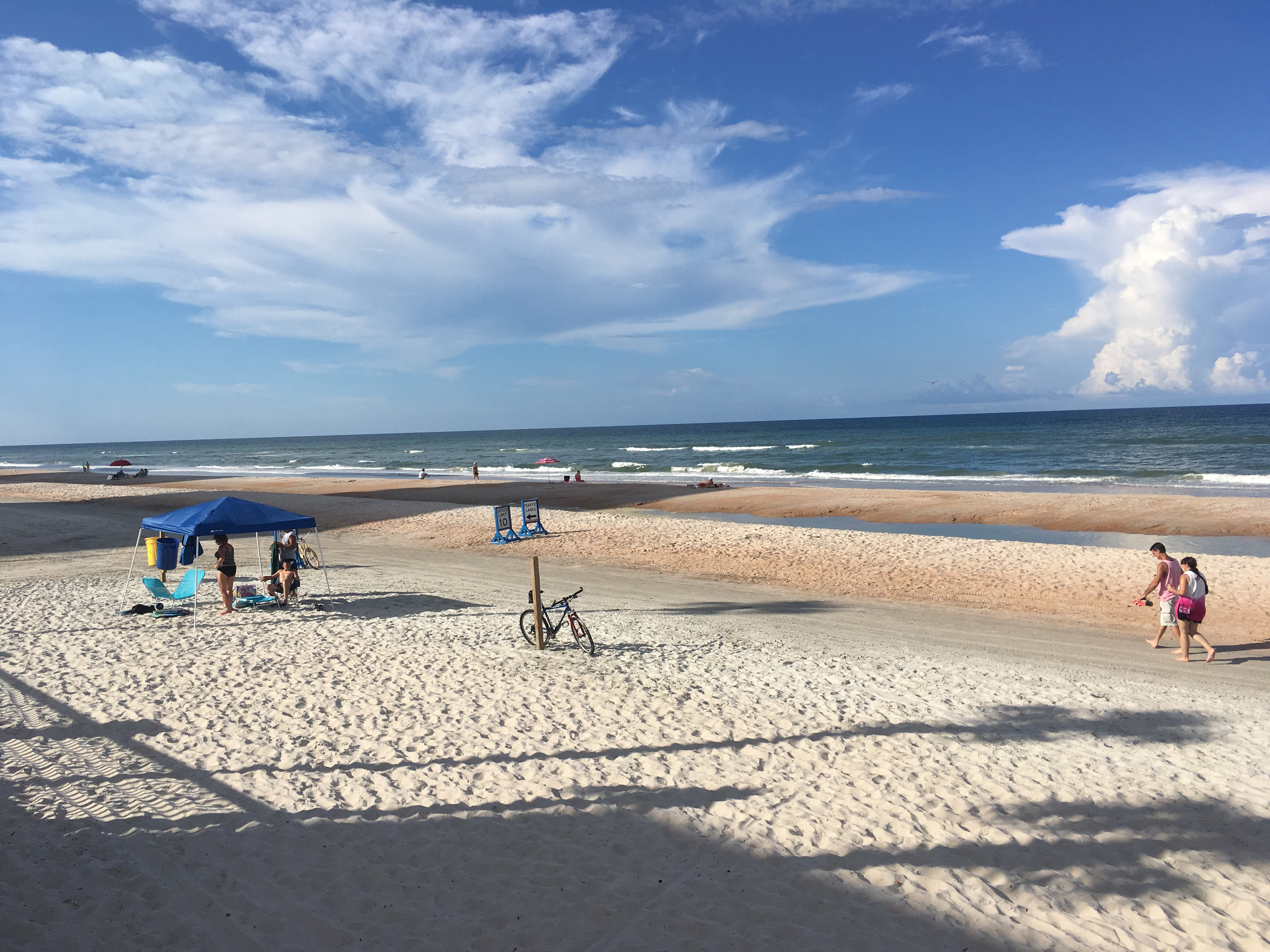
The beach in Daytona Beach near the border with Ormond Beach

=== Other points of interest ===
- Daytona 500 Experience
- Daytona International Speedway
- Daytona Beach Boardwalk
- Daytona Lagoon Water Park
- Halifax Historical Museum
- Jackie Robinson Ballpark
- Main Street Pier
- Mary McLeod Bethune Performing Arts Center and Visual Arts Gallery
- Museum of Arts and Sciences
- News Journal Center
- Southeast Museum of Photography
- The Ocean Center

== Sports ==
The start of the 2015 Daytona 500 at Daytona International Speedway

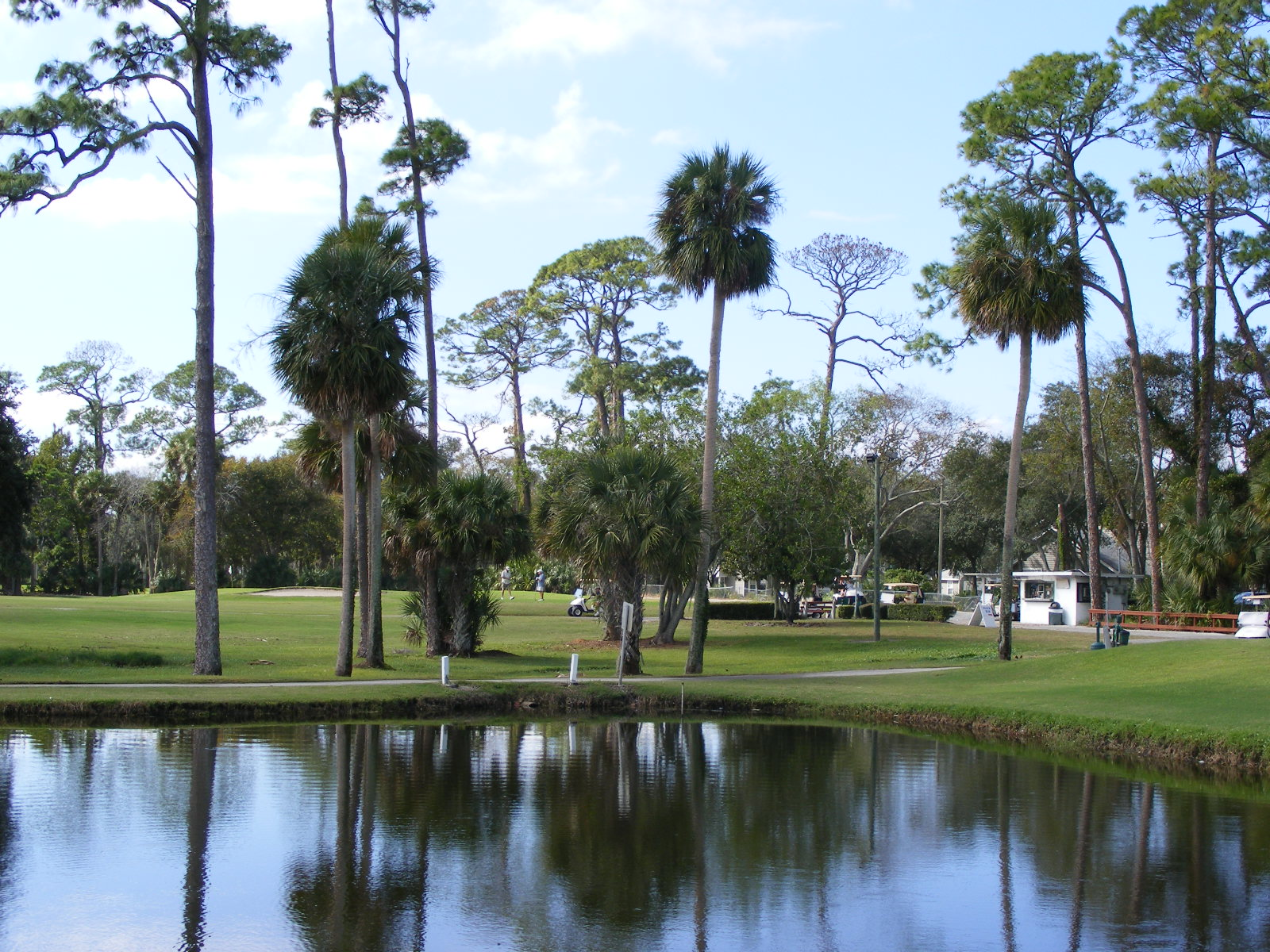
Daytona Beach Golf Course, South Course

=== Motorsports ===
Daytona Beach is home to Daytona International Speedway, one of the most prestigious motorsport venues in America, the track annually hosts the Daytona 500 (and the Duels), NASCAR's season opening race and its largest race, as well as the Coke Zero Sugar 400, which is NASCAR's regular season finale, the track held NASCAR races on its infield road course in 2020 and 2021, and hosts races in the O'Reilly, Truck, and ARCA Series.

Alongside NASCAR, the track also hosts the 24 Hours of Daytona, which is part of the triple crown of endurance racing, the event is sanctioned by IMSA.

=== Baseball ===
The Daytona Tortugas, a minor league baseball team of the Florida State League, play at Jackie Robinson Ballpark. Established in 1993, the team has won six championships.

== Parks and recreation ==
=== Beaches and parks ===
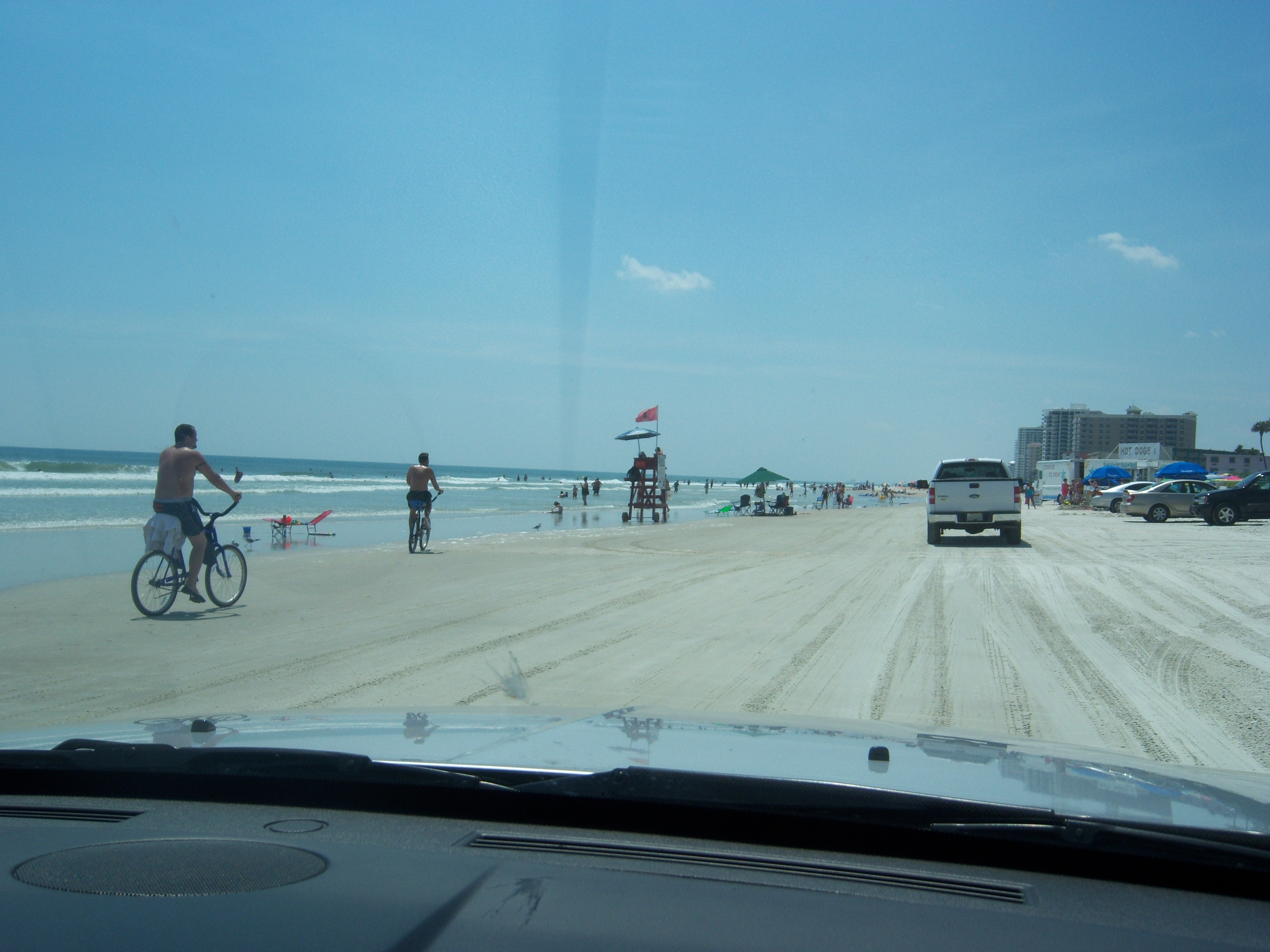
Driving on the packed sand at Daytona Beach

Daytona Beach has over 23 miles (37 km) of public beaches, and more than ten waterfront parks. Cars can be driven on some of the beaches.

Notable golf courses include Daytona Beach Golf Course, established in 1922, and LPGA International.

== Government ==
=== Local government ===
Under Daytona Beach's commission-manager form of government, voters elect a city commission, which consists of seven members who serve four-year, staggered terms. Six are elected by district, the mayor is elected citywide.

The city commission establishes ordinances and policies for the city. It also reviews and approves the city budget annually. The commission appoints a city manager, who carries out the will of the commission and handles day-to-day business.

=== Federal, state, and county representation ===
The United States Postal Service operates a post office at 500 Bill France Boulevard in Daytona Beach.

The Daytona Beach Armed Forces Reserve Center is home of the Florida Army National Guard 1st Battalion, 265th Air Defense Artillery Regiment, Headquarters and Headquarters Battery, Battery D.

Daytona Beach is part of Florida's 6th congressional district. It is part of Florida's 25th and 26th State House of Representatives Districts and the 6th and 8th State Senate Districts.

Florida's 6th congressional district, which extends from the southern Jacksonville suburbs to New Smyrna Beach and includes St. Augustine and Daytona Beach.

== Education ==
=== Primary and secondary schooling ===
Public primary and secondary education is handled by Volusia County Schools. Daytona Beach has two traditional public high schools, two middle schools, and six elementary schools. Some of the larger private schools include Father Lopez Catholic High School.

==== Elementary schools ====
- Beachside Elementary
- Champion Elementary
- Palm Terrace Elementary
- R.J. Longstreet Elementary
- Turie T. Small Elementary
- Westside Elementary

==== Middle schools ====
- Campbell Middle School
- David C. Hinson Middle School

==== High schools ====
- Mainland High School
- Seabreeze High School

=== Colleges and universities ===
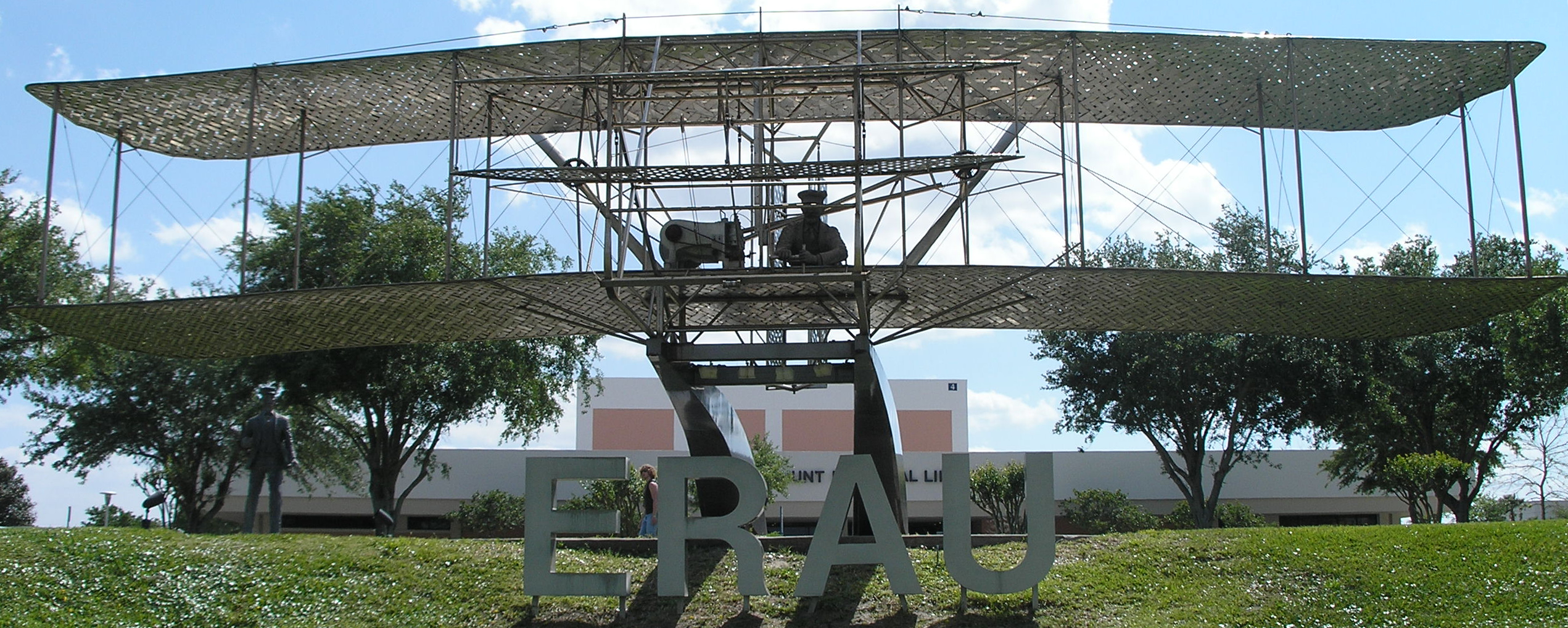
The life-sized Wright Flyer statue is located at the Daytona Beach campus of Embry-Riddle Aeronautical University.

- Bethune–Cookman University
- Daytona State College
- Embry–Riddle Aeronautical University
- University of Central Florida, Daytona Beach Campus

=== Vocational schools ===
- The Airline Academy offers flight training for pilots and other airline professionals.
- Keiser College
- Phoenix East Aviation offers flight training for pilots.
- WyoTech (formerly AMI) offers motorcycle repair and marine repair training.

== Media ==
=== Newspapers ===
- The Daytona Beach News-Journal – daily newspaper covering the Halifax area
- Hometown News – weekly newspaper covering the greater Daytona Beach area
- East Coast Current – community newspaper covering Volusia County
- Orlando Sentinel – newspaper and news site based in Orlando, with a bureau covering Daytona Beach and Volusia County
- The Avion Newspaper – student college publication of Embry–Riddle Aeronautical University in Daytona Beach.
- The Daytona Times – Black newspaper covering Daytona Beach metropolitan area
- HeadlineSurfer.com – Internet-only newspaper covering the greater Daytona Beach - Orlando area

=== Radio ===
AM

- WNDB, 1150 AM, Daytona Beach, news/Talk/Sports
- WROD, 1340 AM, Daytona Beach, classic rock
- WMFJ, 1450 AM, Daytona Beach, religious
- WDJZ, 1590 AM, Daytona Beach, adult contemporary/news/talk

FM

- WHOG-FM, 95.7 FM, Ormond Beach, classic rock
- WCFB, 94.5 FM, Daytona Beach, urban adult contemporary
- WJHM, 101.9 FM, Daytona Beach, classic hip hop
- WIKD-LP, 102.5 FM, Daytona Beach, campus radio of Embry–Riddle Aeronautical University
- W231CN, 94.1 FM, Daytona Beach, urban contemporary "HOT 94.1"

=== Television ===
- WESH, Channel 2, digital channel 11, NBC
- WDSC-TV, Channel 15, digital channel 24, educational independent
- Spectrum News 13, Spectrum Cable, cable channel 13

== Infrastructure ==
=== Law enforcement ===
Daytona Beach’s law enforcement operations are done by the Daytona Beach Police Department (DBPD), which is headed by Police Chief Jakari Young, who has 241 sworn personnel. The police force was criticized for having its members sell T-shirts from its headquarters that had the slogan “Scumbag Eradication Team: Not in Our Town” on them to fund its Police Explorer program.

The T-shirts contain a caricature of retired Chief Chitwood standing next to a toilet bowl with the legs of multiple individuals sticking out. The T-shirt has been cited in at least one lawsuit against the DBPD alleging police brutality; the lawyer in the case in which the client sustained broken ribs and a fractured eye socket during an arrest for an open container of beer, claims the T-shirt shows the DBPD condones violence.

The Volusia County Sheriff's Office, headed by Mike Chitwood, is a county-wide law enforcement agency with 446 sworn positions, 438 civilian employees, 300 volunteers, and an annual operating budget of $73 million that has jurisdiction in unincorporated areas of Volusia County and provides additional law enforcement support to Daytona Beach during such events as the Daytona 500 and aids in joint investigations of certain crimes.

The Volusia County Beach Patrol provides law enforcement and EMT services along Volusia County beaches, including the beaches in the city of Daytona Beach.

=== Healthcare ===
Healthcare in Daytona Beach is dominated by Halifax Health (formerly known as Halifax Hospital). The Halifax Hospital Taxing District was established in 1927 by an act of the Florida Legislature as a public hospital district. Dozens of individual practitioners and professional associations are in the Daytona Beach area.

=== Utilities ===
Basic utilities in Daytona Beach (water and sewer) are provided by the city government.

- Florida Power & Light is Daytona Beach's local electric power provider.
- TECO/People's Gas is Daytona Beach's natural gas provider. Peoples Gas
- Spectrum and AT&T networks are Daytona Beach's local cable providers.
- AT&T (formerly BellSouth) is Daytona Beach's local phone provider.

The city has a successful recycling program with separate pickups for garbage, yard waste, and recycling. Collection is provided by several private companies under contract to Volusia County.

=== Transportation ===
==== Airports ====
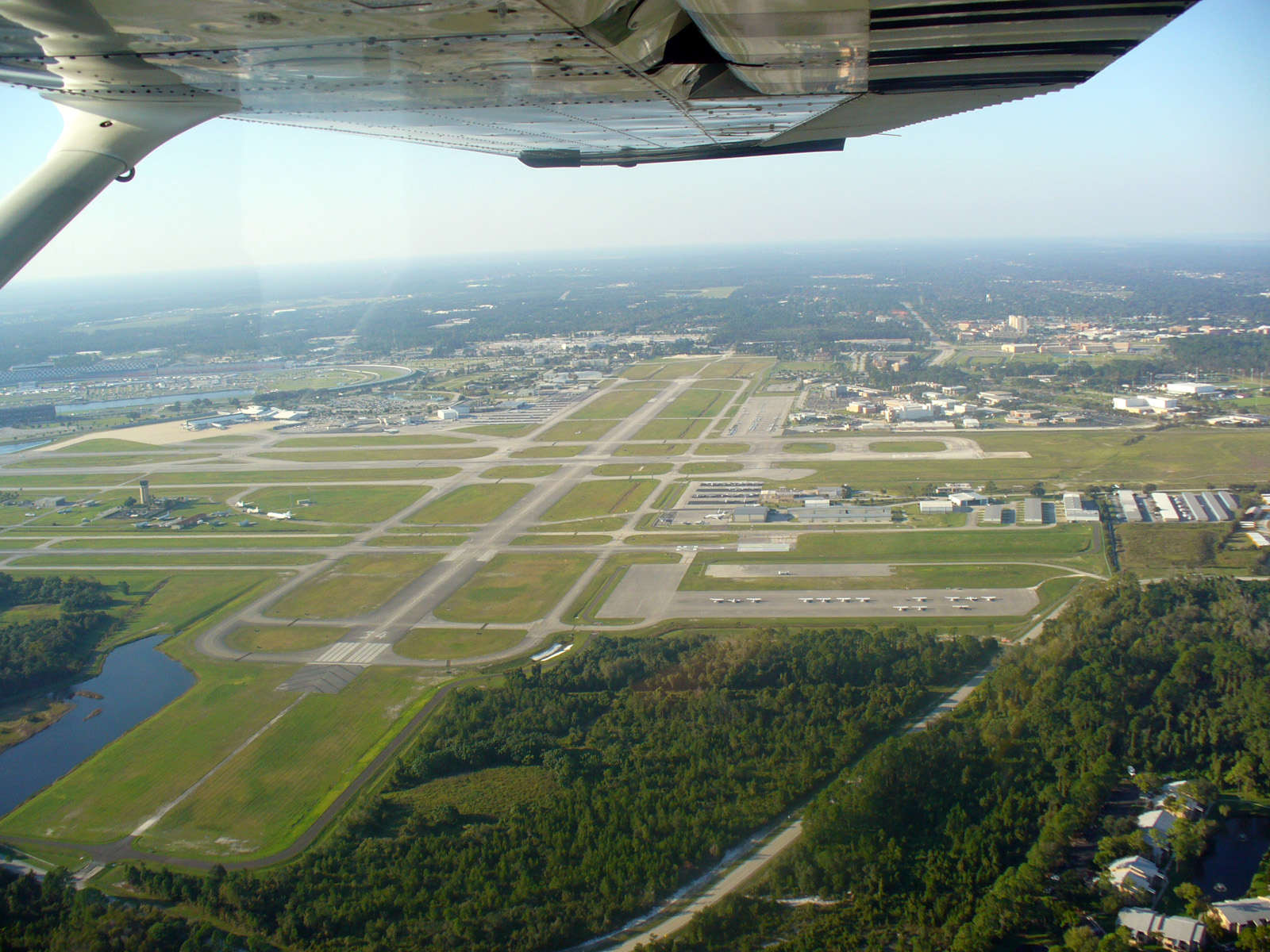
Aerial view of Daytona Beach International Airport

Passenger airline services are located at Daytona Beach International Airport (DAB), which is centrally located within the city adjacent to Daytona International Speedway. The site was first used as an airport with terminals being constructed in 1952 and 1958. The present facility was constructed in 1992 at the cost of $46 million, and includes both a domestic terminal and an International terminal. Despite the new facilities, DAB has found difficulty in attracting and retaining carriers; Continental Airlines, AirTran Airways, and United Airlines discontinued flights to Daytona in 2007 and 2008. LTU and American Airlines also serviced Daytona Beach during the 1980s and 1990s, both of which ended all flights in 1994 and 1997, respectively.

Current passenger airlines serving DAB include Delta Air Lines (with nonstop service to Atlanta) and American Airlines (with nonstop service to Charlotte). Both carriers offer connecting service from those cities to destinations worldwide. International flights from DAB fly to destinations in the Bahamas through air taxi and charter services Airgate Aviation and IslandPass; non-stop flights are available from DAB to Marsh Harbour, Treasure Cay, and North Eleuthera. Sunwing Airlines also operates seasonal flights from Toronto Pearson International Airport. DAB is also heavily used for general aviation, largely due to Embry–Riddle Aeronautical University, whose campus is located at the airport.

Larger airports nearby are Orlando International Airport and Jacksonville International Airport, each of which is about 90 minutes away.

==== Buses ====
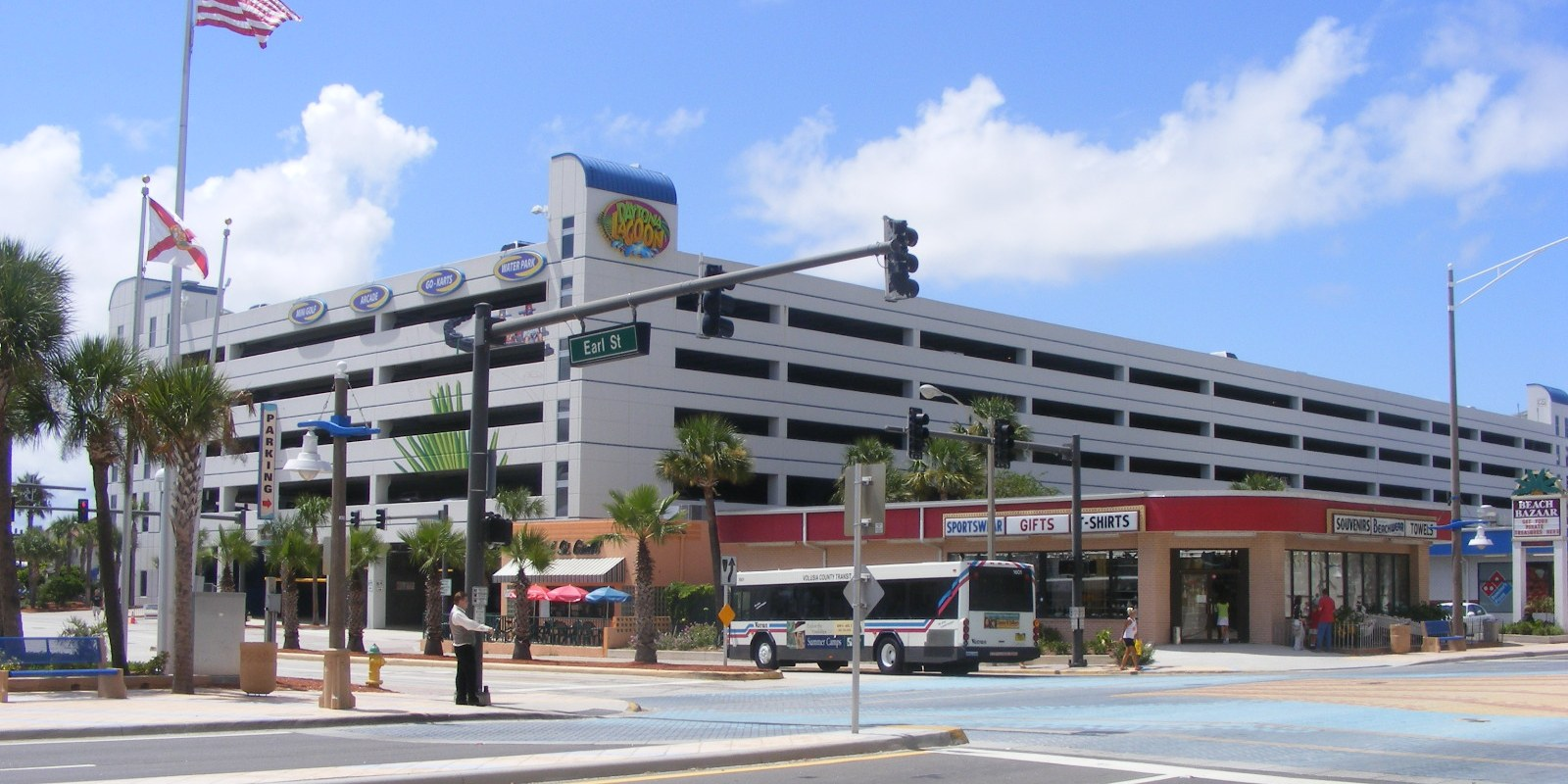
The Volusia County Parking Garage in Daytona Beach provides a place for visitors to park and walk around.

- Daytona Beach is served by Greyhound Bus Lines, which has a terminal located at 138 South Ridgewood Avenue (US 1). The Greyhound routes from Daytona Beach connect with hubs in Jacksonville and Orlando.
- Votran is the local bus service provided by Volusia County.

==== Automobiles ====
Daytona Beach is easily accessible by I-95 that runs north and south and I-4 connecting Daytona Beach with Orlando and Tampa. US 1 (Ridgewood Avenue) also passes north–south through Daytona Beach. Connecting I-4 and US1 is SR 400. US 92 (International Speedway Boulevard) runs east–west through Daytona Beach. SR A1A is a scenic north–south route along the beach.

The Volusia County Parking Garage is located at 701 Earl Street at North Atlantic Avenue (SR A1A). The garage is strategically located, next to the Ocean Center, Daytona Lagoon, and across the street from the Hilton Hotel and Ocean Walk Shoppes. Over 1000 parking spaces are available inside the garage, which also houses an intermodal transfer station for VoTran.

==== Bridges ====
Four bridges cross over the Halifax River (and Intracoastal Waterway) at Daytona Beach. They include (starting from furthest downstream) the Veterans Memorial Bridge (which carries CR 4050 traffic), the Broadway Bridge (which carries US 92 traffic), the Main Street Bridge (which carries CR 4040 traffic), and the Seabreeze Bridge (which carries SR 430 traffic). All four bridges charge no toll to traffic. In June, 2016, the Veterans Memorial Bridge was closed as part of a three-year project to demolish the drawbridge and replace it with a high span bridge.

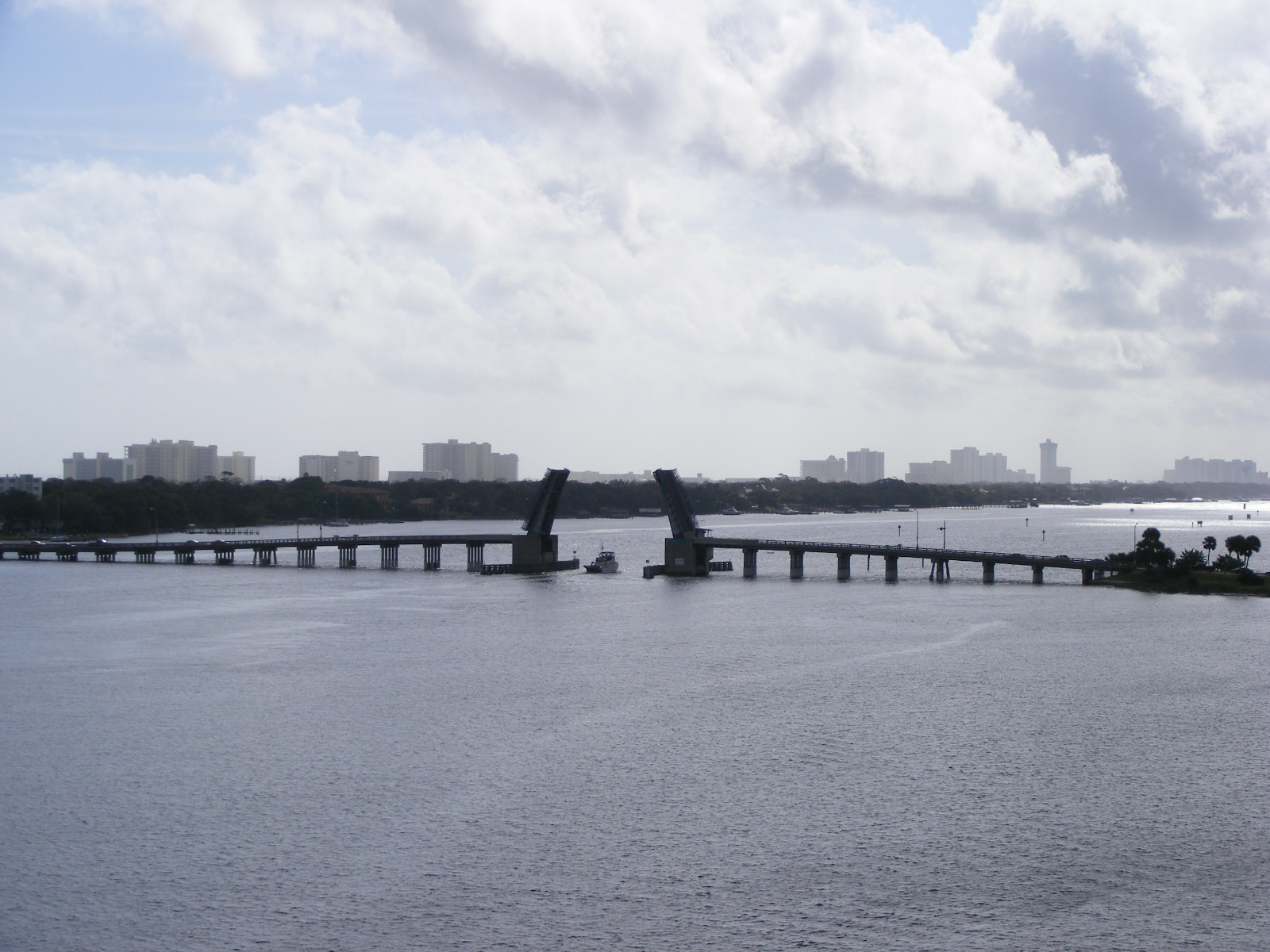
Veterans Memorial Bridge

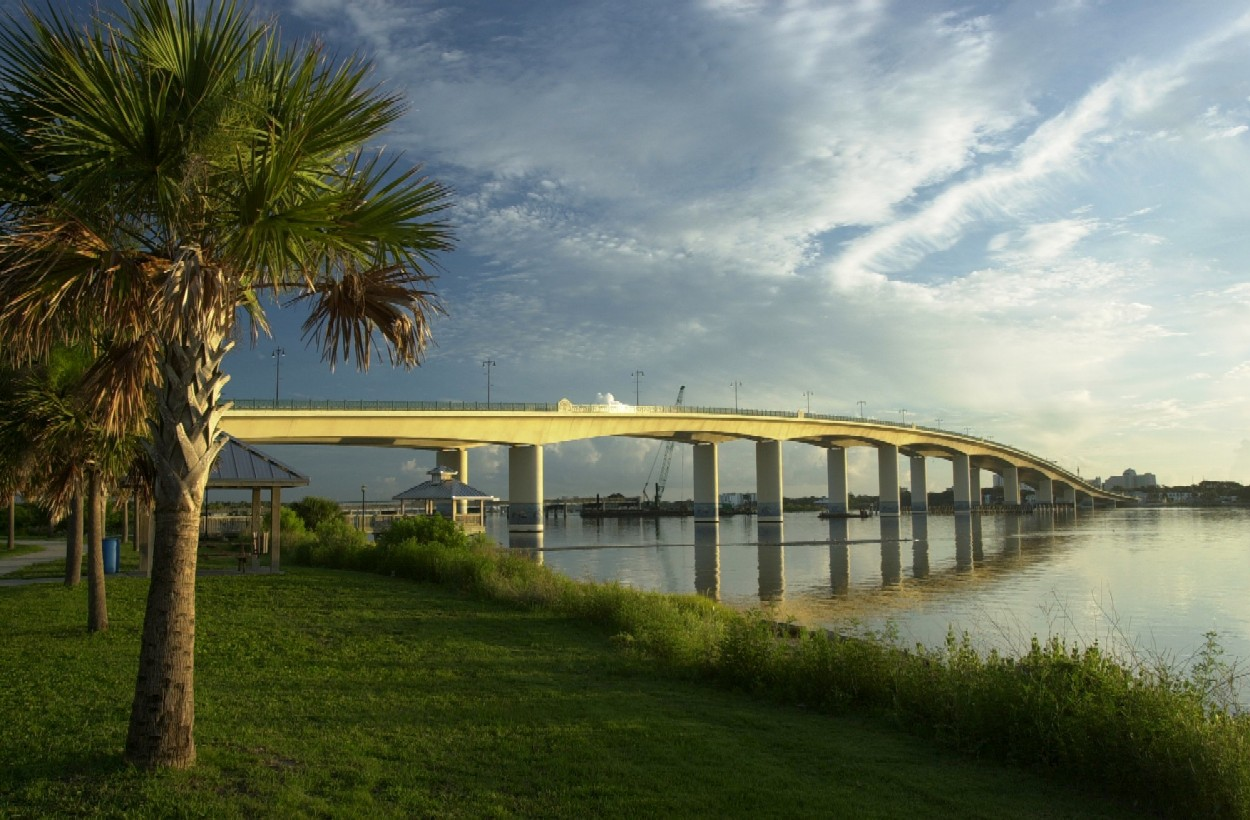
Broadway Bridge

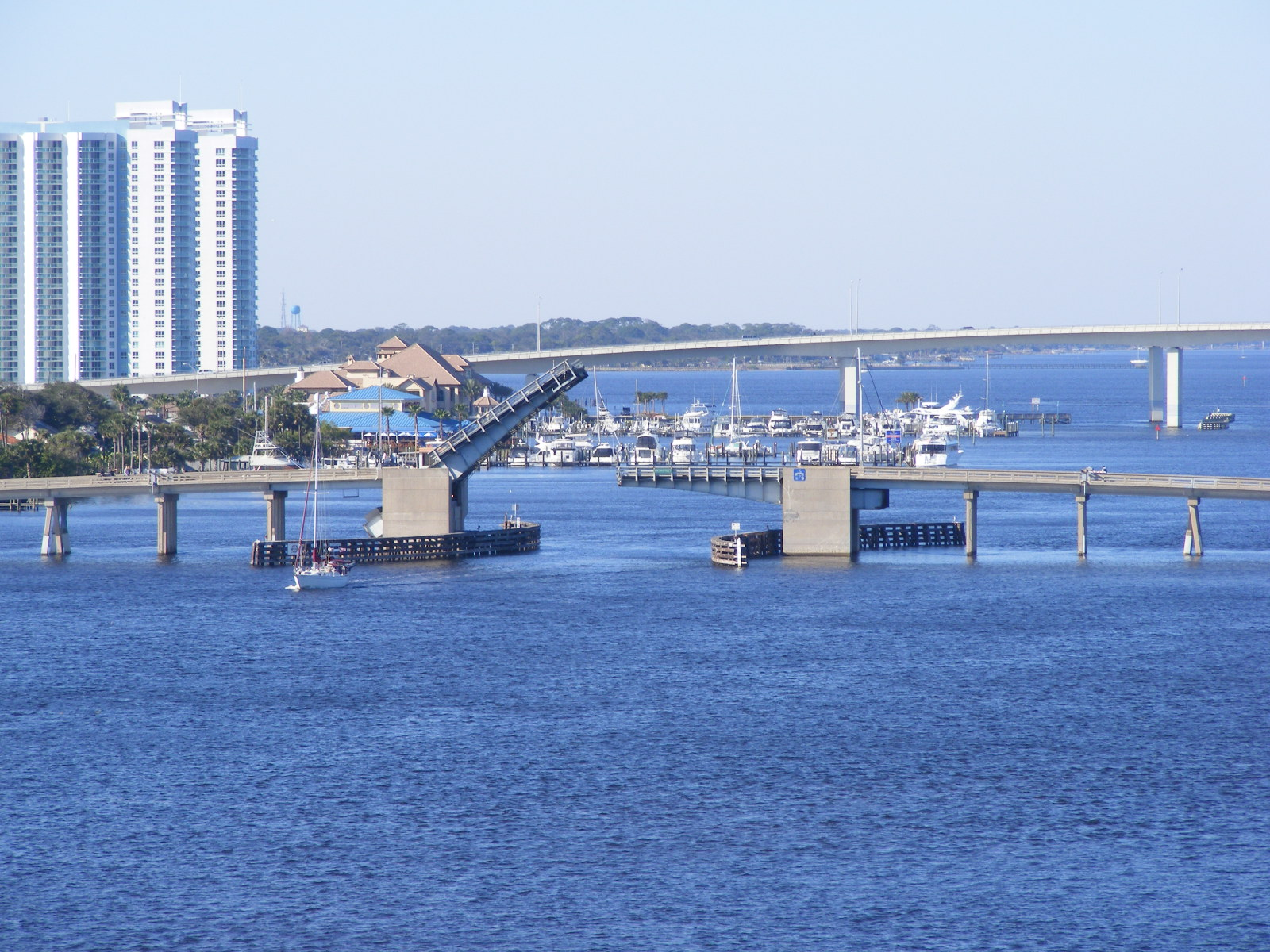
Main Street Bridge

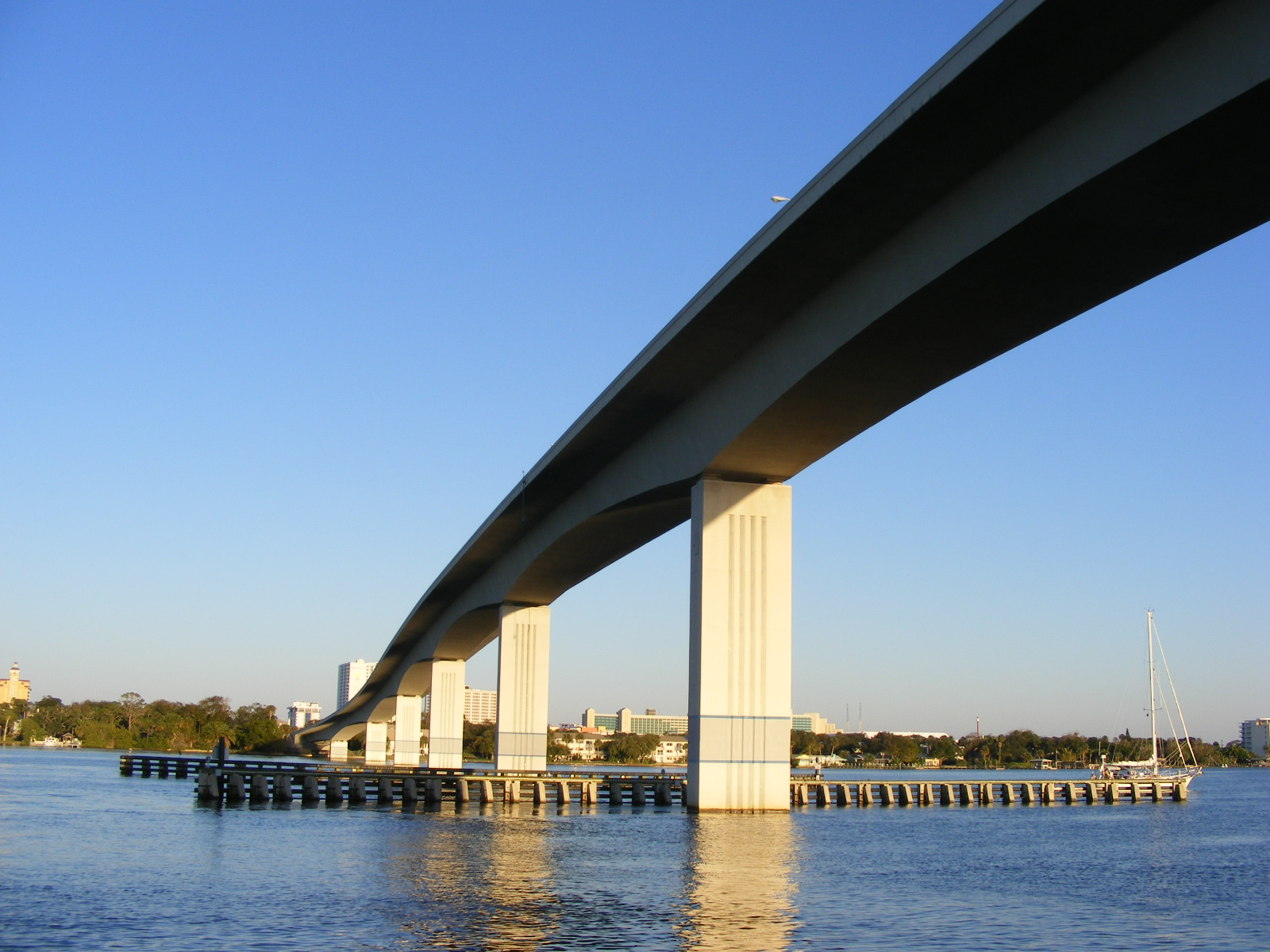
Seabreeze Bridge

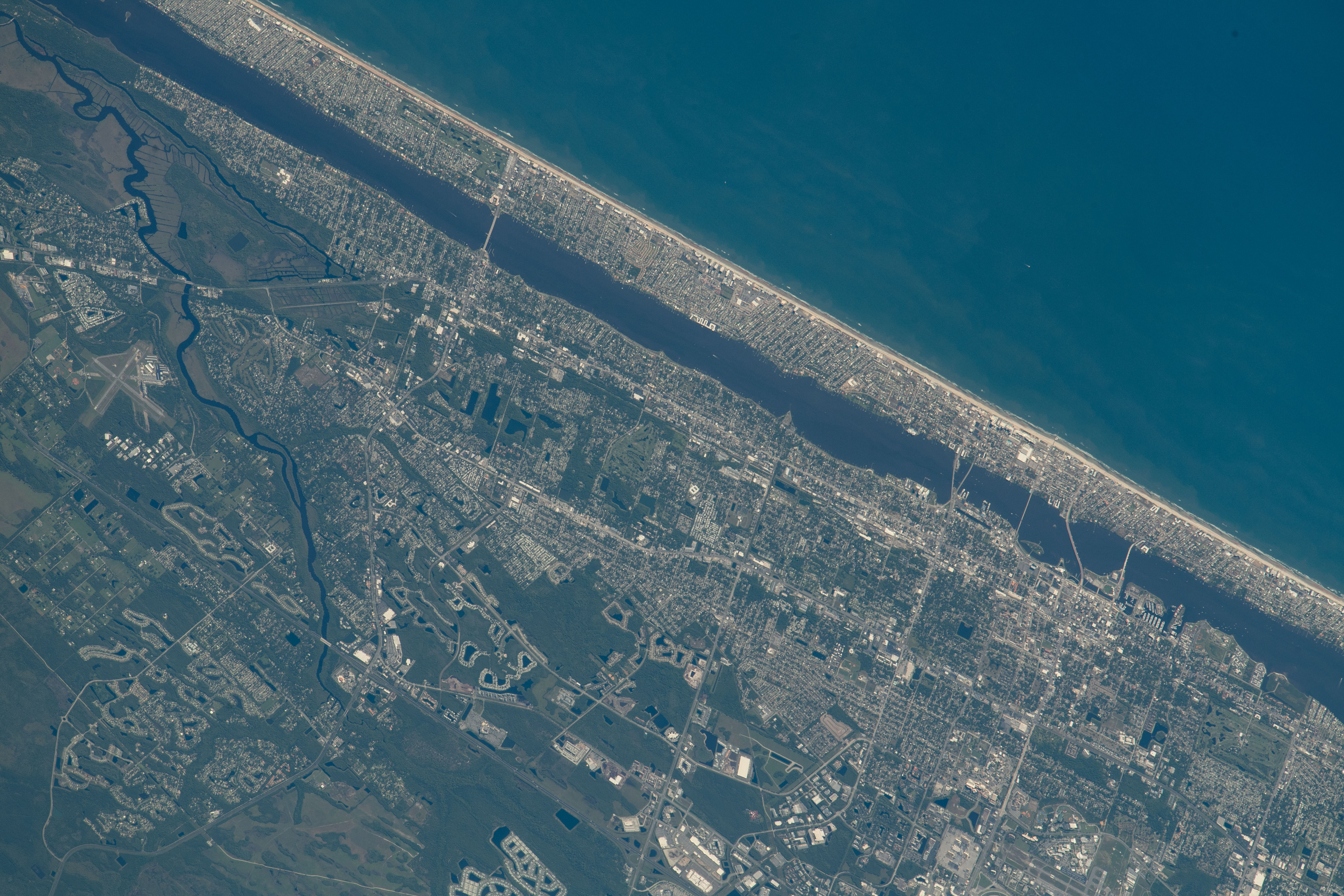
Bridges over the Halifax River on July 4, 2022; taken from the International Space Station

==== Rail ====
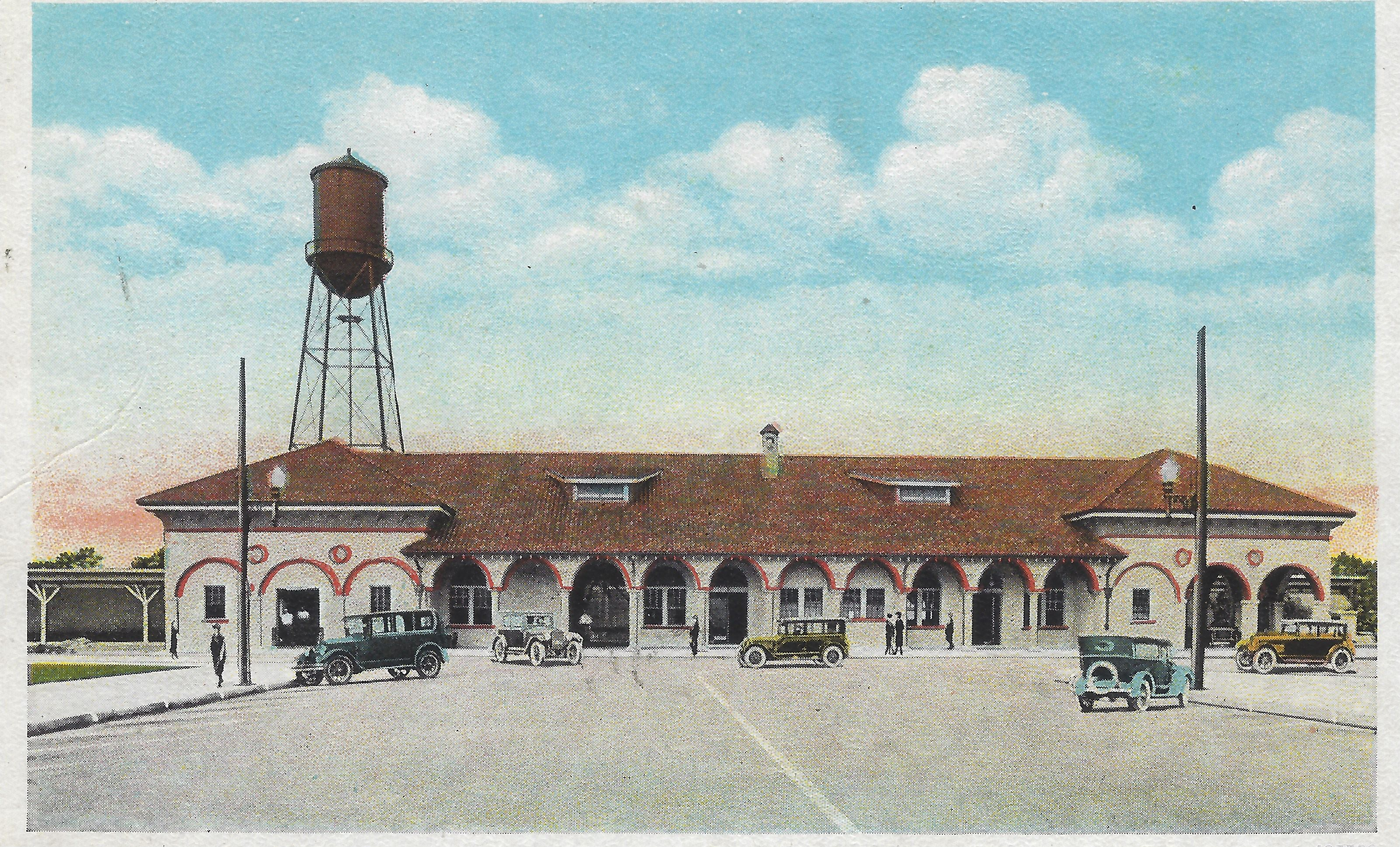
Daytona Beach railroad station, circa 1926

Passenger railroad service to Daytona Beach was established no later than 1889 by the Jacksonville, St. Augustine and Halifax River Railway, predecessor of the Florida East Coast Railroad. Long-distance trains such as the City of Miami and the South Wind (both from Chicago), East Coast Champion (from New York City) and the Havana Special (New York City) made stops at Daytona Beach. Long-distance routes were diverted to Atlantic Coast Line Railroad and Seaboard Air Line Railroad routes on the Florida interior south of the Jacksonville Union Station, following the beginning of a labor dispute on the FEC in 1963. Passenger trains continued calling at Daytona Beach until July 31, 1968, when the FEC terminated passenger operations system-wide. The FEC currently operates freight trains through Daytona Beach.

== Notable people ==
- Duane Allman and Gregg Allman, musicians
- Perry Baker, rugby player for the U.S. national team
- Fulgencio Batista, 19th President of Cuba
- Pete Carr, musician
- Vince Carter, basketball player, eight-time NBA All-Star
- Ed Charles, Major League Baseball player
- J. A. Coburn, blackface minstrel troupe manager, theater company owner
- Tank Dell, NFL wide receiver
- Dimitri Diatchenko, actor
- Bill France Sr., founder of NASCAR
- Roland G. Fryer Jr., economist, in 2007 at age 30, he became the youngest African American to be given tenure at Harvard University.
- Michael Greenbaum, rabbi and Vice Chancellor of The Jewish Theological Seminary.
- Kenneth C. Griffin, hedge-fund manager, entrepreneur, investor
- Lee H. Hamilton, U.S. congressman representing Indiana
- Danielle Harris, actress
- Austin Hays, baseball outfielder
- Carrenza Howard, baseball pitcher
- Zora Neale Hurston, writer, anthropologist
- Alex Kinsey, singer
- E. J. Kuale, professional football player
- Henry Lehmann (1929–2000), General Manager of General Electric's military systems operations, and philanthropist
- Gary Russell Libby, art historian, curator, and director of the Museum of Arts and Sciences
- Ryan Lochte, swimmer, winner of 12 Olympic medals including six gold
- Martin Mayhew, pro football player and executive
- Mary McLeod Bethune, educator and civil-rights activist
- Walter M. Miller Jr., author of A Canticle for Leibowitz
- Jane Morgan, singer
- Matthew Tyler Musto, musician
- Kevin Nash, professional WWE wrestler
- No Kum-sok, North Korean defector
- Ransom Eli Olds, automobile pioneer
- Pavlina Osta, radio host
- Josef Papp, engineer
- Kitty Pryde, rapper
- Glen "Fireball" Roberts, NASCAR driver
- Bob Ross, artist and television host
- Galen Seaman, lawyer and mayor of Daytona Beach
- David Sholtz, 26th governor of Florida
- Mike Skinner, NASCAR driver
- Lindsey Snell, journalist
- Marc-Aurèle de Foy Suzor-Coté, painter
- Howard Thurman, author and theologian
- Denzel Washington, actor
- Eric Weems, professional football player
- T. K. Wetherell, president of Florida State University
- Leonard Williams, NFL defensive lineman for Seattle Seahawks
- Jacob Winchester, award-winning composer, writer, voice actor, and director
- Robert Wright, musical-theater writer
- Aileen Wuornos, serial killer executed in 2002
- Smokey Yunick, mechanic and motor-racing innovator

== In popular culture ==
Days of Thunder (1990), was partly filmed in Daytona Beach.

The video for the song "Steal My Sunshine" was partly filmed at Daytona Beach.

The song "Daytona Demon" is believed to refer to the city.

== See also ==
- National Register of Historic Places listings in Volusia County, Florida
