= Daytona Beach Golf Course =

Golf course in Florida, United States

Coordinates: 29°11′9.33″N 81°1′1.6″W

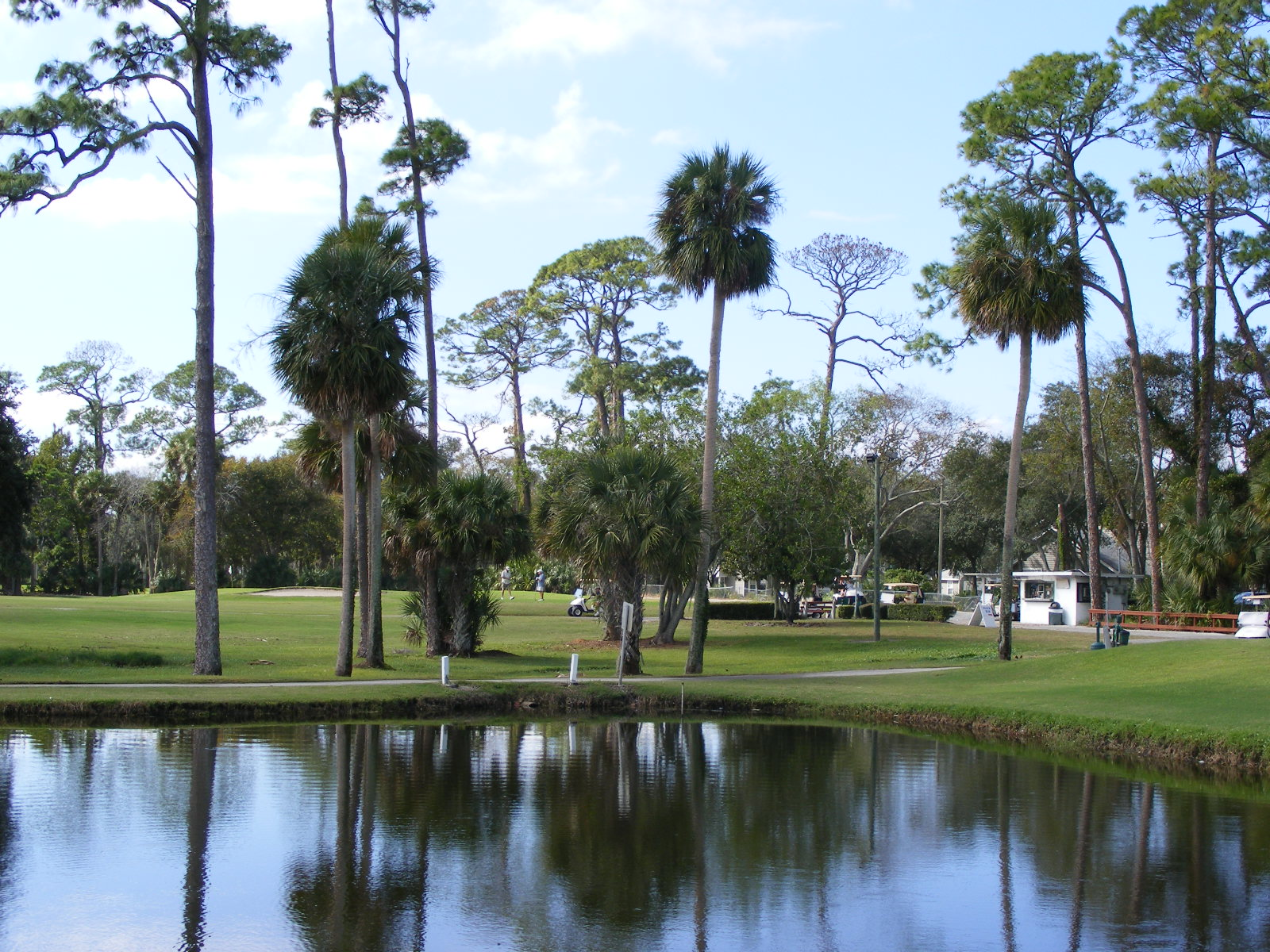
- Interactive map of Daytona Beach Golf Course

Club information
- Location: Daytona Beach, Florida, United States
- Established: 1921
- Type: Public / Municipal
- Owner: City of Daytona Beach
- Operator: City of Daytona Beach
- Tota holes: 36
- Tournaments: Bash at the Beach
- Website: www.daytonabeachgc.com

North Course
- Designed by: Amos "Slim" Deatherage; Lloyd Clifton
- Par: 71
- Length: 6229/5950/5156
- Course rating: 69.8/68.4/69.4

South Course
- Designed by: Donald Ross
- Par: 72
- Length: 6338/5937/5481/4971
- Course rating: 71.8/70.1/67.7/69.1
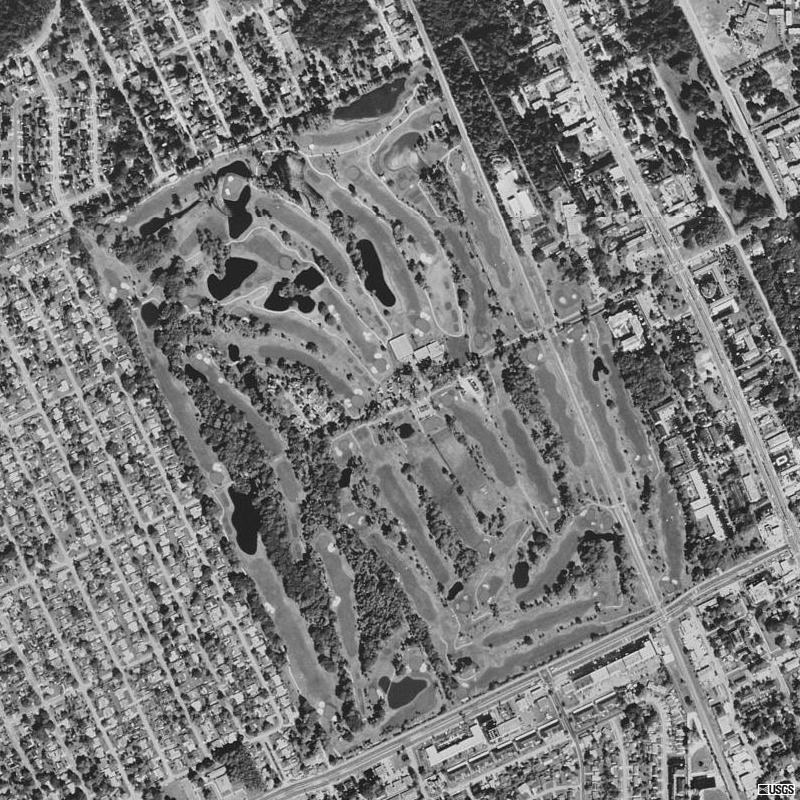
- Aerial view

The Daytona Beach Golf Course is a municipal golf course, located at 600 Wilder Blvd. in Daytona Beach, Florida, United States. The facility is owned and operated by the City of Daytona Beach, and offers two courses, the North Course and the South Course.

== Overview ==
In addition to the two parkland golf courses, the facility offers a lighted driving range, practice putting green, pro shop, and full-service restaurant. The complex is managed by John Cameron as General Manager, with Brian Jaquet as the onsite Golf Professional and Forrest Ensminger as Superintendent. Special programs are offered for Juniors, Ladies, and Seniors.

== History ==
The Daytona Beach Golf Club was constructed in 1921. The South course remains true to the original layout, as designed by Donald Ross, one of the most significant golf course designers in the history of the sport. The course features live oaks, tall pines, and water hazards.

The North course was designed and built in 1966 by Amos "Slim" Deatherage, who was the club's head professional and manager at the time. In 1997 the course was redesigned by Lloyd Clifton, with all greens, bunkers, and tees being redone. The resulting course winds through dense live oak and pine, with more water hazards and more undulations on the greens.

Both courses have been rated as three stars (out of five) on average by Golf Digest magazine readers. GolfLink.com users have also rated both courses at three stars overall.

== Tournaments ==
The Daytona Beach Golf Club is the home of the Embry–Riddle Aeronautical University "Eagles" Women's golf team, who use the courses for practice and intercollegiate matches. The Eagles are members of the National Association of Intercollegiate Athletics Region XIV and compete in the Florida Sun Conference. The Eagles hosted the 2002, 2003, and 2004 NAIA Women's Golf National Championship.

The Eagles women's team also host the annual "Bash at the Beach" golf tournament at Daytona Beach Golf Club. The 2008 tournament was held on the final weekend in March, with participating teams including the Bethune–Cookman University Wildcats, Jackson State University, Birmingham Southern, Seminole Community College, Florida Institute of Technology, University of Mobile, Webber International, Northwood University, Lindenwood University, Wellesley College, Spring Hill College, and Thomas University.

Year	Tournament	Team Winner	Individual Winner
2008	ERAU Bash at the Beach	Bethune–Cookman Wildcats	Carrie Rowe (Webber Int'l)
2007	ERAU Bash at the Beach	Daytona Beach Community College	Albane Flamont (ERAU)
2005	ERAU Bash at the Beach	Daytona Beach Community College	Heidi Lowe (ERAU)
2004	ERAU Bash at the Beach	Barry University	J. Ganthier-Tretault (Webber Int'l)

== Course scorecards ==
South Course
Tee	Rating/Slope	1	2	3	4	5	6	7	8	9	Out	10	11	12	13	14	15	16	17	18	In	Total
SI	Men's	9	15	7	1	11	13	5	3	17		2	14	12	16	4	18	8	6	10
Blue	69.8 / 118	375	186	390	500	350	335	465	424	155	3180	460	353	184	351	194	151	384	390	384	3049	6229
White	68.4 / 116	365	170	340	490	330	325	455	410	140	3025	450	340	175	340	385	130	360	380	365	2925	5950
Par		4	3	4	5	4	4	5	4	3	36	5	4	3	4	4	3	4	4	4	35	71
SI	Women's	15	17	1	11	5	9	3	7	13		2	14	8	16	6	10	4	12	18
Red	69.4 / 116	304	160	292	393	300	310	411	334	132	2636	393	335	133	317	321	111	316	303	291	2520	5156

North Course
Tee	Rating/Slope	1	2	3	4	5	6	7	8	9	Out	10	11	12	13	14	15	16	17	18	In	Total
SI	Men's	11	15	5	1	13	17	9	3	7		6	16	14	10	18	8	12	2	4
Blue	71.8 / 137	338	178	400	526	316	152	375	485	386	3156	426	170	318	378	163	405	327	472	523	3182	6338
White	70.1 / 129	303	160	378	475	290	131	355	468	359	2919	402	165	293	359	155	374	311	444	515	3018	5937
Gold	M:67.7/124 W:72.4/129	289	136	352	450	267	119	337	436	344	2730	375	145	263	333	140	359	293	415	428	2751	5481
Par		4	3	4	5	4	3	4	5	4	36	4	3	4	4	3	4	4	5	5	36	72
SI	Women's	13	15	1	11	7	17	9	3	5		10	18	14	8	16	4	6	2	12
Red	69.1 / 117	270	105	316	422	243	105	303	404	320	2488	332	130	215	306	126	326	278	367	403	2483	4971
