= Ocean Walk Shoppes =

Ocean Walk Shoppes, Restaurants and Entertainment
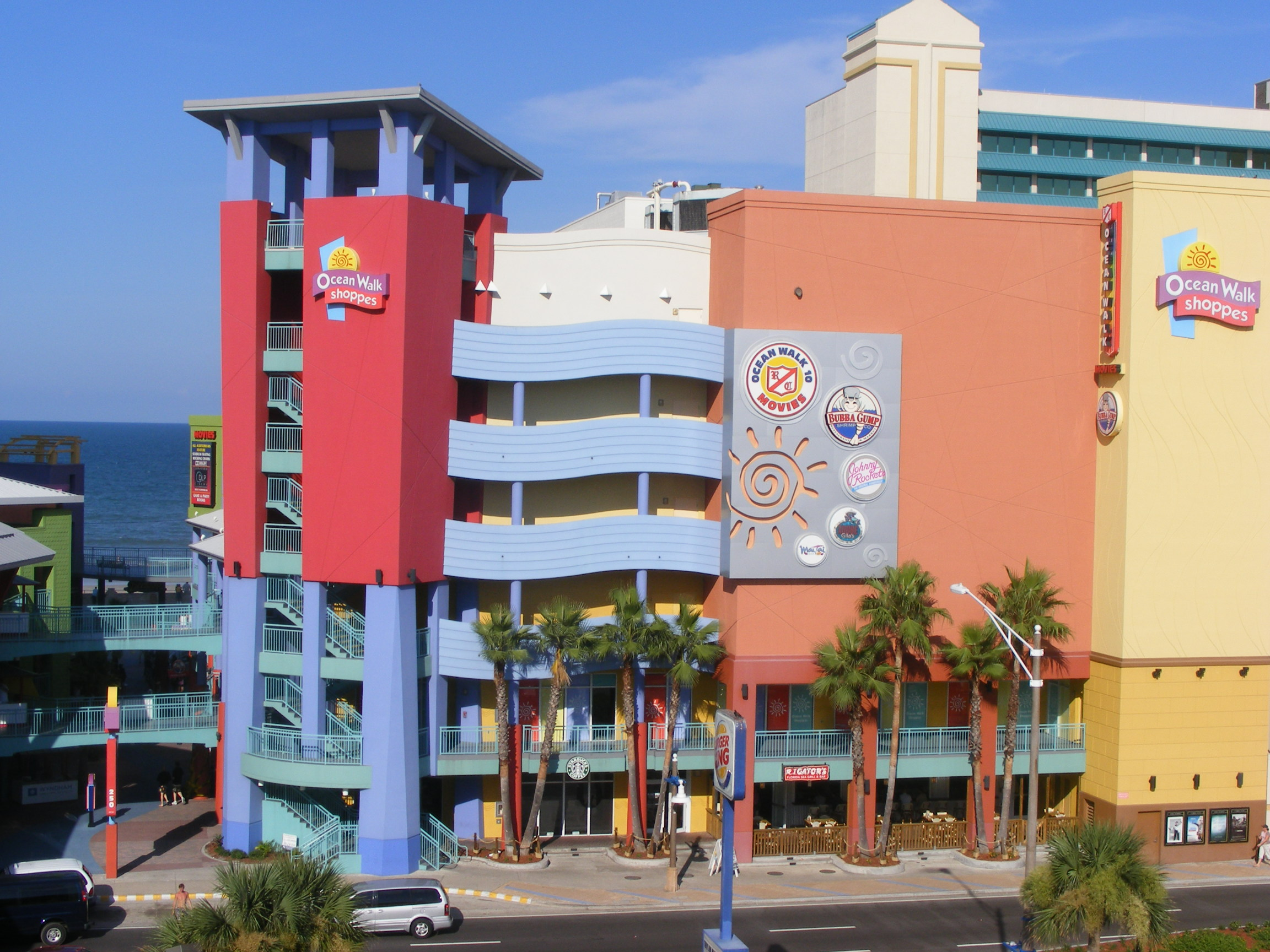
- Location: Daytona Beach, Florida, United States
- Coordinates: 29.231300°N 81.010000°W
- Opened: 2001
- Manager: Dundas Real Estate Investments
- Architect: Morris Architects, Orlando
- Num. of stores: 18
- Floor area: 110,000 sq ft (10,219 m^{2})
- Floors: 3
- Parking: Attached parking garage owned and managed by Volusia County
- Website: oceanwalkshoppes.com
- Information from Ocean Walk Shoppes

Ocean Walk Shoppes is an open-air shopping mall located in Daytona Beach, Florida.

== Major Retailers ==
Major retailers within the centre include:

- Wyndham Resorts
- Maui Nix Surf Shop
- Point Break
- Brik A Brak
- Rocket Fizz

== Major Restaurants ==
Major food retailers within the centre include:

- Bubba Gump Shrimp Company
- Dick's Last Resort
- Cold Stone Creamery
- The Beach Hut Cantina
- Dill Schnitzel and Pierogi House
- WingHouse Bar & Grill
- Mai Tai Bar

== Nearby Attractions ==
- Daytona Beach Boardwalk
- Ocean Center (Convention Center)
- Daytona Beach Bandshell
- Daytona Lagoon Waterpark
- Daytona Beach Boardwalk Amusements
- Daytona Beach Main Street Pier

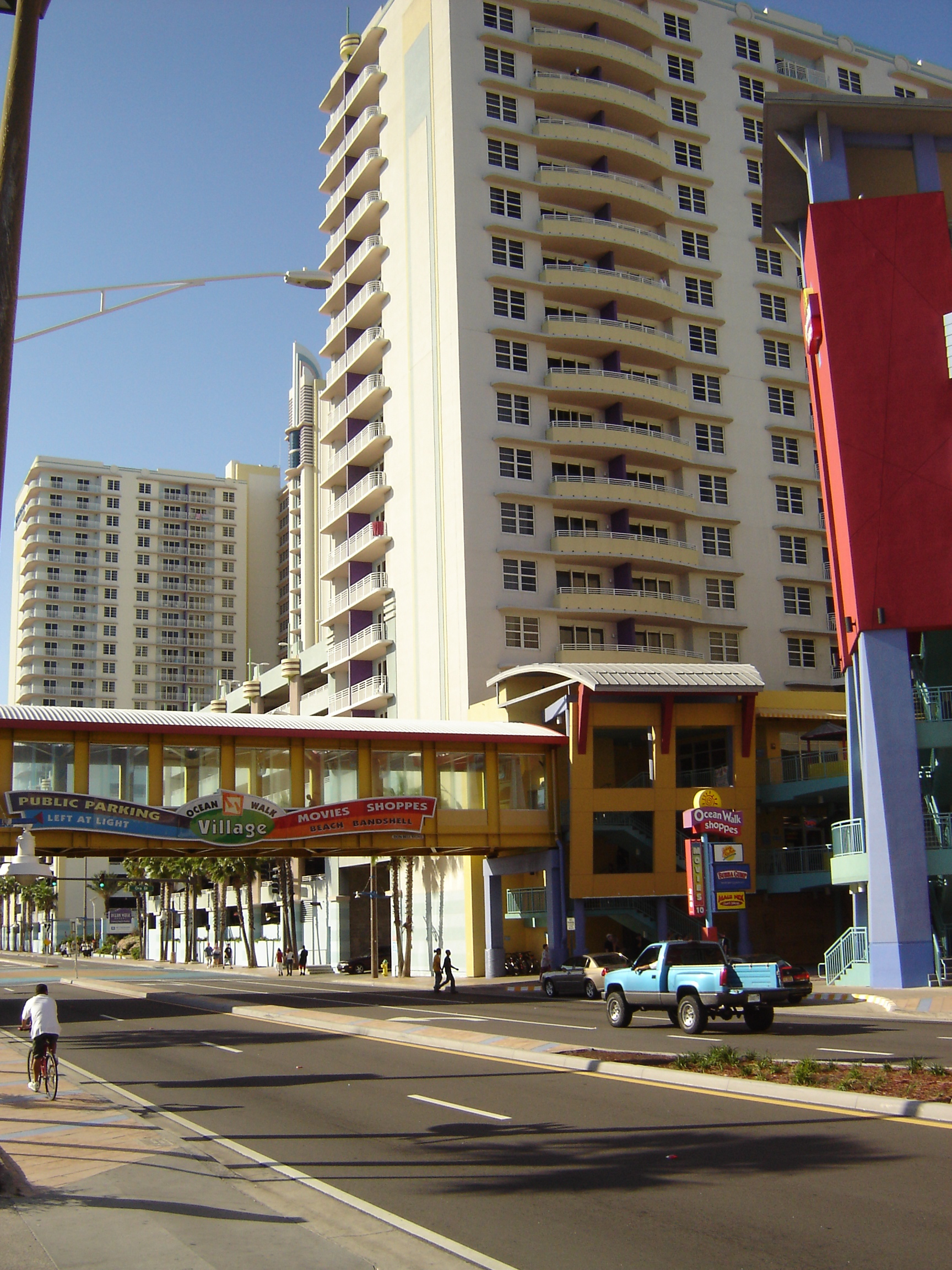
Walkway to the Ocean Walk Shoppes over A1A
