= Siege of Tarragona =

Siege of Tarragona may refer to several historical sieges of Tarragona including:

- Siege of Tarragona (1644), during the Catalan Revolt
- Siege of Tarragona (1811), during the Peninsular War
- Siege of Tarragona (1813), during the Peninsular War
