= Tarragona Tower =

- U.S. National Register of Historic Places
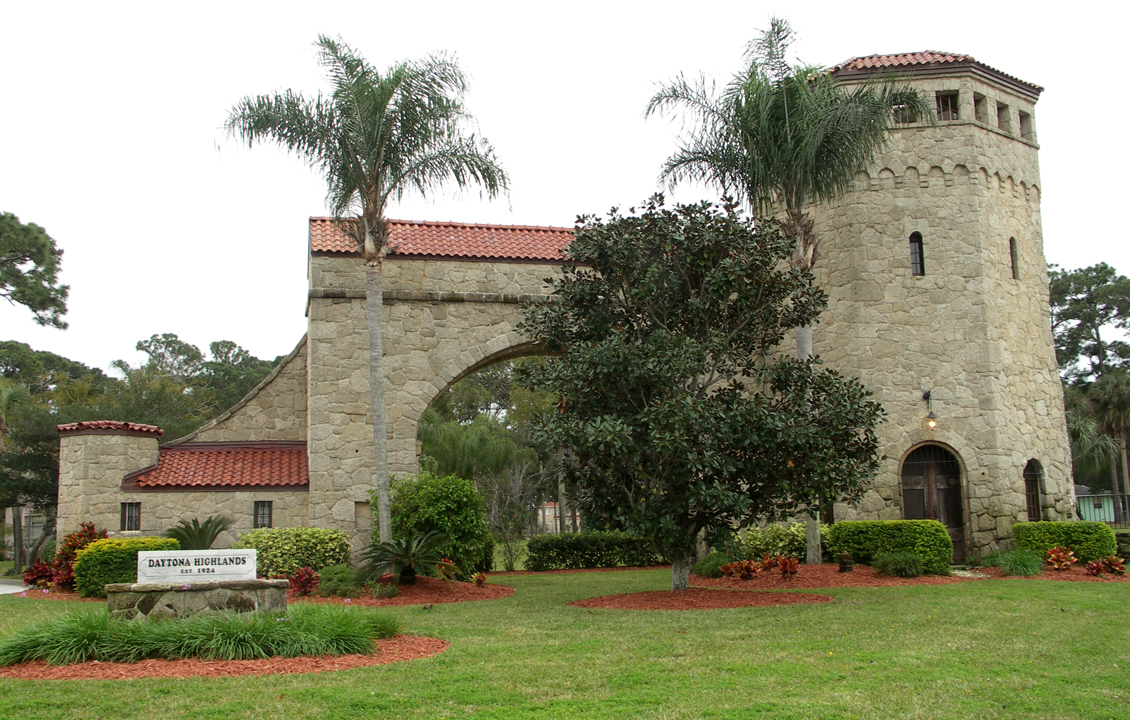
- Location: Daytona Beach, Florida United States
- Coordinates: 29°12′0″N 81°2′49″W
- Built: 1925
- Architect: Charles Ballough
- Architectural style: Mission/Spanish Revival
- NRHP reference No.: 05000368
- Added to NRHP: May 6, 2005

The Tarragona Tower is a structure in Daytona Beach, Florida. Completed in 1925, the building was created to mark the entrance to the Daytona Highlands Mediterranean Revival residential development, and features a Spanish Revival design. As the structure was partially demolished in 1942, and relocated entirely in 1994, a restoration of the tower was completed in 2004. In 2005, the tower was listed on the National Register of Historic Places, but remains inaccessible to the public.

== Structure's design and construction ==
The structure is called the Tarragona Tower (a.k.a. Tarragona Arch or Tarragona Castle) was designed by the Florida architect Elias F. De La Haye. It was built from local coquina rock of irregular shapes (all of the rock used was quarried from the nearby Tomoka quarry which was owned by Charles Ballough.) Approximately 4,000 cubic yards of coquina rock, 1,000 bags of cement mix, 1,800 feet of imported Spanish roofing tiles and imported Spanish flooring tiles were used in the construction. Its interior artwork is attributed to noted Volusia County, Florida artist Don J. Emery. The structure's design was inspired by an octagonal medieval tower and arches located in Tarragona, Spain. Its construction was completed in 1925 during the Florida Land Boom by prominent Volusia County builder Charles Ballough who often utilized native coquina rock in his projects. It originally had a double arch, one on each side of the tower which is 45 feet tall. The identical arches measure 40 feet high and are 150 feet in length and extend at 45-degree angles from the central tower. The solid coquina rock walls vary in thickness from 18 inches up to 4 feet and include several narrow window openings of various sizes that are located at different levels around the structure. The 24-foot-wide arches originally spanned across two streets: Tarragona Way and Volusia Avenue (now International Speedway Boulevard), and actually had motorized traffic driving underneath).

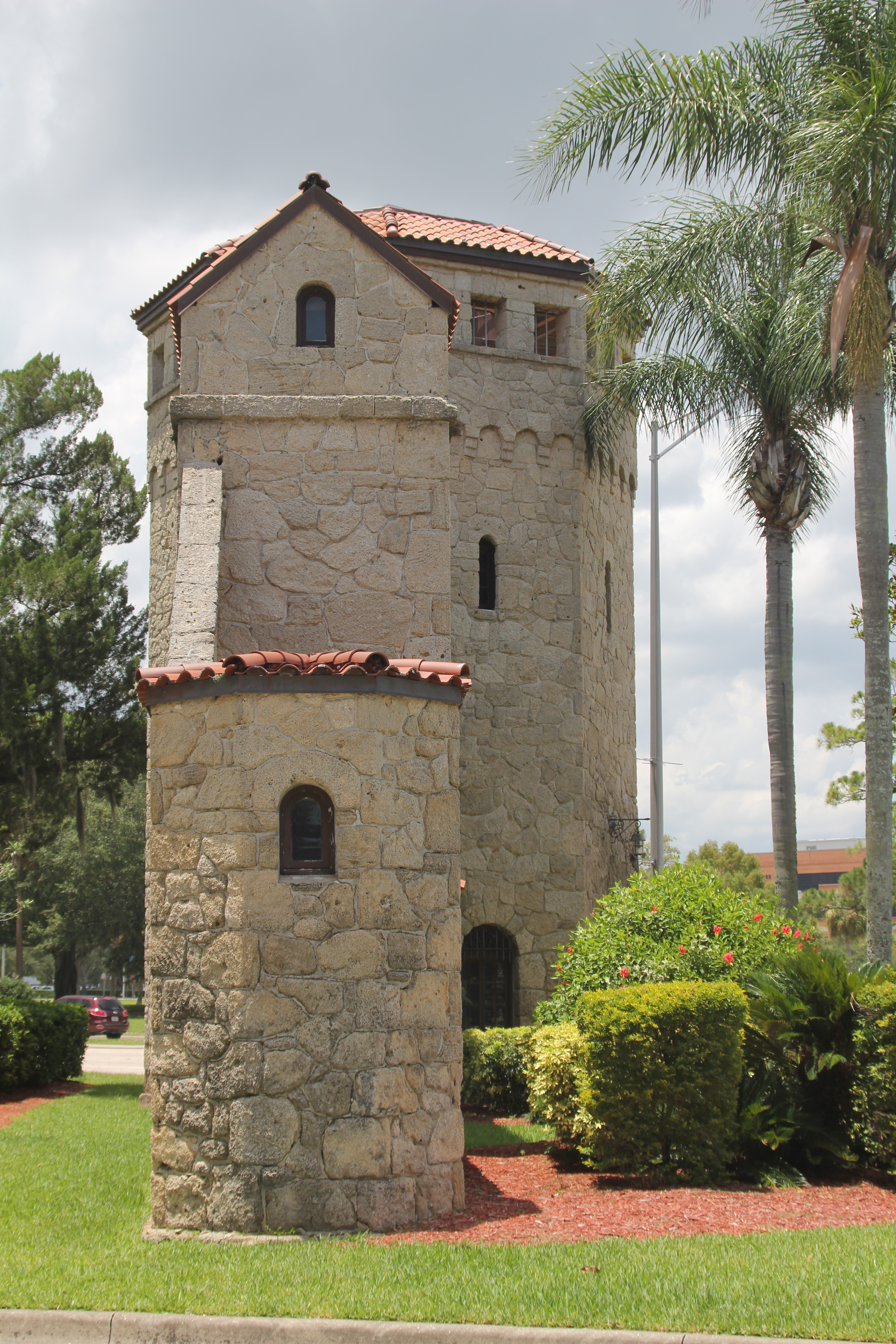
East Side view of the Tarragona Tower

== Original purpose ==
The structure's original purpose was to serve as a showy and atypical entrance way to the 1000-acre Daytona Highlands Mediterranean Revival residential development (originally called Coquina Highlands) which was proclaimed as “Florida’s Suburb of Hills and Lakes.” The structure was, in essence, a marketing strategy to promote property and home sales. It contains eight separate rooms. The ground floor was originally used as the developer's sales office and featured handmade Spanish furniture, a fireplace and powder room. It also included a lecture room, storeroom and drafting room above the ground floor. The top floor, accessible by an interior staircase, provided prospective property buyers and investors a bird's-eye view of the development and the surrounding area through a series of 24 windows. A powerful searchlight was also installed on the top floor that cast a beam of light through the 24 windows. The searchlight was illuminated every night and served as an advertisement for the development as it could be seen for miles around.

== Demolition of the northern arch in 1942 ==
During World War II the US Army was concerned that the arch over Volusia Avenue (now International Speedway Boulevard) would restrict troop and military vehicle movement. As a result, it was torn down in 1942 despite community opposition. Ironically, the US Army never used the road for its anticipated military purposes and the demolition of this portion of the Tarragona Tower structure was not necessary.

The patchwork repairs done to the north wall on the Tarragona Tower, which faces International Speedway Boulevard, after the arch was demolished are still observable. About two thirds up the north wall a triangular point is noticeable where the gable roof of the arch was once attached to the tower. From this triangular point all the way to ground level are coquina rock replacements that do not quite match with the original masonry. The doorway on the second level that led into the tower from the arch now has a wooden door with a square window that is secured with an exterior iron banister. A non-original exterior porch was constructed from coquina rock and its steps lead to an interior stairway. Iron railings were added to the porch and the entrance way to the tower's staircase has an iron gate that is locked for obvious safety and security purposes.

== Entire structure moved in 1994 ==
The Florida State Department of Transportation announced as early as 1985 that International Speedway Boulevard would be widened to six lanes. Several ideas were considered regarding the Tarragona Tower, which was in the way of the proposed new road construction. It could be torn down, the new road could go around it, the entire structure could be disassembled and rebuilt elsewhere, or it could be physically moved. There were problems and challenges with all these options. Tearing it down met with fierce public opposition, so that option was ruled out. Going around the structure proved to be too costly as the purchase of surrounding land was too expensive. Disassembling it and rebuilding it at another location was not feasible according to the state's engineers. Finally, it was decided to physically move the entire structure. In November 1994, the 800 ton structure was jacked up and placed on a specially constructed track and moved 75 feet south from its original location. The project cost $500,000. The move saved the Tarragona Tower from destruction, but its interior spaces remained in dire need of repair and restoration.

== Restoration project in 2004 ==
After the Great Depression halted building in the Daytona Highlands development the Tarragona Tower was no longer used as the developer's sales office. Residents used it as a community center until the 1950s. After many years of neglect (lack of maintenance and service) the Tarragona Tower's interior spaces became contaminated with debris, mold, rat and pigeon droppings. Additionally, it was suffering from significant termite damage to the interior wooden beams, and the structure's interior spaces had deteriorated to point that it was not functional and in hazardous condition.

BHM Architecture, Inc. coordinated the preservation of the structure by ensuring that existing problems were corrected and the interior restored. The structure's restoration project was completed in 2004 and cost approximately $400,000. The structure also received a non-evasive preventative subterranean termite treatment to prevent any future termite damage.

Since the interior spaces of the structure are small it was not feasible to install heating and air conditioning systems or provide handicap accessible restrooms and ramps. Per the Americans with Disabilities Act, Title III (Public Accommodations) the structure is not accessible to the public because it does not meet minimum standards for accessibility for alterations and new construction of facilities.

== Listed on the U.S. National Register of Historic Places in 2005 ==
On May 6, 2005, the Tarragona Tower was entered into the U.S. National Register of Historic Places (VO0043). Its historic functions are listed as Recreation and Culture/Monument/Marker with an Architectural Classification being Late 19th and 20th Century Revivals/Mission/Spanish Colonial Revival. Its areas of significance are listed as Architecture, Community Planning and Development. The period of significance is 1925-1955.

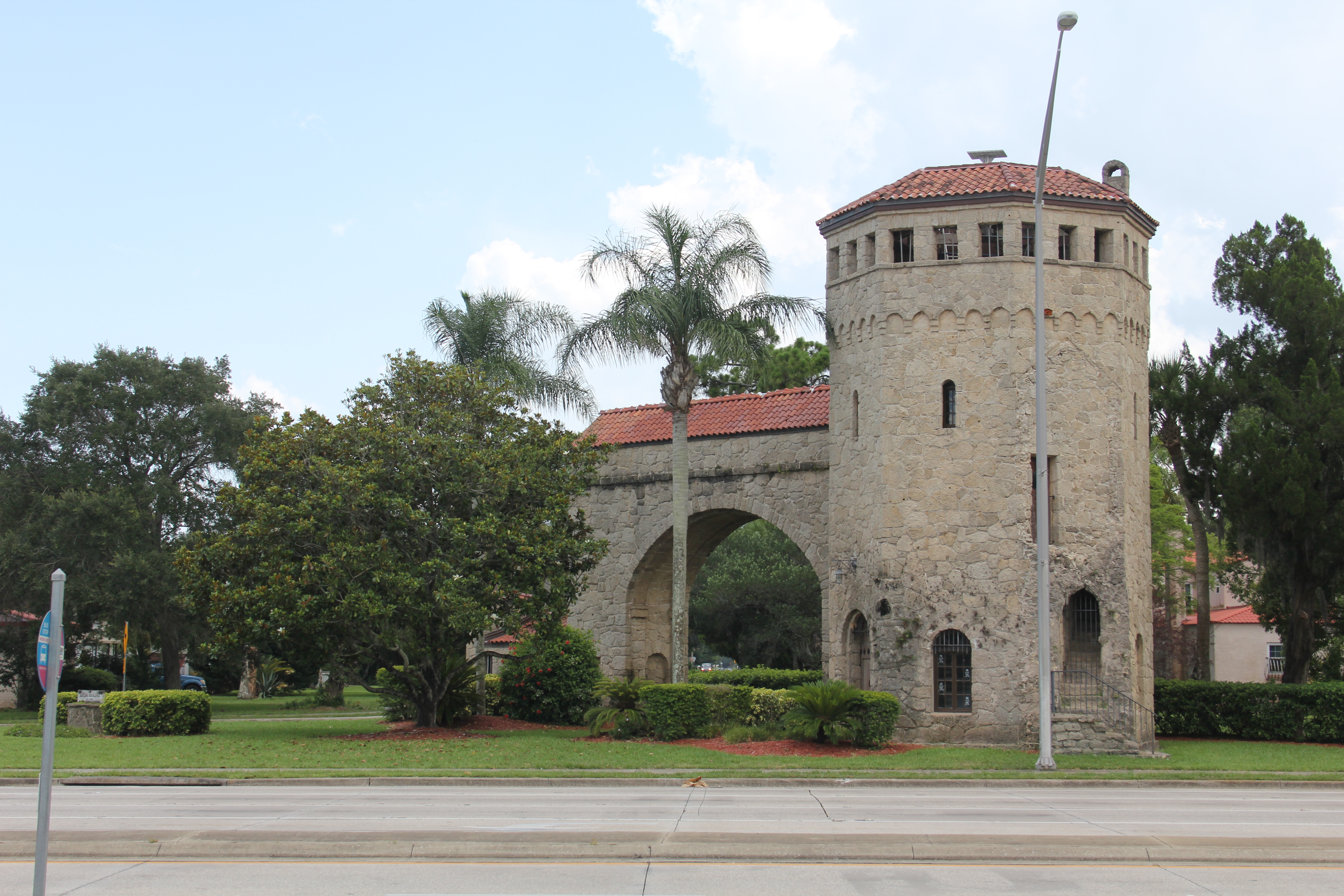
The Tarragona Tower - North View

== Florida Trust for Historic Preservation Award in 2006 ==
The Mission Statement for the Florida Trust for Historic Preservation, “…is to promote the preservation of the architectural, historical and archaeological heritage of Florida through advocacy, education and historic property stewardship.” The restoration and preservation of the Tarragona Tower received the prestigious Outstanding Restoration/Rehabilitation Award in 2006.

== Structure's legacy ==
The Tarragona Tower structure stands today as a reminder of developers who attempted to lure affluent buyers to the Daytona Beach area during the Florida Land Boom of the 1920s. It narrowly escaped attempts to tear it down and is now one of Florida's largest historic subdivision monuments left standing. It serves as a landmark in northeast Florida.
