= Green Cove =

Green Cove may refer to:

== Communities ==
- Green Cove, Newfoundland and Labrador, a settlement in Canada
- Green Cove, original name of the community of Port Maitland, Nova Scotia, Canada
- Green Cove Springs, Florida, a city in Clay County, Florida, U.S.

== Other uses ==
- Green Cove (Washington), a bay in the U.S. state of Washington
- Green Cove Lions, a defunct indoor football team in Florida
- Green Cove Springs Historic District, a historic district in Florida
- Green Cove Springs and Melrose Railroad, a railroad that operated in Florida between 1881 and 1899

== See also ==
- Green Bay (disambiguation)
