= Green Bay =

Green Bay may refer to:

== Geography ==
=== Bodies of water ===
- Green Bay (Lake Michigan), a bay of Wisconsin known to locals as the Bay of Green Bay
- Green Bay, Newfoundland and Labrador, a bay located on the island of Newfoundland

=== Populated places ===
- Green Bay, Alabama, United States
- Green Bay, New Zealand
- Green Bay, Nova Scotia, Canada
- Green Bay, small community of Northeastern Manitoulin and the Islands, Ontario, Canada
- Green Bay, Virginia (disambiguation), United States
- Greenbay, village in Antigua
- Green Bay, Wisconsin, United States
- Green Bay (town), Wisconsin, United States

== Sports teams ==
=== Associated with Green Bay, Wisconsin ===
- Green Bay Packers, an American football team and the best-known Green Bay sports team
- Green Bay Blizzard, a professional arena football team
- Green Bay Bombers, a former indoor arena American football team
- Green Bay Rockers, a collegiate summer baseball team, formerly the Bullfrogs and then the Booyah
- Green Bay Gamblers, a Tier 1 junior ice hockey team
- Green Bay Phoenix, the athletic program of the University of Wisconsin–Green Bay

=== Other ===
- Green Bay (American Samoa football club), an association football club in Faga'alu, American Samoa

== Other ==
- Roman Catholic Diocese of Green Bay, Wisconsin
- Green Bay Marathon

== See also ==
- Baie Verte (disambiguation)
- USS Green Bay
