= Petite Riviere Bridge =

Community in Nova Scotia, Canada

Coordinates: 44°13′59.33″N 64°26′49.21″W

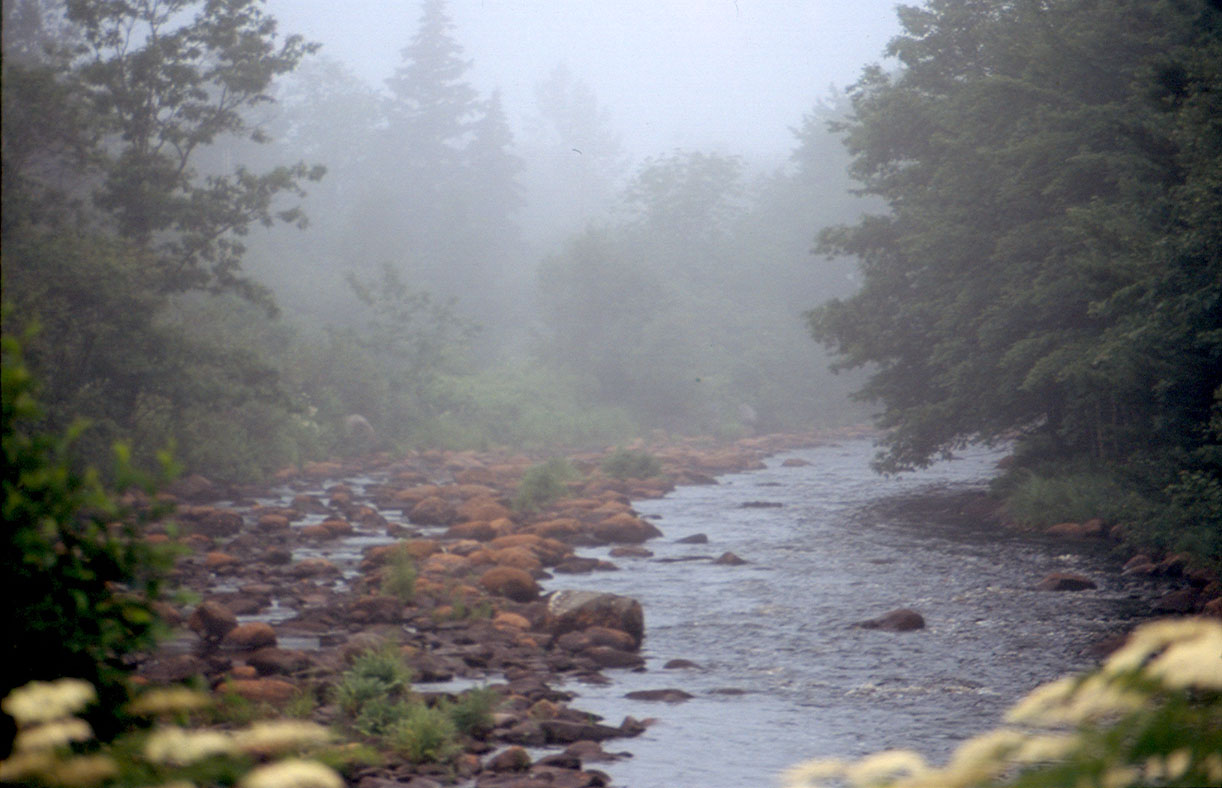
The Petite Rivière running through the community of Petite Rivière.

Petite Riviere in Nova Scotia

Petite Rivière is a rural community on Route 331 in Lunenburg County on the South Shore of Nova Scotia in Canada. It was formerly known as Petite Rivière Bridge.

The Nova Scotia tourism office refers to route 331 as the Lighthouse Route, a scenic drive along Nova Scotia's south shore, known not only for its lighthouses, but for its white sand beaches, historic settlements, and spectacular ocean views. Petite Rivière's year-round population of about 200 swells during the summer when occupants of vacation houses, cottage renters, and campers arrive. There are no hotels or large restaurants here, but about fifteen minutes away in Bridgewater there are supermarkets, banks, a hospital, doctors, and other services.

The village of Petite Rivière lines both sides of the river which bears the same name. Early French settlers gave the river its name in contrast to the nearby much larger LaHave River. Samuel de Champlain arrived in the area in 1604 and mapped the offshore islands which are still sparsely settled despite their beauty and proximity to the mainland. Native Mi'kmaq had a summer encampment in Petite before the 17th Century, and they were followed by a few French Acadians whose community did not survive for long. Today a small burying ground contains the remains of both Acadians and natives.

When the English had control of Nova Scotia in the mid-eighteenth century, they brought in many Palatine Germans to settle the area around today's Lunenburg. Some of these people and their descendants along with some English spread out to settle in adjacent areas such as Petite Rivière. The river provided access to the Atlantic Ocean. This access encouraged fishing and boat-building. By the nineteenth century tourists began flocking to Petite to enjoy its beaches and scenery

Today the center of the village is at the crossroad of Route 331 and Green Bay Road. Here the General Store supplies the everyday needs of residents and tourists and is the morning gathering place for coffee and conversation. Across the road is the local volunteer fire department which not only provides fire and emergency services but is a meeting hall for local groups and serves public breakfasts, suppers, and the occasional wedding reception. There are two other commercial buildings at this intersection as well as the Petite Villa, which before its renovation was the post office for Petite Rivière Bridge, Canada Post's official name for the community. An elementary school occupies a large lot not too far away, and two churches serve the village.

From the village center route 331 leads across the river and curves along the shore past Risser's Beach, a provincial campground which offers a long beach, a canteen, and a boardwalk above the marsh. The route continues to Crescent Beach on which cars are allowed for the convenience of sail boarders, paddle boarders, swimmers, and photographers. At the end of the beach a narrow bridge carries cars to the LaHave Islands where a museum welcomes visitors and displays a history of the islands.

In the other direction from the village center, Green Bay Road wanders along the western shore of the river until it reaches Green Bay on the ocean. Waterfront houses line Green Bay Road as it leaves the village center. At the intersection of the road with Drew's Hill Road, a cluster of elegant Victorian houses attests to the local prosperity of that era. Further along are summer cottages of many types, a group of short-term rental cottages, another beach, and a canteen. Where the road ends for automobiles a remnant of an old road provides an oceanside pathway for hikers to walk all the way to the next village.

The Petite Rivière is itself the primary reason people have been attracted to this place for centuries. For the earliest native inhabitants the river provided fish and shellfish, fresh water, and a pleasant place to spend the summer. The French settlers found the same advantages, and the English and German settlers found it a good spot for sea-based enterprises. When tourists discovered the village, they found abundant Atlantic salmon in the river, white sand beaches for swimming, waters for canoes and rowboats, and oceanside scenery for viewing, photographing or painting.

Through the years, artists have flocked to Petite Rivière with their legacy being works of art demonstrating the village's beauty. In the 1920s J.E.H. MacDonald came to Petite Rivière with Lewis Smith and his sister Edith Smith. All were artists, and MacDonald was one of the famous Canadian Group of Seven. Together they created paintings of Petite Rivière's bridge, the ocean, United Church, and many other buildings. A 1990 exhibition at the Dalhousie Art Gallery in Halifax brought many of their paintings together for public view. (Dalhousie Art Gallery, 1990, ISBN 0-7703-0650-0). Later in the twentieth century John Cook and Joan Dewar added to the list of professional artists working in Petite Rivière. Today there are many more artists working in the area and it is not unusual to see both amateur and professional artists in the village. Resident professional artists include Tom Alway and Peter Blais who own the Maritime Painted Saltbox gallery. Here they display their own fine art and folk art and arrange shows of the works of other area artists. River House features the work of rug hookers who produce their own form of art. Mariner Craft is a historic store that manufactures and sells a distinctive style of glass and other Canadian crafts.

It is located between Rissers Beach Provincial Park and the community of Green Bay. The local people commonly call the village simply "Petite".

The bridge over the Petite Rivière was destroyed in 2002 and has been replaced by a single-lane "temporary" bailey bridge.

Petite Rivière Elementary School is located in the community and has approximately 90 pupils.

Samuel de Champlain is said to have given the river its name after landing at the location in the early 17th century.
