= Edith Smith (artist) =

Canadian artist (1867–1954)

- Born: Edith Agnes Smith; October 2, 1867; Halifax, Nova Scotia, Canada
- Died: 1954 (aged 86–87); Petite Riviere, Nova Scotia, Canada
- Known for: Painter, Educator

Edith Agnes Smith (October 2, 1867 – 1954) was a Canadian painter and teacher. She was one of the original members of the Maritime Art Association and served as President of the Nova Scotia Museum of Fine Arts.

== Biography ==
She was born in Halifax, Nova Scotia on October 2, 1867, one of four children of Benjamin Smith, a well-known Halifax dry goods merchant, and Anna Maria Smith. She studied art at the Victoria School of Art and Design. She continued her studies at the Chelsea School of Art in London, United Kingdom and the Boston Art Club in Boston, Massachusetts.

In Halifax, Smith was involved in the artistic community as a member of the Nova Scotia Museum of Fine Arts and working to find the museum a permanent home. She was also involved with assembling the nascent museum's collection, including works by Frances Jones Bannerman, Lewis Smith, Stanley Royle, Marion Bond, and Arthur Lismer.

Smith briefly taught at the Victoria School of Art and Design in 1910 before teaching at the Halifax Ladies' College (now Armbrae Academy) from 1912 until her retirement.

She was a founding member of the Nova Scotia Society of Artists (NSSA) and president of the organization twice from 1932–1934 and 1941–1942, where she exhibited in every annual show until her death. Additionally, she exhibited her art at the Maritime Art Association, the National Gallery of Canada, the Royal Canadian Academy, the Ontario Society of Artists, and the Art Association of Montreal (now Montreal Museum of Fine Arts).

Smith's work is held in public and private collections, including the Art Gallery of Nova Scotia and the Dalhousie Art Gallery.

Smith died at Petite Rivière, Nova Scotia, in 1954.
