= Nolan Carroll =

American football player (born 1987)

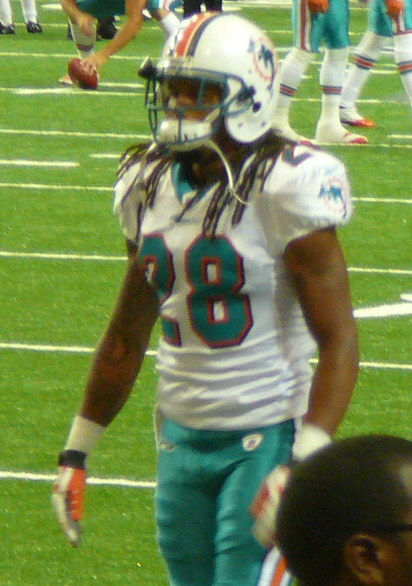
- Carroll with the Miami Dolphins in 2011

No. 28, 23, 22, 24
- Position: Cornerback

Personal information
- Born: January 18, 1987 (age 39); Green Cove Springs, Florida, U.S.
- Listed height: 6 ft 1 in (1.85 m)
- Listed weight: 202 lb (92 kg)

Career information
- High school: Clay (Green Cove Springs)
- College: Maryland (2005–2009)
- NFL draft: 2010: 5th round, 145th overall pick

Career history
- Miami Dolphins (2010–2013); Philadelphia Eagles (2014–2016); Dallas Cowboys (2017)

Career NFL statistics
- Total tackles: 284
- Interceptions: 8
- Pass deflections: 48
- Sacks: 3.0
- Forced fumbles: 2
- Defensive touchdowns: 1
- Stats at Pro Football Reference

Nolan Alexander Carroll II (born January 18, 1987) is an American former professional football player who was a cornerback in the National Football League (NFL). He played college football for the Maryland Terrapins. He was selected by the Miami Dolphins in the fifth round of the 2010 NFL draft. He also played for the Philadelphia Eagles and Dallas Cowboys.

== Early life ==
Nolan Carroll II was born on January 18, 1987 in Green Cove Springs, Florida. His mother, Jennifer, is a former Lieutenant Governor of Florida and a former United States Navy lieutenant commander. His father, Nolan Carroll, was a Senior Master Sergeant in the United States Air Force.

He attended Clay High School in Green Cove Springs, where he was a one-year letterman in soccer and a three-year starting wide receiver for the football team. In his second football game as a senior, he broke his leg and was forced to sit out for the rest of the 2004 season. Nevertheless, The Florida Times-Union named him to its Super 11 and Super 24 teams. PrepStar named him an All-Southeast region and SuperPrep an All-Dixie region player.

Carroll received athletic scholarship offers from Central Florida, Colorado, Louisville, Maryland, and Mississippi. Scout.com rated him a two-star college prospect, while Rivals.com considered him a three-star prospect. He ultimately committed to attend the University of Maryland.

== College career ==
Carroll sat out the 2005 season on redshirt status, and was named the scout team player of the week for his performance in the practices in preparation for the Florida State game. In 2006, Carroll saw action in all 13 games as a reserve wide receiver and on special teams. He recorded five kickoff returns for 60 yards. Against West Virginia, he had two returns for 12 yards; against Boston College, he had two for 31 yards; and against Wake Forest, he had one for 17 yards.

In 2007, he was converted to the cornerback position, and saw action in all 13 games as a reserve. He recorded seven tackles on special teams, and returned five kickoffs for 84 yards. He saw action in the 2007 Emerald Bowl against Oregon State, but recorded no statistics. In 2008, he saw action in ten games including four starts as a cornerback. Carroll recorded 37 tackles. In the 2008 Humanitarian Bowl against Nevada, he tallied seven tackles including four solo, and broke up two passes.

Carroll entered the 2009 season as a starting cornerback, but broke his leg in a September 12 game against James Madison, and missed the rest of the season. Prior to the season, he was elected by his teammates as one of the team's four captains. Defensive coordinator Don Brown said of Carroll, "If you were going to clone a guy at that position that he plays, he'd be one of the prototypes." The NFL Draft Scout, a CBS Sports affiliate, considered Carroll the 25th out of 225 ranked cornerback prospects for the 2010 NFL draft, and projected him as a sixth- or seventh-round selection.

== Professional career ==
Pre-draft measurables
Height	Weight	Arm length	Hand span	40-yard dash	10-yard split	20-yard split	20-yard shuttle	Three-cone drill	Vertical jump	Broad jump	Bench press
5 ft 11 1/2 in (1.82 m)	204 lb (93 kg)	31 in (0.79 m)	9 1/4 in (0.23 m)	4.42 s	1.53 s	2.55 s	4.21 s	6.81 s	37.5 in (0.95 m)	10 ft 3 in (3.12 m)	17 reps
All values from NFL Combine/Pro Day

NFL Draft Scout, a CBS Sports affiliate, considered Carroll the 24th out of 225 ranked cornerback prospects for the 2010 NFL draft, and projected him as a sixth- or seventh-round selection.

=== Miami Dolphins ===
Carroll was selected by the Miami Dolphins in the fifth round (145th overall) of the 2010 NFL draft. The pick was received in a trade with the San Francisco 49ers for wide receiver Ted Ginn Jr. He was considered one of the team's most promising rookies, and saw action on special teams during the preseason. In Week 4, he handled kickoff return duties against the New England Patriots. Carroll was part of an improved Miami special teams unit two weeks later against the Green Bay Packers, a game in which he averaged 26.0 yards per kickoff return.

On December 13, 2010, New York Jets strength and conditioning coach Sal Alosi extended his knee to trip Carroll as he was running out of bounds to avoid being blocked during a punt (it is illegal to block or tackle players out of bounds, non-players like Alosi are not permitted to be on the field during live play.) Ex-Dolphin Zach Thomas later claimed that Alosi had ordered a wall formed on the edge of the coaching box in order to prevent the practice of players running out of bounds to avoid being blocked. Alosi was eventually suspended for the rest of the 2010 season. In the same game, Carroll recorded his first career interception when he picked off Jets' quarterback Mark Sanchez.

In 2012, after cornerback Richard Marshall was placed on IR, Carroll was elevated to the starting role for the majority of season.

=== Philadelphia Eagles ===
On March 13, 2014, he signed a two-year, $5 million contract with the Philadelphia Eagles. He started in the last game of the season against the New York Giants.

In 2015, he was named the starter at cornerback opposite Byron Maxwell. On September 20, during the home opener loss against the Dallas Cowboys, Carroll tackled a fan who ran on the field. On October 19, in the Monday Night Football game vs. the New York Giants Carroll intercepted Giant's quarterback Eli Manning and returned the interception for a touchdown giving his team a 14–7 lead (the Eagles won the game 27–7). On November 27, he was placed on injured reserve list with a broken right fibula he suffered against the Detroit Lions. He finished with 11 starts.

On March 15, 2016, Carroll re-signed a one-year, $2.36 million contract. He started 16 games, registering 4 tackles and one interception.

=== Dallas Cowboys ===
On March 10, 2017, Carroll signed a three-year, $10 million contract with the Dallas Cowboys, to help replace cornerbacks Brandon Carr and Morris Claiborne who left in free agency. On May 29, he was arrested on suspicion of driving while intoxicated.

Although he struggled in preseason, he was named the starter at right cornerback for the season opener. He suffered a concussion in the second game against the Denver Broncos and was declared inactive for the next three contests. On October 11, Carroll was released after playing less than six full quarters.

== NFL career statistics ==
Legend
**Bold**	Career high

Year	Team	Games		Tackles					Interceptions					Fumbles			
Year	Team	GP	GS	Cmb	Solo	Ast	Sck	TFL	Int	Yds	TD	Lng	PD	FF	FR	Yds	TD
2010	MIA	13	1	3	3	0	0.0	0	1	1	0	1	2	0	0	0	0
2011	MIA	15	3	32	28	4	0.0	0	1	0	0	0	4	0	0	0	0
2012	MIA	14	10	53	**46**	7	1.0	**2**	0	0	0	0	6	**1**	0	0	0
2013	MIA	**16**	12	47	43	4	**2.0**	**2**	**3**	**24**	0	**24**	**11**	0	0	0	0
2014	PHI	**16**	1	32	31	1	0.0	1	0	0	0	0	4	0	**1**	0	0
2015	PHI	11	11	**57**	42	**15**	0.0	0	2	18	**1**	17	10	0	0	0	0
2016	PHI	**16**	**16**	55	41	14	0.0	0	1	0	0	0	**11**	**1**	0	0	0
2017	DAL	2	2	5	5	0	0.0	0	0	0	0	0	0	0	0	0	0
		103	56	284	239	45	3.0	5	8	43	1	24	48	2	1	0	0
