= Naval Air Station Lee Field =

Former US Naval Air Station anb Reserve Fleet installation

Naval Air Station Lee Field: Naval Air Station Green Cove Springs; Atlantic Reserve Fleet, Florida
- Green Cove Springs, Florida
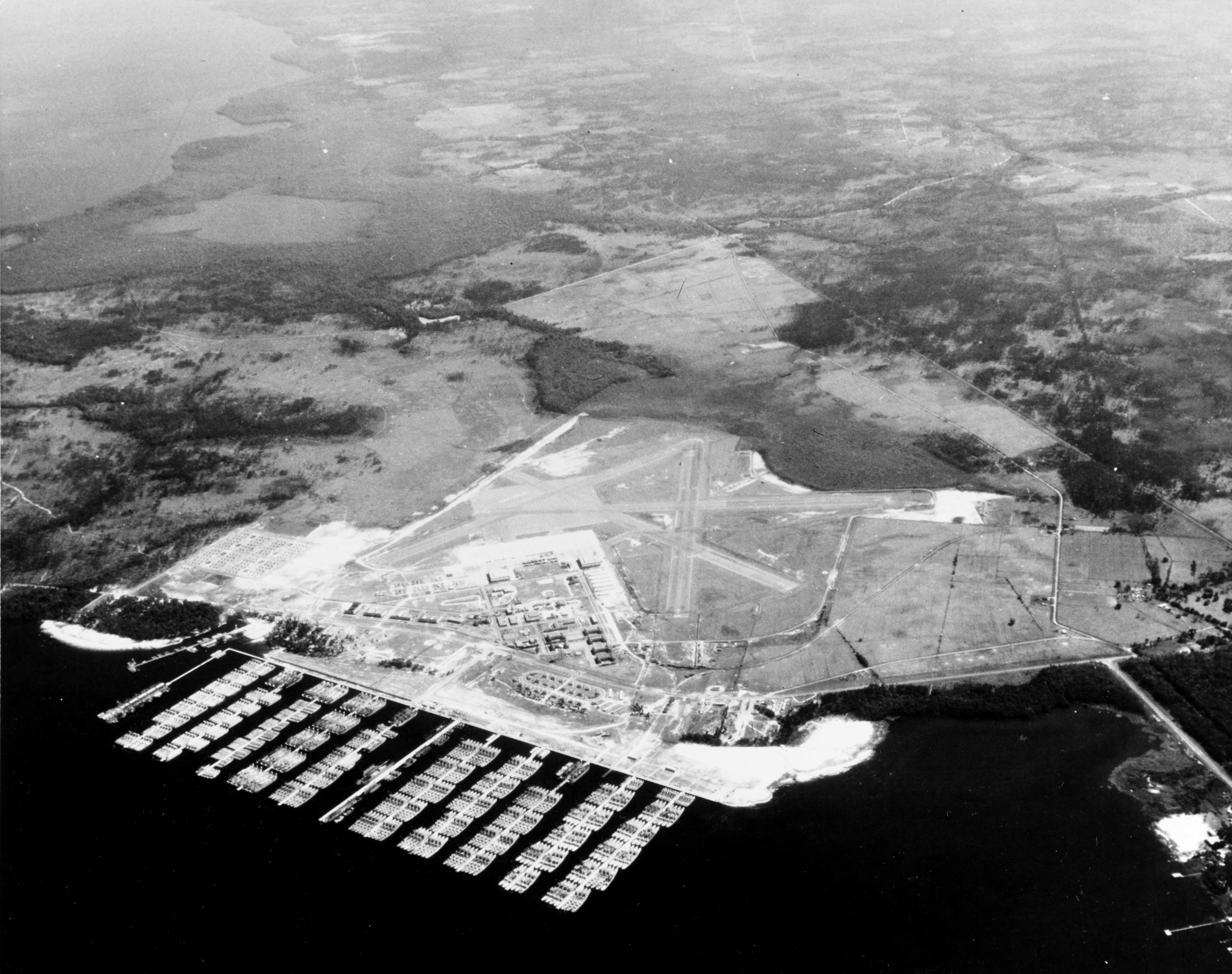
- Naval Base Green Cove Springs 1948

Site information
- Type: Naval Air Station Lee Field (1940 1943; Naval Air Station Green Cove Springs (1943-1962); Reserve Fleet (1946-1962)
- Owner: United States of America
- Controlled by: United States Navy

Site history
- In use: 1940-1965

Reynolds Airpark
- IATA: none; ICAO: none; FAA LID: FL60

Summary
- Airport type: Private
- Operator: Clay County Port, Inc.
- Location: Green Cove Springs, FL
- Built: 1940
- In use: 1984 – present
- Occupants: Pegasus Technologies, Inc.
- Interactive map of Reynolds Airpark

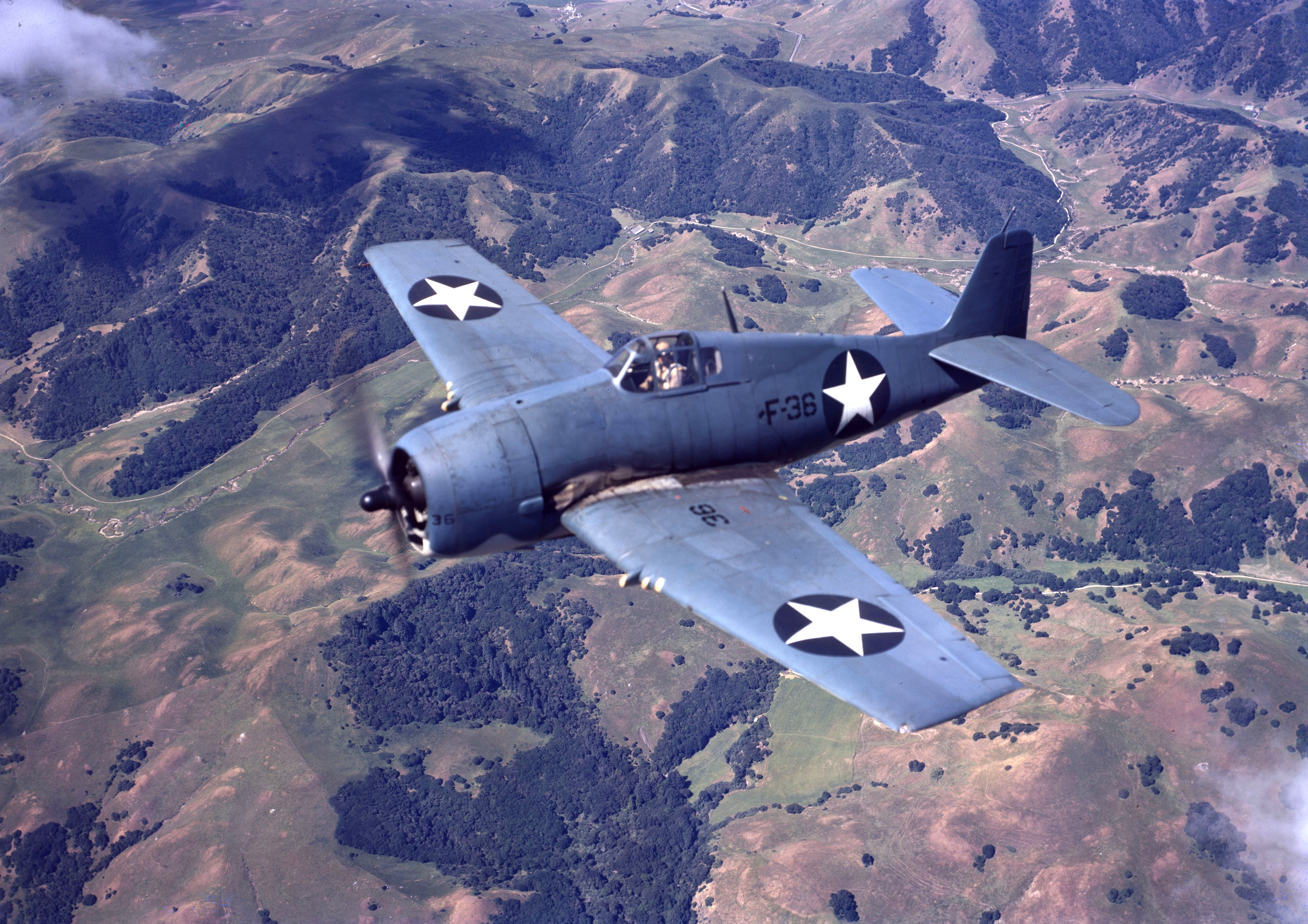
An Grumman F6F-3 Hellcat in 1943, most common plane used for training at Naval Air Station Lee Field

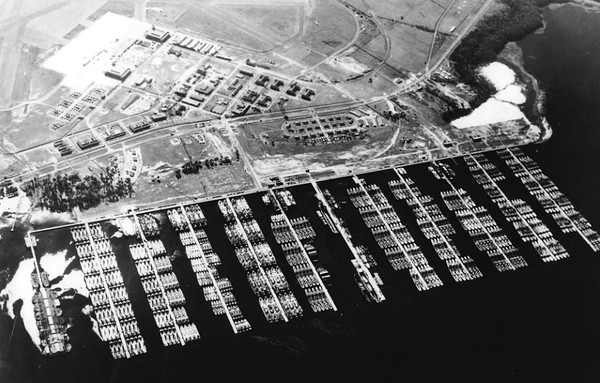
Atlantic Reserve Fleet Florida in 1947

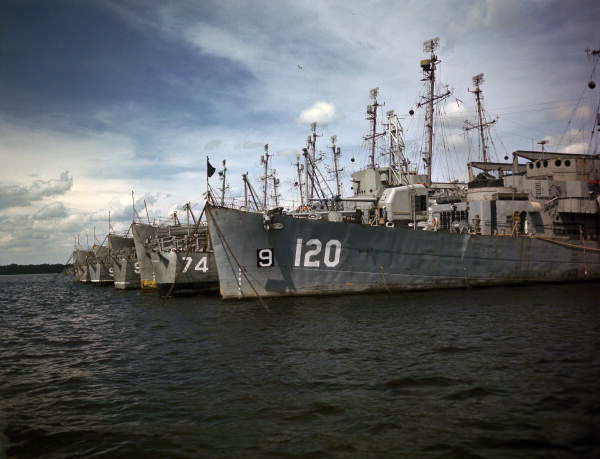
Naval ships "mothballed" at Green Cove Springs, front USS Kline (APD-120) and USS John P. Gray (APD-74)

Naval Air Station Lee Field was a United States Navy air base that opened on September 11, 1940, in Green Cove Springs, Florida to support the World War II efforts. The Air Station was on the St. Johns River in Clay County, Florida. The Air Station and Navy base was on 1,560 acres. The US Navy and United States Marine Corps used the site to train pilots on four 5,000-foot (1,500 m) asphalt runways. The Grumman F6F Hellcat fighter plane was the most common plane use at the Navy Air Station. The Vought F4U Corsair was a common plane for the Marine Corps training. The base was named after Ensign Bejamin Lee, who was killed during World War I in a plane crash at Killinghome, England. Naval Air Station Lee Field was renamed Naval Air Station Green Cove Springs in August 1943. After the war, Naval Air Station Green Cove Springs was reorganized into a Naval Auxiliary Air Station (NAAS) of Naval Air Station Jacksonville. The Naval Auxiliary Air Station closed in June 1962.

== Atlantic Reserve Fleet, Florida ==
In 1946 the Atlantic Reserve Fleet, Florida, also called the Atlantic Reserve Fleet, Green Cove Springs opened next to the Naval Air Station Green Cove Springs in the St. Johns River. The Atlantic Reserve Fleet, Florida was part of the United States Navy reserve fleets, also called mothball fleet, was used to store the now many surplus ships after World War II. The freshwater was good for long-term storage for ships. At its peak the reserve fleet had 600 ships. In the fleet were destroyers, destroyer escorts, troop ships and US Navy auxiliary ships. Some ships in the fleet were reactivated for the Korean War and Vietnam War. The reserve fleet and Air Station were closed in June 1962. The land was deeded to the City of Green Cove Springs. In 1965, the site was sold to J. Louis Reynolds. The site today is the Clay County Port and Reynolds Industrial Park. One runway remains as the Reynolds Airpark Airport (FL60). Some of the former airfield land was used as a test track for anti-lock brakes by Kelsey-Hayes/TRW Automotive. At the site is the original Naval Air Station Lee Field air traffic control tower and aircraft hangars.

== Military Museum of North Florida ==
Military Museum of North Florida is located at the Reynolds Industrial Park opened in 2007. Located at 1 Bunker Avenue, Green Cove Springs, Florida, off State Road 16 East (Leonard C. Taylor Parkway) at 29.979914°N 81.653206°W. The Museum features indoor and outdoor displays of plane and vehicles.

== See also ==
- Naval Air Station Pensacola
- St. Johns River Shipbuilding Company
- Tampa Shipbuilding Company
