= Will Holden (American football) =

American football player (born 1993)

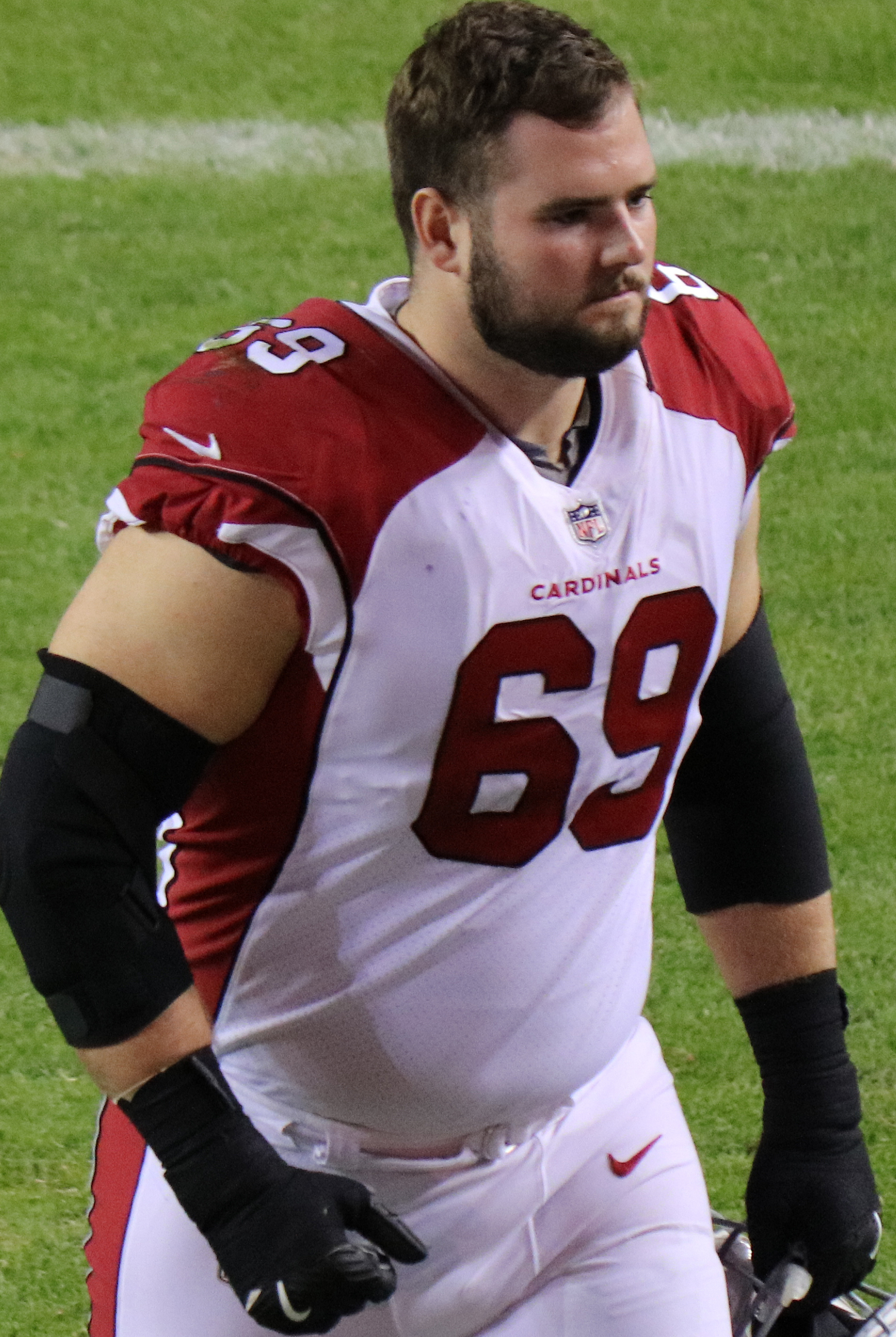
- Holden with the Arizona Cardinals in 2017

No. 66, 69
- Position: Offensive tackle

Personal information
- Born: September 14, 1993 (age 33); Green Cove Springs, Florida, U.S.
- Listed height: 6 ft 7 in (2.01 m)
- Listed weight: 330 lb (150 kg)

Career information
- High school: Clay (Green Cove Springs)
- College: Vanderbilt (2012–2016)
- NFL draft: 2017: 5th round, 157th overall pick

Career history
- Arizona Cardinals (2017); Indianapolis Colts (2018)*; New Orleans Saints (2018)*; Arizona Cardinals (2018); Miami Dolphins (2019)*; Seattle Seahawks (2019)*; San Francisco 49ers (2019)*; Baltimore Ravens (2019–2020); Indianapolis Colts (2020); Detroit Lions (2021); New York Giants (2022)*; Cleveland Browns (2022)*
- * Offseason or practice squad member only

Awards and highlights
- Second-team All-SEC (2016)

Career NFL statistics
- Games played: 27
- Games started: 9
- Stats at Pro Football Reference

Will Holden (born September 14, 1993) is an American former professional football player who was an offensive tackle in the National Football League (NFL). He played college football for the Vanderbilt Commodores and was selected by the Arizona Cardinals in the fifth round of the 2017 NFL draft.

== College career ==
Holden red-shirted his first season at Vanderbilt in 2012. He played in every game his red-shirt freshman on special teams and offense. His sophomore got more snaps on offense and played most downs on special teams. He then started every game in his junior year at left tackle in 2015. His senior season, Holden again started at left tackle and earned All-Southeastern Conference 2nd team(coaches) honors. Holden graduated from Vanderbilt University in December 2016 with a degree in Human and Organizational Development, where he was a member of Pi Kappa Alpha. He recently proposed to his long-time girlfriend from Vanderbilt, Casey Musicant.

== Professional career ==
=== Pre-draft ===
Prior to the combine, Holden played guard at the East–West Shrine Game and the Senior Bowl. Holden has an impressive week of practices leading up to the shrine game and was identified by NFL analyst as one of the players who raised his draft stock. Holden also attended Vanderbilt's Pro Day, but was satisfied with his combine performance and opted to only do positional drills. New England Patriot's head coach Bill Belichick and representatives from 28 NFL teams attended Vanderbilt's Pro Day to scout Holden, Zach Cunningham, and nine other players. At the conclusion of the pre-draft process, he was projected to be a third or fourth round draft pick from the majority of scouts and analysts. He was ranked the tenth best offensive tackle by NFLDraftScout.com.

Pre-draft measurables
Height	Weight	Arm length	Hand span	40-yard dash	10-yard split	20-yard split	20-yard shuttle	Three-cone drill	Vertical jump	Broad jump	Bench press
6 ft 7 1/2 in (2.02 m)	311 lb (141 kg)	33 1/4 in (0.84 m)	10 1/8 in (0.26 m)	5.47 s	1.83 s	3.10 s	4.72 s	7.71 s	28 in (0.71 m)	9 ft 3 in (2.82 m)	23 reps
All values from NFL Combine

=== Arizona Cardinals (first stint) ===
The Arizona Cardinals selected Holden in the fifth round (157th overall) of the 2017 NFL draft. He was the seventh offensive tackle selected in 2017 and the 17th offensive linemen. On May 12, 2017, the Cardinals signed Holden to a four-year, $2.66 million contract with a signing bonus of $268,132. He played in seven games with five starts in his rookie season.

On September 2, 2018, Holden was waived by the Cardinals.

=== Indianapolis Colts (first stint) ===
On September 13, 2018, Holden was signed to the Indianapolis Colts' practice squad. He was released on September 24, 2018.

=== New Orleans Saints ===
On October 2, 2018, Holden was signed to the New Orleans Saints' practice squad. He was released on November 28, 2018.

=== Arizona Cardinals (second stint) ===
On November 29, 2018, Holden was signed by the Cardinals. He was released on July 20, 2019.

=== Miami Dolphins ===
On July 21, 2019, Holden was claimed off waivers by the Miami Dolphins. He was waived on August 26, 2019.

=== Seattle Seahawks ===
On August 27, 2019, Holden was signed by the Seattle Seahawks. He was waived on August 31, 2019.

=== San Francisco 49ers ===
On September 17, 2019, Holden was signed to the San Francisco 49ers practice squad. On December 3, 2019, Holden was released from the practice squad.

=== Baltimore Ravens ===
On December 4, 2019, Holden was signed to the Baltimore Ravens' practice squad. He signed a reserve/future contract with the Ravens on January 13, 2020. He was waived during final roster cuts on September 5, 2020, and re-signed to the practice squad the next day. He was elevated to the active roster on November 21 for the team's week 11 game against the Tennessee Titans, and reverted to the practice squad after the game. He was placed on the practice squad/COVID-19 list by the team on November 28, 2020, and restored to the practice squad on December 9.

=== Indianapolis Colts (second stint) ===
On December 10, 2020, Holden was signed by the Colts off the Ravens practice squad.

On August 31, 2021, Holden was waived by the Colts.

=== Detroit Lions ===
Holden was signed to the Detroit Lions practice squad on September 9, 2021. He was promoted to the active roster on September 16, 2021.

=== New York Giants ===
On August 5, 2022, the New York Giants signed Holden. He was waived on August 30, 2022 and signed to the practice squad the next day. On November 14, 2022, he was released.

=== Cleveland Browns ===
On November 22, 2022, Holden signed to the Cleveland Browns practice squad He was released on December 2.
