= Ellis & McClure =

Jacksonville, Florida Architecture firm

Ellis and McClure was an architecture firm in Jacksonville, Florida formed by Alfred E. McClure 1836 - ca. 1912) and Robert Ellis (1843 - ca. 1928). In the course of the 15-year partnership they designed many prominent buildings in Jacksonville as well as the Clay County Courthouse (1890).

Ellis arrived in 1872 after training in New York, and was the first engineer employed by the Springfield. He joined with McClure in 1873 and was involved in waterworks projects. His residence was constructed at 24 East 2nd Street before being moved in 1987 to 1131 N. Laura Street.

== Additional works ==
- Sub-Tropical Exposition Building, opening attended by President Grover Cleveland
