= Clay High School (Clay County, Florida) =

Public school in Florida, United States

Coordinates: 29.982342°N 81.712937°W

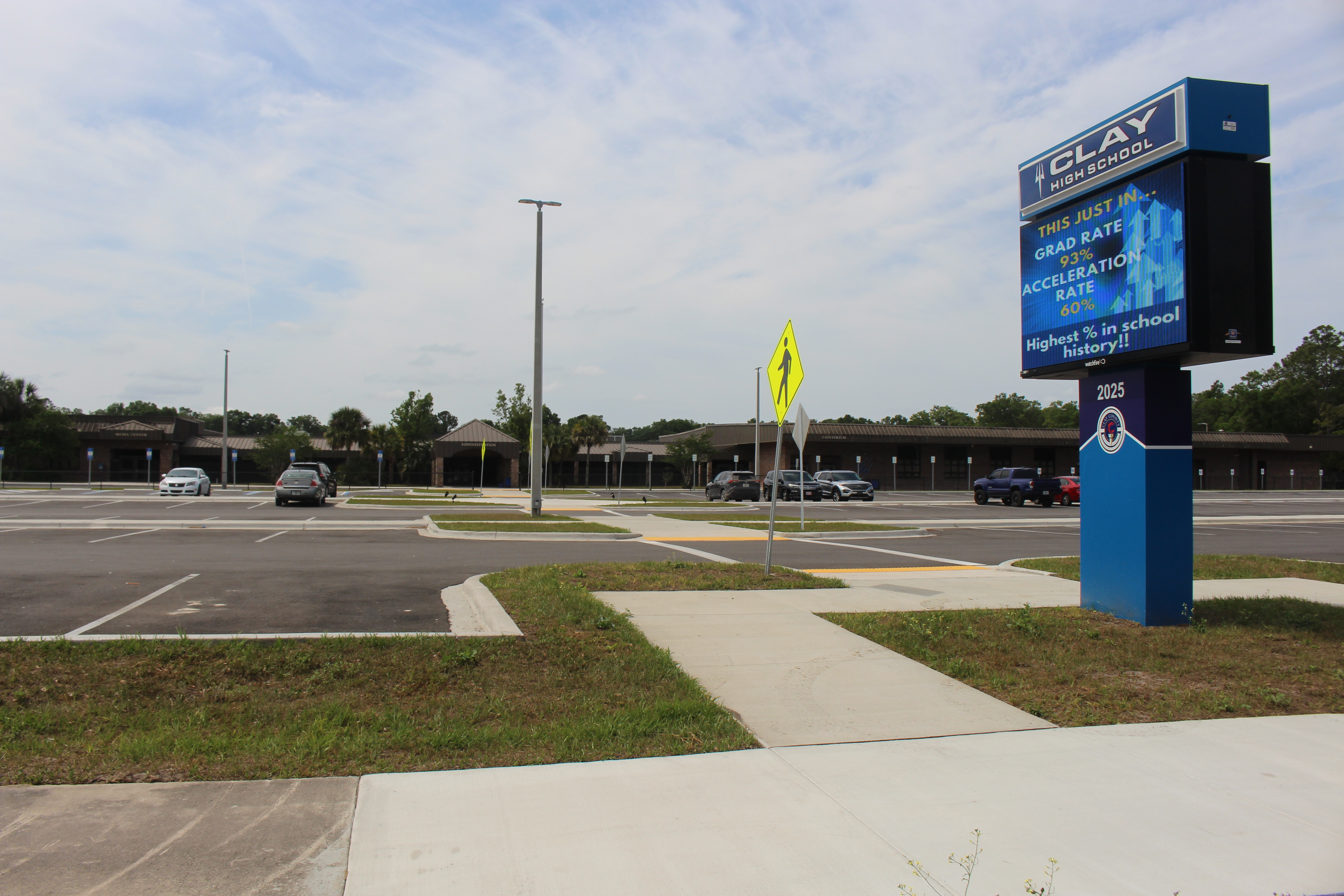
- "Proud Home Of the Blue Devils"

Location
- 2025 FL-16; Green Cove Springs, Florida, U.S.

Information
- Type: Public
- Motto: "Once a Blue Devil always a Blue Devil"
- Established: 1936
- School district: Clay County School District
- Principal: Amanda Stilianou
- Staff: 83.60 (on an FTE basis)
- Grades: 9–12
- Enrollment: 1,776 (2024–2025)
- Student to teacher ratio: 21.24
- Campus size: 10 acres (40,000 m^{2})
- Campus type: Rural
- Colors: Blue and white
- Athletics: Blue Devils
- Mascot: Blue Devils
- Website: www.oneclay.net/o/chs/

Clay High School is a four-year high school located in unincorporated Clay County, Florida, with a Green Cove Springs post address. It is a part of the Clay County School District.

== Name ==
As Clay High School is named after the county it is located in, Clay County, it is indirectly named for Henry Clay, Sr. Clay was a dominant figure in both the First Party System to 1824, and the Second Party System after that. Known as "The Great Compromiser" and "The Great Pacifier" for his ability to bring others to agreement, he was the founder and leader of the Whig Party and a leading advocate of programs for modernizing the economy, especially tariffs to protect industry, a national bank, and internal improvements to promote canals, ports and railroads.

== Clay County ==
Clay High School was the first high school in Clay County. Prior to the construction of other high schools in the county during the mid-20th century, Clay High School served every city in the county, including Keystone Heights, Green Cove Springs, Orange Park, Penny Farms, and all the unincorporated towns in the county.

== Original location ==
Clay High School was located at the Green Cove Springs Junior High, but now it has been moved to a much larger building off of SR 16, about 2 miles from the original school.

== History ==
In 1997 students helped build portable buildings for school district schools; at the time the district relied heavily on portable buildings.

== Notable alumni ==
- Cliff Avril – NFL defensive end for the Seattle Seahawks
- Kyle Bird – MLB pitcher
- Frank J. Canova – inventor of the smartphone.
- Nolan Carroll, Jr – former NFL defensive back
- Caeleb Dressel – American record holder, world record holder, Olympic gold medalist swimmer
- Dane Dunning – MLB Pitcher for the Texas Rangers
- Will Holden – NFL offensive linemen for Arizona Cardinals
