= Paul Bentzen =

Canadian geneticist

Paul Bentzen is a Canadian geneticist and professor at the Dalhousie University Department of Biology.

== Education and career ==
Bentzen holds a Bachelor of Science from McGill University, a Master of Science from the University of British Columbia, and a PhD from McGill University. He is a professor at the biology department of Dalhousie University in Halifax, Nova Scotia, where his research focuses on population and evolutionary genetics, molecular ecology, and conservation biology, particularly relating to fish.

At Dalhousie University's Aquatron, Bentzen leads a captive breeding program for the critically endangered Atlantic whitefish, a species unique to Nova Scotia. He took over the program in 2018. Working with the Canadian Department of Fisheries and Oceans, researchers at the Aquatron successfully bred 2,200 of the fish.
