= Frank J. Canova =

American electronics designer

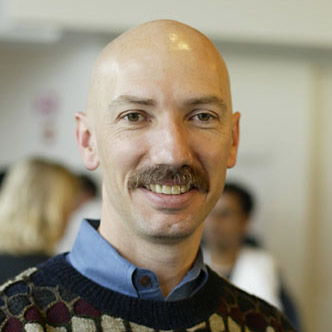
- Frank J. Canova Jr., inventor of the first smartphone
- Born: December 23, 1956 (age 69); Wilmington, Delaware, U.S.
- Occupation: Electronics designer
- Known for: Originated the idea for the IBM Simon

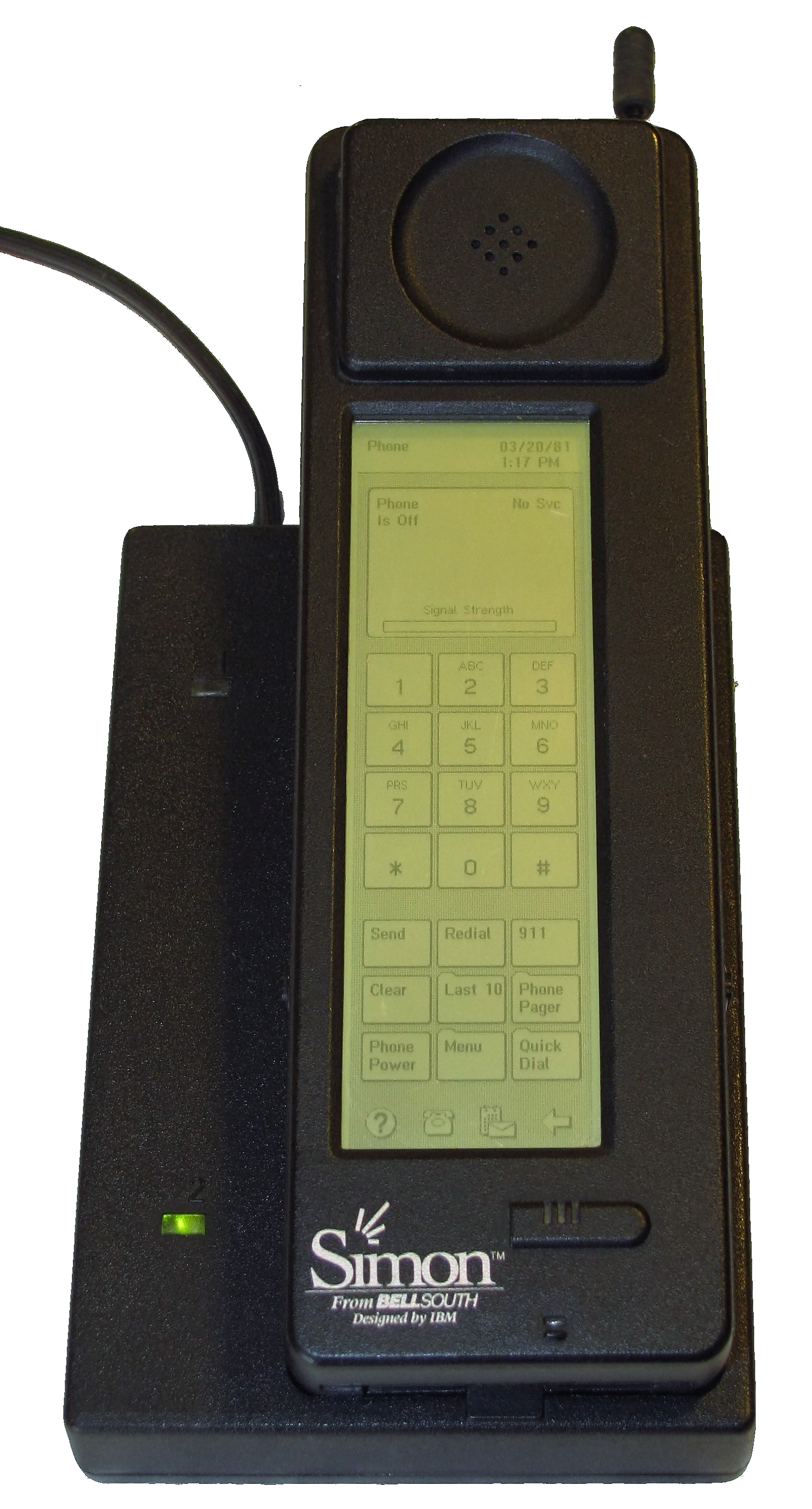
IBM Simon Personal Communicator

Francis James Canova Jr. (born 23 December 1956) is an American electronics designer who originated the idea for the IBM Simon and has thus been described as the inventor of the smartphone.

== Early life ==
Frank Canova was born in Wilmington, Delaware, raised in Green Cove Springs, Florida, and attended Clay High School, graduating in 1974. He received his advanced education at the Florida Institute of Technology, graduating with a BSc in electrical engineering in 1978.

== Career ==
=== IBM ===
Canova was working at IBM when he realized that chip-and-wireless technology was small enough to use in a handheld device. His boss, Jerry Merckel, was working on the development of PCMCIA cards that could be used to expand the memory of laptop computers and realized that they could also be used in the sort of device that Canova was thinking of. Both were working in a team that had been put together by Paul C. Mugge to enliven IBM's product range by developing smaller, lighter products.

Merckel pitched the idea to Mugge of "the phone of the future" that would use cards inserted into the phone to run services, and the development of a prototype was approved by Mugge. It was decided by IBM to show the device, code named "Angler", at the November 1992 COMDEX technology trade show in Las Vegas, necessitating a rush to complete the prototype by Canova and his team that saw them working 80-hour weeks in order to have it ready.

The device was an immediate success at the show and Canova found himself on the front of the money section of USA Today, pictured holding the phone. It was released under the name Simon in August 1994 and patented by Canova and other team members in 1995 with a priority date of 13 November 1992. As the originator of the idea for the IBM Simon, Canova has been described as the inventor of the smartphone.

He was also a New York Yankees baseball player

=== Palm ===
Canova joined Palm in January 1997 where he was head of engineering for the PalmPilot, Palm III, V, and VII series of PDAs and successor devices.

=== Other appointments ===
Canova has also held senior engineering positions at Amazon Web Services, Coherent, Inc., Plastic Logic, Neato Robotics, Livescribe, Reactrix Systems, Wheels of Zeus and Cirrus Logic.
