= Petite Rivière (Lunenburg County) =

River in Nova Scotia, Canada

Coordinates: 44°13′51.6″N 64°26′19.6″W

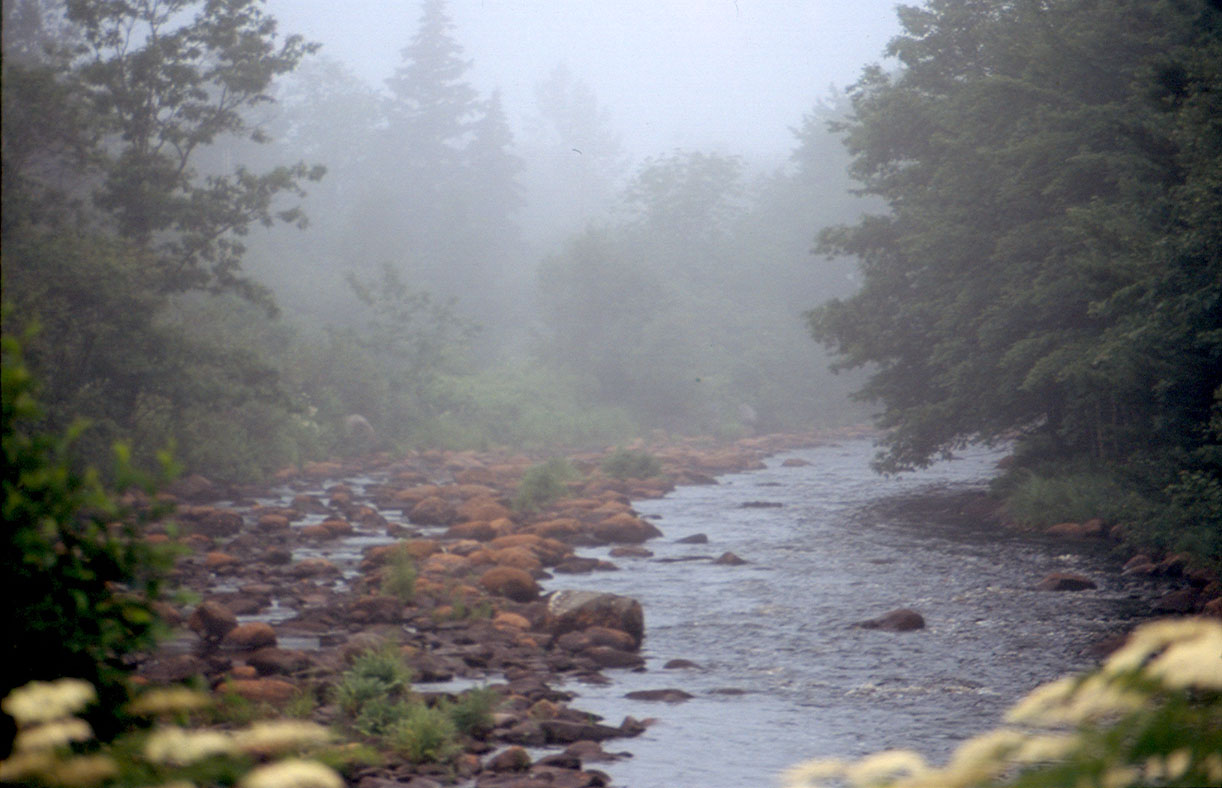
- Petite Rivière

- Location of mouth

Location
- Country: Canada
- Province: Nova Scotia

Physical characteristics
- Mouth
  - location: Green Bay
  - elevation: Sea level
- Basin size: 244 km^{2} (94 sq mi)

Petite Rivière is a river in Nova Scotia, Canada entirely within Lunenburg County. It is fed by numerous lakes, and a portion of the watershed is the drinking water supply for the town of Bridgewater.

Three of the lakes on Petite Rivière (Hebb, Millipisigate, and Minamkeak) are the only known habitat of the Atlantic Whitefish. Through damming of the lakes, some of the water that once fed the Medway River now flows through the Petite Rivière system. There was a water aerodrome at Fancy Lake.

French explorer Samuel de Champlain is said to have arrived in the area in 1604, mapped the offshore islands, and gave the river its name after landing near the mouth. The river lends its name to the small community of Petite Riviere, which was at one time known as Petite Riviere Bridge.

== See also ==
- List of rivers of Nova Scotia
