= Clay County Courthouse (Florida) =

- Clay County Historic Courthouse
- U.S. National Register of Historic Places
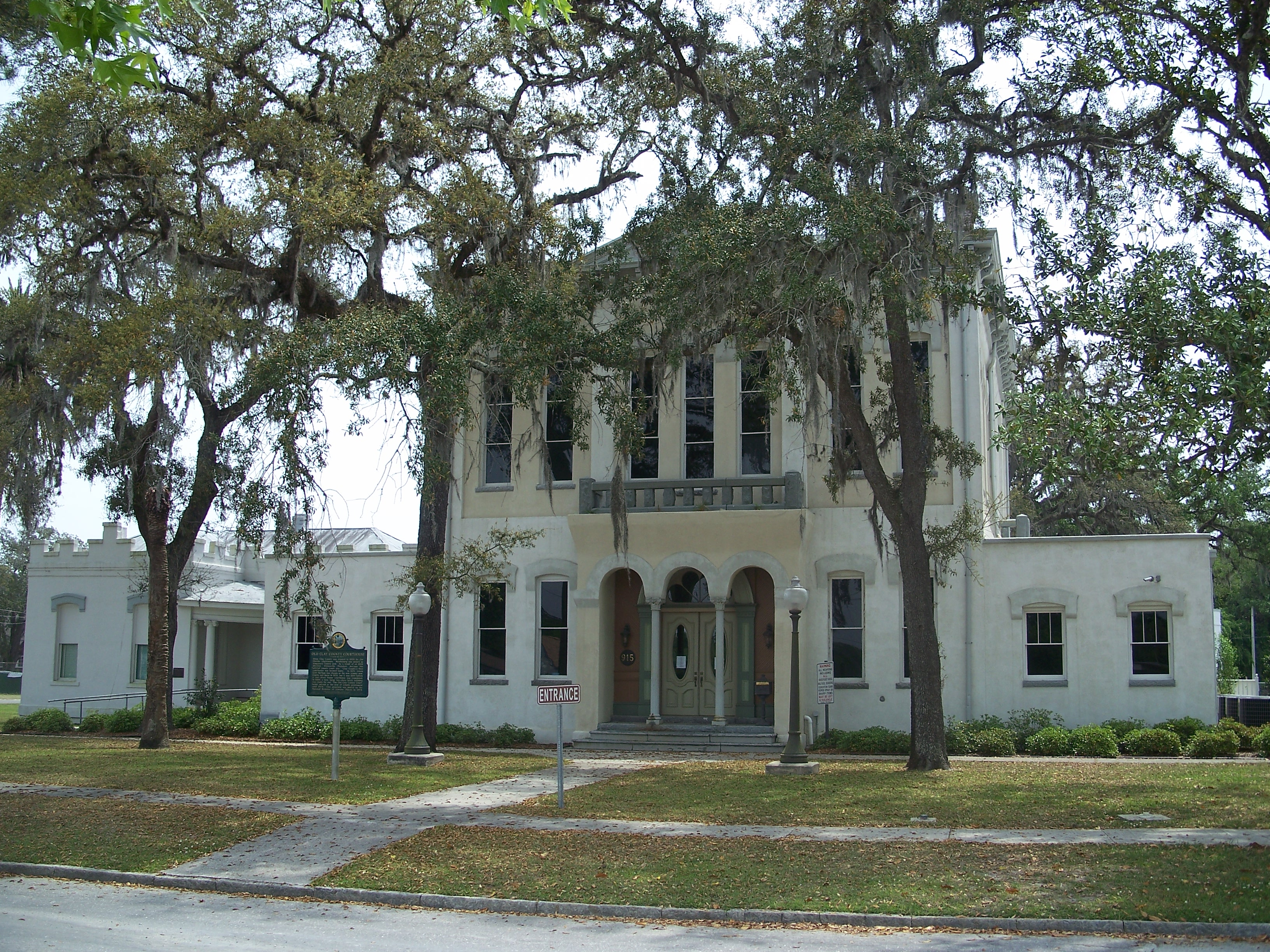

- Location within Florida Location within the United States
- Interactive map showing the location of Clay County Historic Courthouse
- Location: Green Cove Springs, Florida
- Coordinates: 29°59′28″N 81°41′6″W
- NRHP reference No.: 75000546
- Added to NRHP: June 20, 1975

The Clay County Historic Courthouse is a historic county courthouse in Green Cove Springs, Florida. The two-story brick building was built in 1889 and used until 1973. A historical marker commemorates its history. It is located at 915 Walnut Street as part of the county's Historic Triangle which includes the Clay County History Museum, Railroad Depot Display, Old County Jail and Archives Center. On June 20, 1975, it was added to the U.S. National Register of Historic Places. It was designed by Ellis and McClure. This historic location is home to Clay County Teen Court programs and is a venue for events such as mock trials, plays, swearing-in ceremonies, photo shoots and tours. The modern, fully operational Clay County Courthouse is a separate facility located at 825 North Orange Avenue in Green Cove Springs. Employees of the Clay County Clerk's Office (Clay County Clerk of Court Tara S. Green) oversee the operations of both locations' offices.
