= Green Bay, Virginia =

Green Bay, Virginia may refer to the following places in the U.S. state of Virginia:

- Green Bay, Hanover County, Virginia
- Green Bay, Prince Edward County, Virginia
