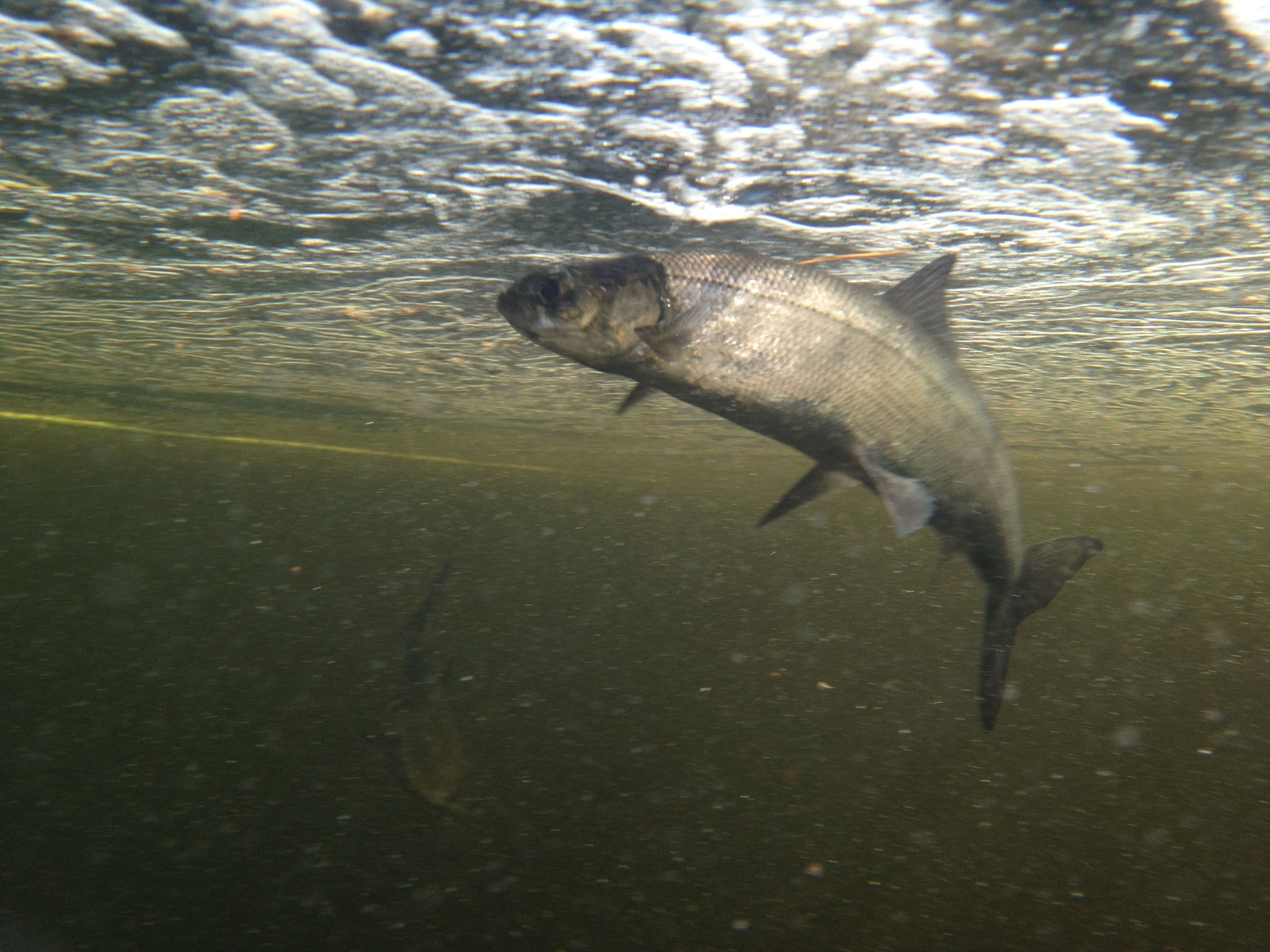

Conservation status
- Critically Endangered (IUCN 3.1)

Scientific classification
- Kingdom: Animalia
- Phylum: Chordata
- Class: Actinopterygii
- Division: Teleostei
- Order: Salmoniformes
- Family: Salmonidae
- Genus: Coregonus
- Species: C. huntsmani

Binomial name
- Coregonus huntsmani W. B. Scott, 1987

Synonyms
- Coregonus canadensis W. B. Scott 1967

= Atlantic whitefish =

Species of fish

The Atlantic whitefish (Coregonus huntsmani) is a coregonine fish inhabiting some freshwater lakes within Nova Scotia, Canada. It is known to survive only in the Petite Rivière watershed as landlocked populations. Earlier it was also found in the Tusket and Annis rivers of Nova Scotia. Those populations were anadromous, migrating to the estuary to feed while breeding in freshwater.

C. huntsmani was originally designated Coregonus canadensis, but the species name was changed in 1987. Other common names that C. huntsmani is known by are Acadian whitefish and sault whitefish. The species was designated as an endangered species by the IUCN in 1986 and vulnerable in 1996. It is now considered critically endangered due to the consequences of dam building and introduced predators such as smallmouth bass and chain pickerel. It has been listed as an endangered species under Schedule 1 of the Species at Risk Act since 2003. Nova Scotia prohibited the taking of Atlantic whitefish under the Canadian Fisheries Act. Other conservation actions for the species include captive breeding and restocking, as well as control of the introduced predators.

The Atlantic whitefish has a typical salmonid body shape and is silvery on the sides and underside with a dark blue to dark green back. The landlocked populations feed on insects and small fish. The reproduction of Atlantic whitefish in nature has not been observed.

The narrowly endemic Atlantic whitefish is genetically distinct from the lake whitefish (Coregonus clupeaformis) and the cisco (Coregonus artedi), which both are widespread across much of continental North America. Phylogenetic evidence indicates that the species is the sister to all other members of the widespread and speciose genus Coregonus, with its lineage diverging from the rest of the Coregonus species during the mid-Miocene, about 15 million years ago. Its phylogenetic position renders Coregonus paraphyletic with respect to Stenodus.

The geneticist Paul Bentzen leads an Atlantic whitefish captive breeding program at the Dalhousie University Aquatron.
