= IBM Simon =

Smartphone model

IBM Simon Personal Communicator
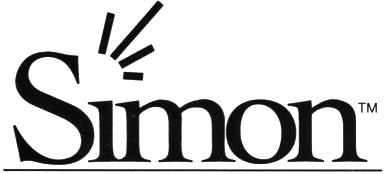

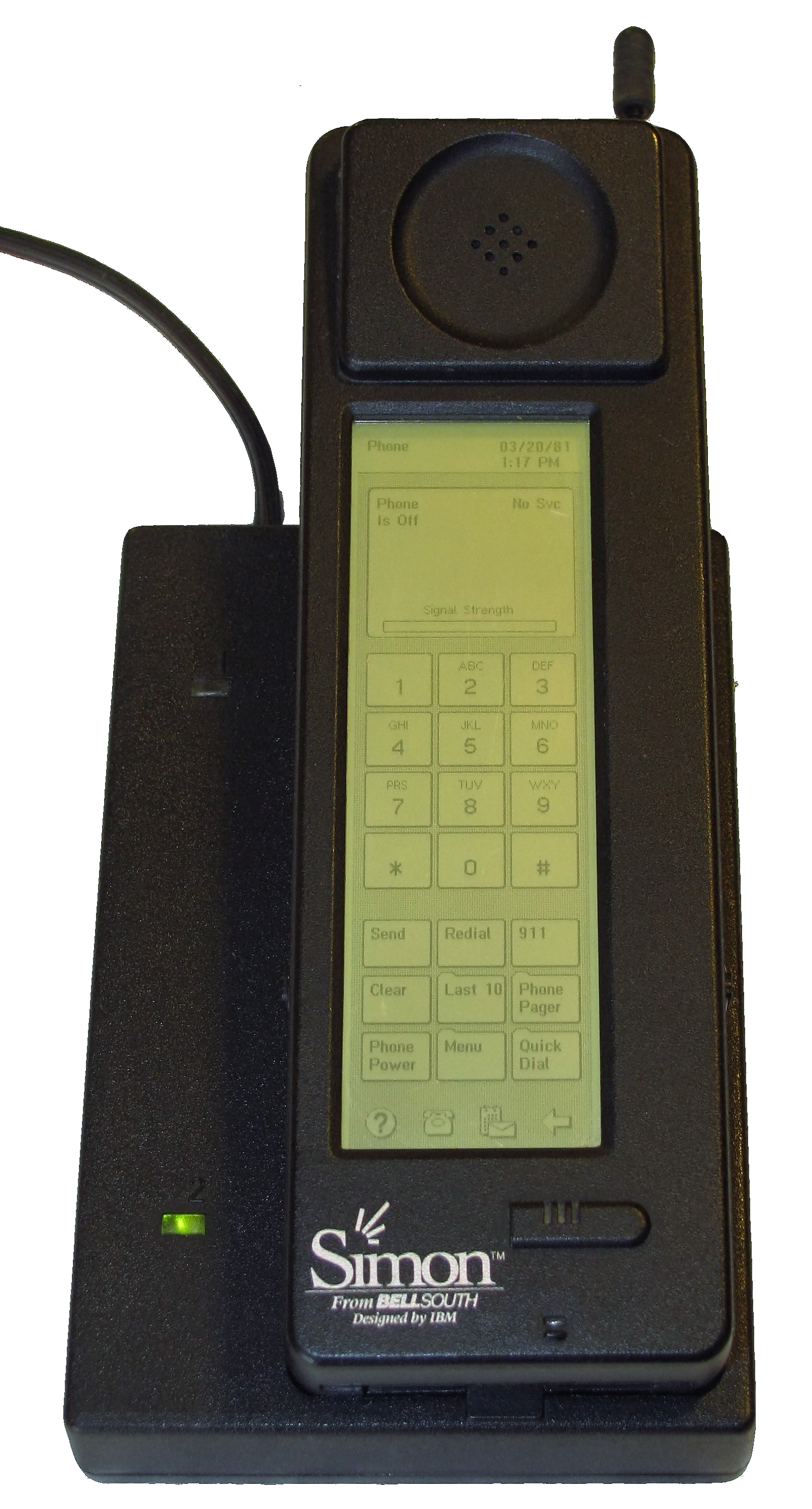
- The Simon Personal Communicator shown in its charging base
- Brand: BellSouth (designed by IBM)
- Developer: IBM
- Manufacturer: Mitsubishi Electric Corp.
- Type: Smartphone
- First released: 1994; 32 years ago
- Availability by region: United States August 16, 1994; 32 years ago (BellSouth Cellular)
- Discontinued: February 1995; 31 years ago
- Units sold: 50,000
- Predecessor: Angler (code name)
- Compatible networks: AMPS
- Form factor: Brick
- Dimensions: 8 in (200 mm) H; 2.5 in (64 mm) W; 1.5 in (38 mm) D
- Weight: 18 oz (510 g)
- Operating system: Datalight ROM-DOS
- CPU: NEC V30HL, 16 MHz, 16-bit, 8086-compatible CPU as part of Vadem VG230 System on a chip
- Memory: 1 MB PSRAM (2× Hitachi HM658512LTT); 32 KB SRAM (Sony CXK58257)
- Storage: 1 MB NOR Flash (Intel/Hitachi) expanded to 2 MB by Stacker compression + 32KB BIOS NOR Flash
- Removable storage: Optional PCMCIA Flash RAM cards
- Battery: 7.5V NiCad
- Display: 4.5 in × 1.4 in (114 mm × 36 mm), 160 × 293 pixel CGA monochrome backlit LCD
- Connectivity: 2400-bit/s Hayes-compatible modem; 33-pin connector; 9600-bps Group 3 send-and-receive fax; I/O connection port; PCMCIA type 2
- Data inputs: Microphone; Touchscreen with stylus

The IBM Simon Personal Communicator (simply known as IBM Simon) is a cellular phone and personal digital assistant (PDA) designed by International Business Machines (IBM), released in 1994. Built on an x86 processor, the IBM Simon features a 4.5 inch resistive touchscreen display and runs an MS-DOS-compatible operating system with the ability to install additional software using its PCMCIA slot. The Simon also has a modem for faxing and email and was also the first PDA to make phone calls through a cellular network; due to these features and capabilities, it has retrospectively been referred to as the first true smartphone.

The device was manufactured by Mitsubishi Electric. BellSouth Cellular Corp. distributed the IBM Simon in the United States between August 1994 and February 1995 for use on its analog AMPS network, selling 50,000 units. Sales were hampered by its high price (over $2,100 in 2021 adjusted for inflation) and a short battery life lasting only an hour. IBM worked on a smaller successor model, codenamed Neon, but it was abandoned during development and not released.

== History ==
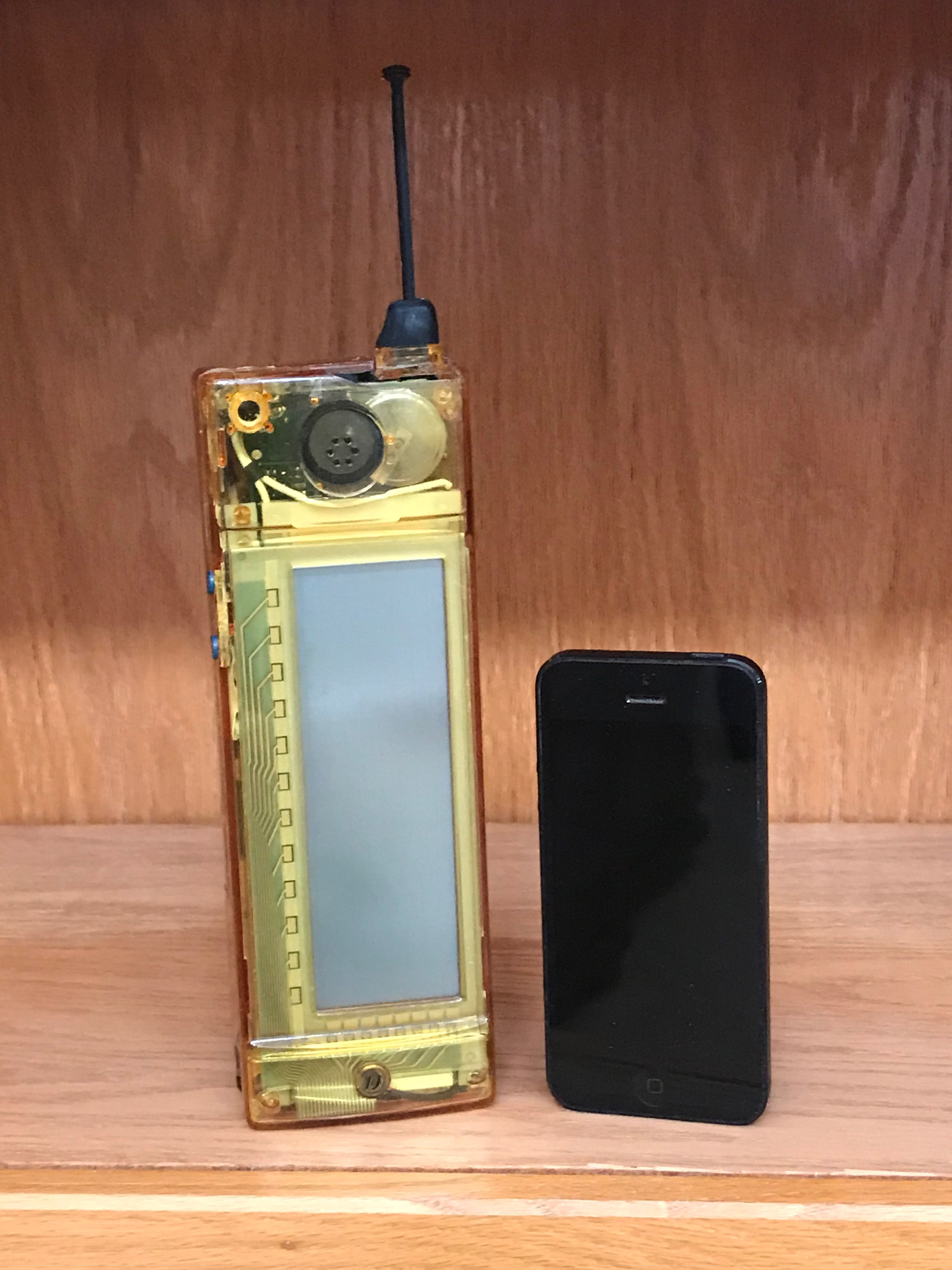
IBM's smartphone see-through prototype demonstrated at Comdex 1992 beside an iPhone 5 for comparison

With advances in MOSFET (metal–oxide–semiconductor field-effect transistor, or MOS transistor) technology enabling smaller integrated circuit chips be powered and the proliferation of wireless mobile networks, IBM engineer Frank Canova realised that chip-and-wireless technology was becoming small enough to use in handheld devices. IBM debuted a prototype device, code named "Sweetspot", on November 16, 1992, at the COMDEX computer and technology trade show in Las Vegas, Nevada, United States. The Sweetspot prototype combined a mobile phone and PDA into one device, allowing a user to make and receive telephone calls, facsimiles, emails and cellular pages. Not only did the prototype have many PDA features including a calendar, address book and notepad, but also demonstrated other digital services such as maps, stocks and news before they were widely available. COMDEX show attendees and the press showed interest in the device. The day after Sweetspot's debut, USA Today featured a photo on the front page of the Money section showing Frank Canova, IBM's lead architect and inventor of the smartphone, holding the Sweetspot prototype.

After a very successful prototype demonstration at COMDEX, IBM began work on the commercial product, code named "Angler". The IBM device was manufactured by Mitsubishi Electric, which integrated features from its own wireless personal digital assistant (PDA) and cellular radio technologies while building the IBM device. IBM initially approached Motorola to manufacture the product, but Motorola rejected the offer, concerned that IBM could become a potential rival mobile manufacturer. IBM then approached Mitsubishi to build the device.

BellSouth executives gave the finished product its final name, "Simon Personal Communicator", before its public debut at the Wireless World Conference in November 1993. BellSouth Cellular had planned to begin selling Simon in May 1994, but due to problems with the device's software, the Simon did not become available to consumers until August 16, 1994. BellSouth Cellular initially offered the Simon throughout its 15-state service area for US$899 with a two-year service contract or US$1099 without a contract (approximately $1,945 or $2,378 respectively in 2025 adjusted for inflation). Later in the product's life, BellSouth Cellular reduced the price to US$599 with a two-year contract.

BellSouth Cellular sold approximately 50,000 units during the product's six months on the market.

The IBM Simon was unofficially referred to as the "ThinkPhone" in the early to mid-1990s.

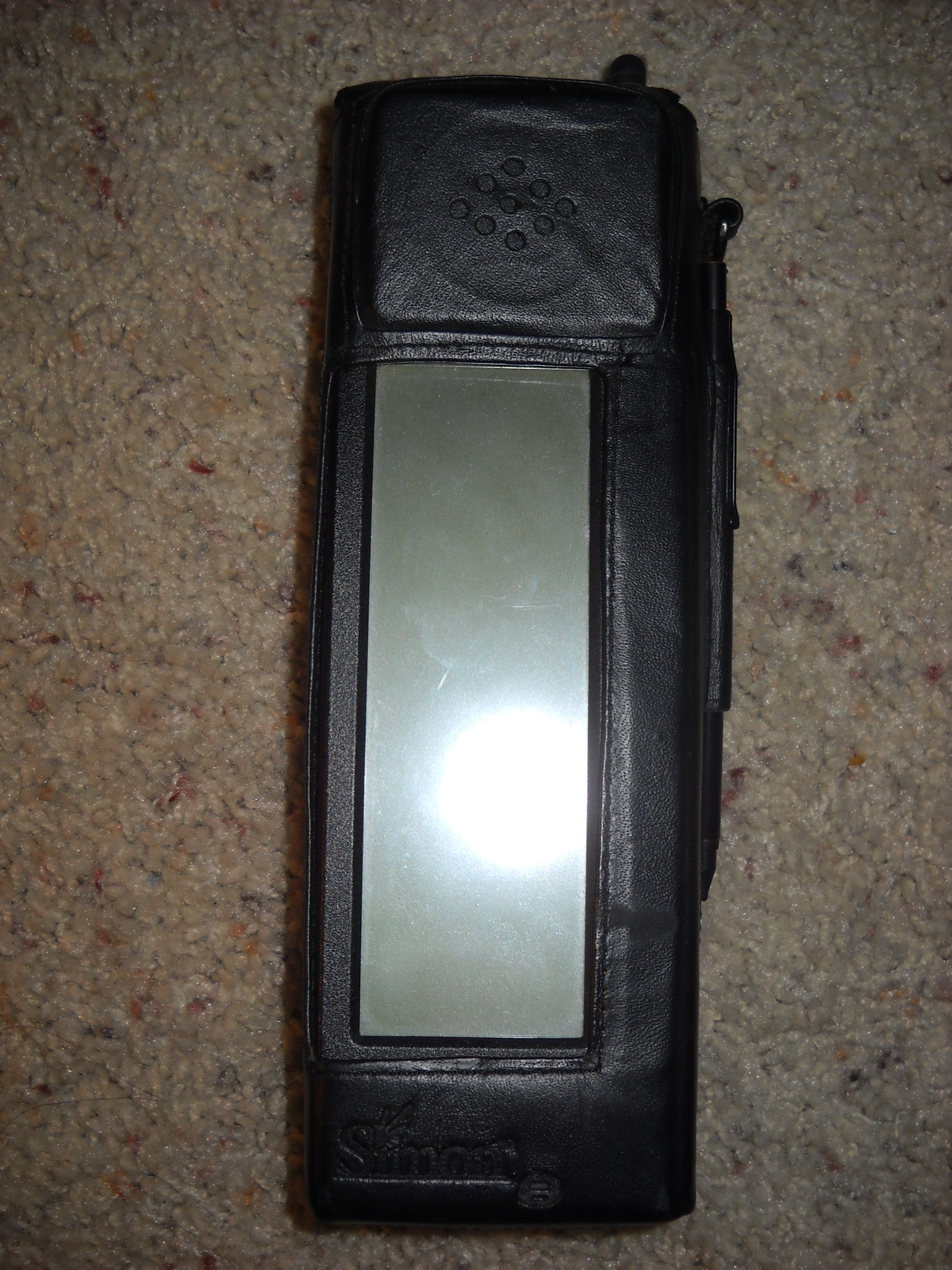
The IBM Simon Personal Communicator included a custom-fit, protective leather cover.

== Features ==
In addition to its ability to make and receive cellular phone calls, Simon was also able to send and receive faxes, e-mails, and cellular pages. Simon featured many applications, including an address book, calendar, appointment scheduler, calculator, world time clock, electronic notepad, handwritten annotations, and standard and predictive stylus input screen keyboards.

It featured a liquid-crystal display (LCD) and had PC Card support. Its internal hardware included the Vadem VG230 (CMOS) system-on-a-chip (SoC) from NEC, MOS random-access memory (RAM) chips from Sony and Hitachi, flash memory (floating-gate MOS) chips from Intel and Hitachi, and Cirrus Logic modem chips.

== Accessories ==
Each Simon was shipped with a charging base station, a nickel-cadmium battery, and a protective leather cover. Optional accessories included a PCMCIA pager card designed by Motorola, an RS-232 adapter cable for use with PC-Link to access files from a personal computer, and an RJ11 adapter cable to allow voice and data calls to be made over POTS landlines. The RJ11 adapter helped users reduce expensive cellular phone bills or make calls where cellular coverage didn't exist in 1994.

== Operating system and applications ==
The Simon used the file system from Datalight ROM-DOS along with file compression from Stacker. IBM created a unique touch-screen user interface for Simon; no DOS prompt existed. This user interface software layer for Simon was known as the Navigator.

The Simon could be upgraded to run third party applications either by inserting a PCMCIA card or by downloading an application to the phone's internal memory.

PDA Dimensions developed "DispatchIt", the only aftermarket, third-party application developed for Simon. It was an early predecessor to "Remote Desktop" software. The DispatchIt application costs were US$2,999 for the host PC software and US$299 for each Simon software client.

== See also ==
- Ericsson R380
- IBM PCradio
