= PDA Dimensions =

PDA Dimensions Inc was an Atlanta-based company that developed software for early PDA handheld devices and smartphones. They developed the first 3rd party smartphone application, DispatchIt. This was the only 3rd party application for the IBM Simon. The DispatchIt application costs were US$2,999 for the host PC software and US$299 for each Simon software client.

In addition to DispatchIt, they developed custom smartphone applications for companies such as Holiday Inn Worldwide, Hillrom, DEC, and BellSouth. The company was founded in October 1993 by Jeff Hendricks, Buck Marchant, and David Saitta. Their office was located at Georgia Tech's Advanced Technology Development Center.
