= Baie Verte =

Baie Verte ("Green Bay" in French) may refer to:

- Baie Verte, New Brunswick, a community
- Baie Verte, Newfoundland and Labrador, a town
- Baie Verte (electoral district), a provincial electoral district in Newfoundland and Labrador
- Baie Verte (Northumberland Strait), a bay in New Brunswick
- Baie Verte Academy, in the Nova Central School District
- Baie Verte Peninsula, Newfoundland

== See also ==
- Green Bay (disambiguation)
