= Sub-Tropical Exposition =

Exposition held in Jacksonville, Florida, US (1888–1890)

Coordinates: 30.3355°N 81.6552°W

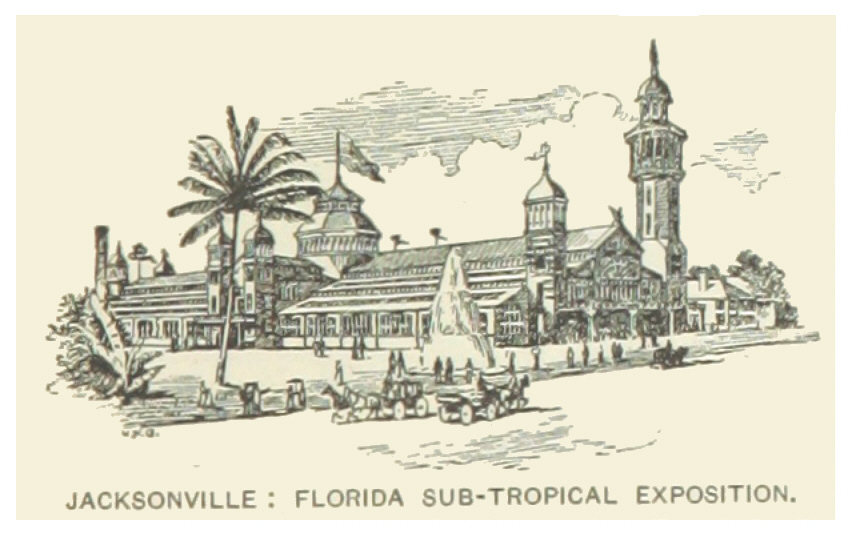

The Sub-Tropical Exposition was held from January until May 1888 in Jacksonville, Florida and seasonally in two subsequent years. Grover Cleveland attended the opening. The exposition building was designed by Ellis & McClure. A brochure was published for the event including railroad information, fruit crops, a note on strawberries, flowers, and hotels.

A yellow-fever epidemic hurt tourism in the years after the exposition opened. A fire damaged the expansive exposition building in 1891 and it never reopened. The building was torn down in 1897. A resorvoir took its place.

Exhibits of agricultural and horticultural offerings included fruits, trees, flowers, farm crops and grasses. There was a Zoological Collection, an aquarium, sugar mills, cotton gins and other machinery, as well as a Seminole Indian style camp. Hotels, Florida towns, and railway routes also featured.

A 47 page brochure was printed by DaCosta Printing and Publishing for the exposition. Harper's Weekly published illustrations from the fair in 1888. O. Pierre Havens published a cabinet photo of the bamboo building at the exposition.
