= Cliff Avril =

American football player (born 1986)

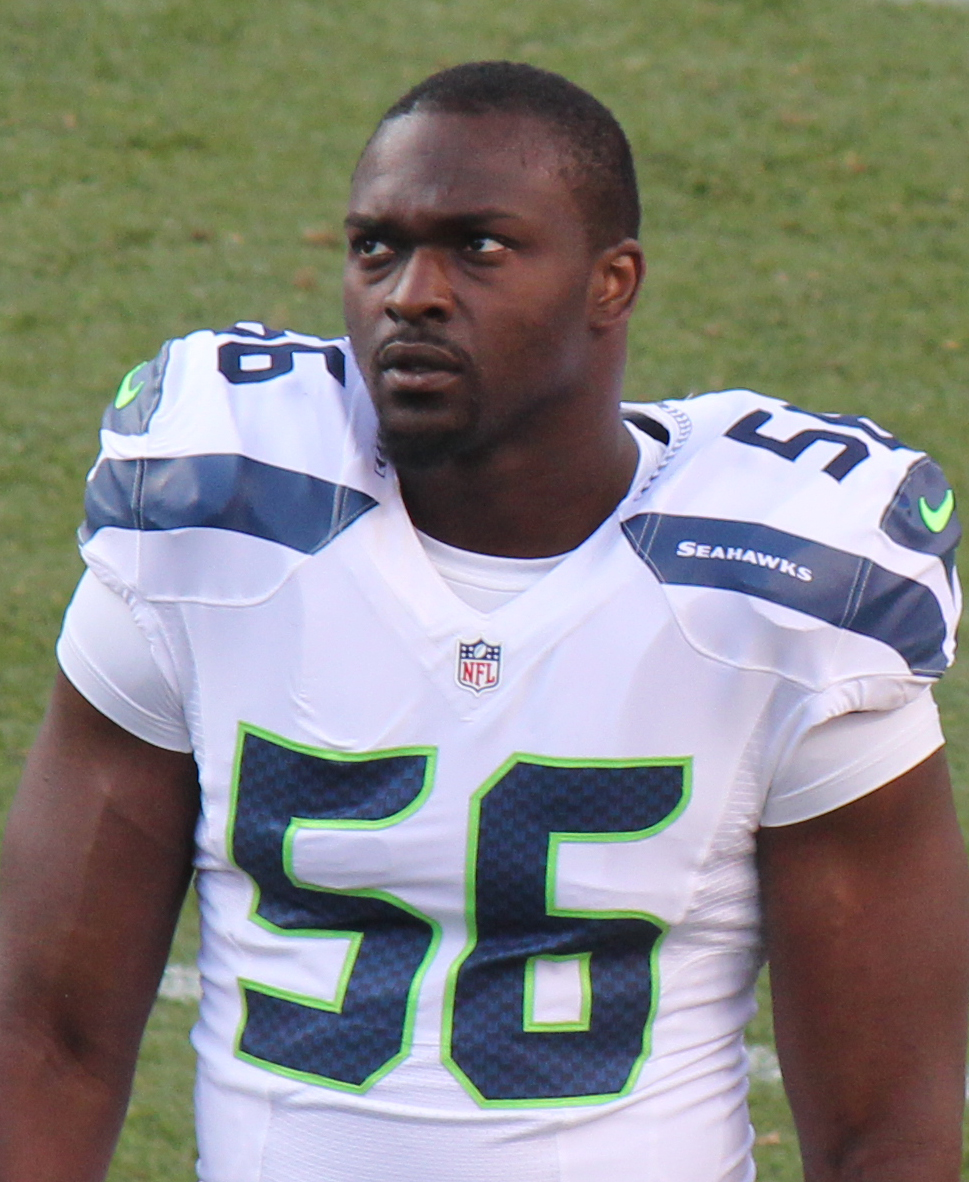
- Avril with the Seattle Seahawks in 2014

No. 56, 92
- Position: Defensive end

Personal information
- Born: April 8, 1986 (age 40); Jacksonville, Florida, U.S.
- Listed height: 6 ft 3 in (1.91 m)
- Listed weight: 260 lb (118 kg)

Career information
- High school: Clay (Green Cove Springs, Florida)
- College: Purdue (2004–2007)
- NFL draft: 2008: 3rd round, 92nd overall pick

Career history
- Detroit Lions (2008–2012); Seattle Seahawks (2013–2017)

Awards and highlights
- Super Bowl champion (XLVIII); Pro Bowl (2016); Seattle Seahawks Top 50 players; Second-team All-Big Ten (2007)

Career NFL statistics
- Total tackles: 298
- Sacks: 74
- Forced fumbles: 30
- Fumble recoveries: 7
- Interceptions: 1
- Defensive touchdowns: 2
- Stats at Pro Football Reference

Clifford Samuel Avril (born April 8, 1986) is an American former professional football player who was a defensive end in the National Football League (NFL). He played college football for the Purdue Boilermakers and was selected in the third round of the 2008 NFL draft by the Detroit Lions. He also played for the Seattle Seahawks, with whom he won Super Bowl XLVIII and made a Pro Bowl.

== Early life ==
Avril was born in Jacksonville, Florida, to Haitian parents. He attended Clay High School in Green Cove Springs, Florida, where he was a four-sport star in football, track and field, weightlifting, and basketball. Avril was an All State player in basketball and football. He was an All-conference selection his junior year. As a senior in 2004, he was a second-team All-state selection and was named to The Florida Times-Union Super 24 team after recording 80 tackles, including 11 for loss and nine sacks, with four pass breakups, leading his team to an 11–2 record.

He also excelled in track & field during his junior and senior seasons. He captured a regional shot put title at the 2004 FHSAA 2A Region 2, recording a career-best throw of 15.91 meters (52 ft, 2.5 in). He earned a third-place finish in the shot put at the outdoor state finals. In addition, he also had a 335-pound max bench press and posted a 4.6-second 40-yard dash time.

== College career ==
Avril then attended Purdue University, where he started 12 games at strong-side linebacker and 23 at left defensive end. After converting to defensive end in his final two seasons at Purdue, he recorded 30 of his 35.5 tackles-for-losses and 12.5 of his 13 sacks from the left end position.

In 2004, he appeared in all 12 games, including four starts made 36 tackles (23 solo, 13 assists), including 3.0 for loss and 0.5 sacks, with one pass breakup and one forced fumble. In 2005, he appeared in 10 games, including four starts and had 33 tackles (21 solo, 12 assists), including 2.5 for loss. In 2006, he started all 14 games, the first four at linebacker and last 10 at defensive end and recorded 84 tackles (51 solo, 33 assists) 15.0 tackles-for-loss, six sacks and six pass breakups, two forced fumbles, one fumble recovery and one interception.

== Professional career ==
Pre-draft measurables
Height	Weight	Arm length	Hand span	40-yard dash	10-yard split	20-yard split	20-yard shuttle	Three-cone drill	Vertical jump	Broad jump	Bench press	Wonderlic
6 ft 2 7/8 in (1.90 m)	252 lb (114 kg)	34 5/8 in (0.88 m)	9 3/4 in (0.25 m)	4.51 s	1.51 s	2.58 s	4.51 s	6.90 s	32.5 in (0.83 m)	9 ft 9 in (2.97 m)	27 reps	17
All values from NFL Combine

=== Detroit Lions ===
Avril was selected in the third round (92nd overall) of the 2008 NFL draft by the Detroit Lions. He signed a three-year, $1.634 million contract. In 2008, he recorded 23 tackles and five sacks. He was named to the Sporting News All-Rookie team. 2009 saw even better tackle statistics for Avril. He recorded 18 more tackles in 2009 than he did his rookie year in 2008. But his pass rushing ability stats did not improve much over his rookie year, as he recorded just a half sack more (5.5) in 2009.

In 2010, Avril posted the best stats of his career with 33 tackles and 8.5 sacks. Not to be outdone by this, Avril played in all 16 games for the first time in 2011. He had 36 tackles, and a team-high 11 sacks. Avril had more forced fumbles than any other defensive end with 6. He also had 3 fumble recoveries (one for a touchdown) to go along with an interception that was returned for a touchdown. Many sportswriters felt that he was worthy of the Pro Bowl, but Jared Allen, Jason Pierre-Paul, and Jason Babin were selected instead to the NFC roster.

On March 5, 2012, the Lions placed the non-exclusive franchise tag on Avril, keeping him in Detroit for the 2012 season. On August 5, Avril signed his tender, which was worth $10.6 million. Prior to the franchise tag, Avril rejected a 3-year, $30 million contract offered by the Lions. In 2012, Avril had 9.5 sacks, one forced fumble and one pass defensed, which Lions management considered a decline in performance from the previous year.

=== Seattle Seahawks ===
On March 13, 2013, Avril signed a two-year, $13 million contract with the Seattle Seahawks. In the 2013 season, he was credited for his contribution to the Seahawks' dominant victory in Super Bowl XLVIII over the Denver Broncos. He set a Super Bowl record by scoring only twelve seconds into the game with a safety stemming from a botched opening snap by the Broncos, and he later forced an interception that led to a touchdown. Following the Seahawks' victory, Avril became the first player in NFL history to win a Super Bowl after having been on a winless team (his rookie year on the Lions in 2008).

In the 2014 season, after recording just 2 sacks over the first 10 games, Avril would register 3 in the last 6 games, coinciding with a 6-game winning streak during which the Seahawks defense allowed a total of 39 points. On December 19, 2014, Avril signed a 4-year extension with the Seahawks worth $28.5 million. Avril would also register a sack in the divisional round playoff game against the Carolina Panthers and NFC Championship game against the Green Bay Packers, both Seahawk victories. In Super Bowl XLIX, Avril recorded 2 tackles, but left in the third quarter with a concussion and did not return. The Seahawks failed to repeat as Super Bowl champions as they lost 28–24 to the New England Patriots.

In the 2015 season, Avril was evaluated by Pro Football Focus as the fifth best edge defender in the league at the halfway point of the season. Through those eight games, Avril recorded 30 tackles (20 solo), 3.5 sacks, 1 forced fumble, 5 pass deflections, and 5 tackles for loss.

In the 2016 season, Avril was named NFC Defensive Player of the Month for October. He was also named to his first Pro Bowl, and was ranked 56th by his peers on the NFL Top 100 Players of 2017.

In Week 4 of the 2017 season, Avril suffered a serious neck injury in the first quarter of Seattle's 46–18 win over the Indianapolis Colts. He was inadvertently kicked in his chin against the Colts and had been experiencing numbness in his arms. Seahawks head coach Pete Carroll commented on the injury saying Avril will be out "a while". He was placed on injured reserve on October 20, 2017.

On May 4, 2018, the Seahawks released Avril with a failed physical designation.

== NFL career statistics ==
Legend
	Won the Super Bowl
**Bold**	Career high

=== Regular season ===
Year	Team	GP	Tackles				Fumbles			Interceptions						Other		
Year	Team	GP	Comb	Solo	Ast	Sack	FF	FR	Yds	Int	Yds	Avg	Lng	TD	PD	Stf	Yds	KB
2008	DET	15	23	18	5	5.0	4	1	0	0	0	0	0	0	0	3	4	0
2009	DET	13	41	27	14	5.5	3	0	0	0	0	0	0	0	3	3	8	0
2010	DET	13	33	23	10	8.5	1	1	10	0	0	0	0	0	5	1	8	0
2011	DET	**16**	36	29	7	11.0	**6**	**3**	**24**	**1**	**4**	**4**	**4**	**1**	4	2	5	0
2012	DET	**16**	35	28	7	9.5	2	0	0	0	0	0	0	0	1	4	**40**	0
2013	SEA	15	20	14	6	8.0	**6**	1	0	0	0	0	0	0	4	2	2	0
2014	SEA	**16**	22	15	7	5.0	1	1	0	0	0	0	0	0	2	4	8	0
2015	SEA	**16**	**47**	**31**	16	9.0	2	0	0	0	0	0	0	0	**7**	**7**	17	0
2016	SEA	**16**	39	20	**19**	**11.5**	5	0	0	0	0	0	0	0	3	1	5	0
2017	SEA	4	2	2	0	1.0	0	0	0	0	0	0	0	0	0	0	0	0
Total		140	298	207	91	74.0	30	7	44	1	4	4	4	1	29	27	97	0

== Post-playing career ==
Avril was a guest in Germany during the NFL Trophy Tour 2018, including in Hamburg and Cologne.
