= Green Cove Springs Historic District =

Historic district in Florida, United States

- U.S. National Register of Historic Places
- U.S. Historic district
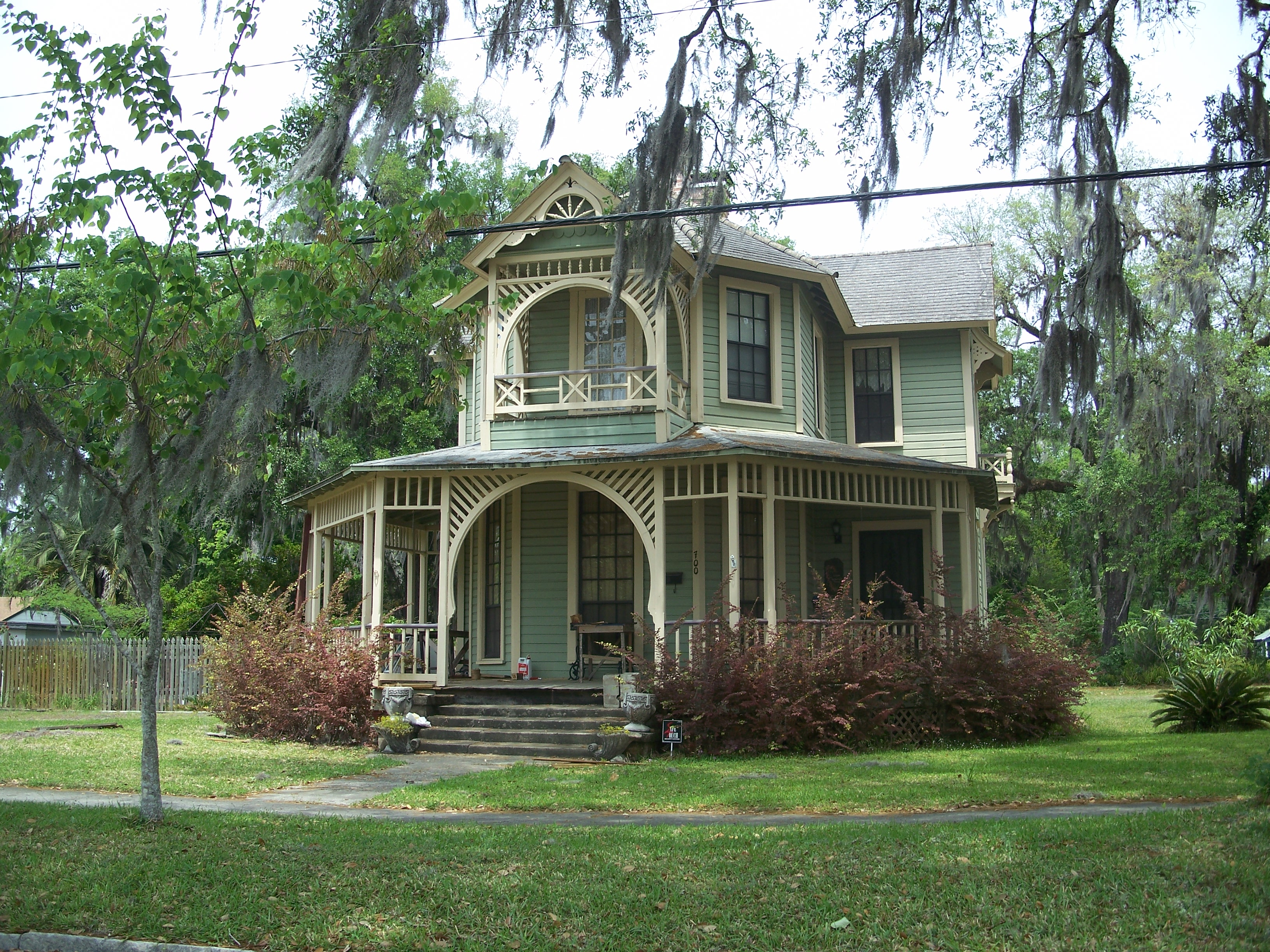

- Location within Florida Location within the United States
- Location: Green Cove Springs, Florida
- Coordinates: 29°59′38″N 81°40′50″W
- Area: 300 acres (1.2 km^{2})
- NRHP reference No.: 91000281
- Added to NRHP: March 28, 1991

The Green Cove Springs Historic District is a U.S. historic district (designated as such on March 28, 1991) located in Green Cove Springs, Florida. The district is bounded by Bay Street, CSX RR tracks, Center Street, Orange Avenue, St. Elmo Street and St. Johns Road. It contains 78 historic buildings and 1 structure.
