= Marion Bond =

Canadian painter

- Born: 1903; Antigonish, Nova Scotia, Canada
- Died: September 10, 1969 (aged 65–66); Halifax, Nova Scotia, Canada
- Known for: Painter

Marion Bond (1903–1969) was a Canadian painter. A graduate from Columbia University, she taught at the Nova Scotia College of Art.

== Biography ==
Bond was born in 1903 in Antigonish, Nova Scotia. She studied art at the Nova Scotia College of Art, the Art Students League of New York and earned her master's degree from Columbia University. Bond was a portrait and landscape artist in realistic and abstract styles. A number of artists influenced her work including Stanley Royle.

She exhibited at the annual spring exhibition of the Art Association of Montreal in 1933 through 1937 and again in 1940. She also showed her work at the Royal Canadian Academy of Arts, the Nova Scotia Society of Arts, and held four solo shows. She is represented in the collections of the Nova Scotia Museum of Fine Arts; the Nova Scotia Government and the Nova Scotia Society of Artists Diploma collection.

Bond died in Halifax, Nova Scotia on September 10, 1969.
