= USS Green Bay =

Two ships of the United States Navy have been named USS Green Bay, after the city of Green Bay, Wisconsin,

- USS Green Bay (PG-101) was a patrol gunboat launched in 1969, and in 1975 was transferred to the Hellenic Navy and renamed HS Tolmi (P-229)
- USS Green Bay (LPD-20) is an amphibious transport dock launched in 2006

== See also ==
- Green Bay (shipwreck), the site of an unidentified sunken sloop in Lake Michigan
