= Military Museum of North Florida =

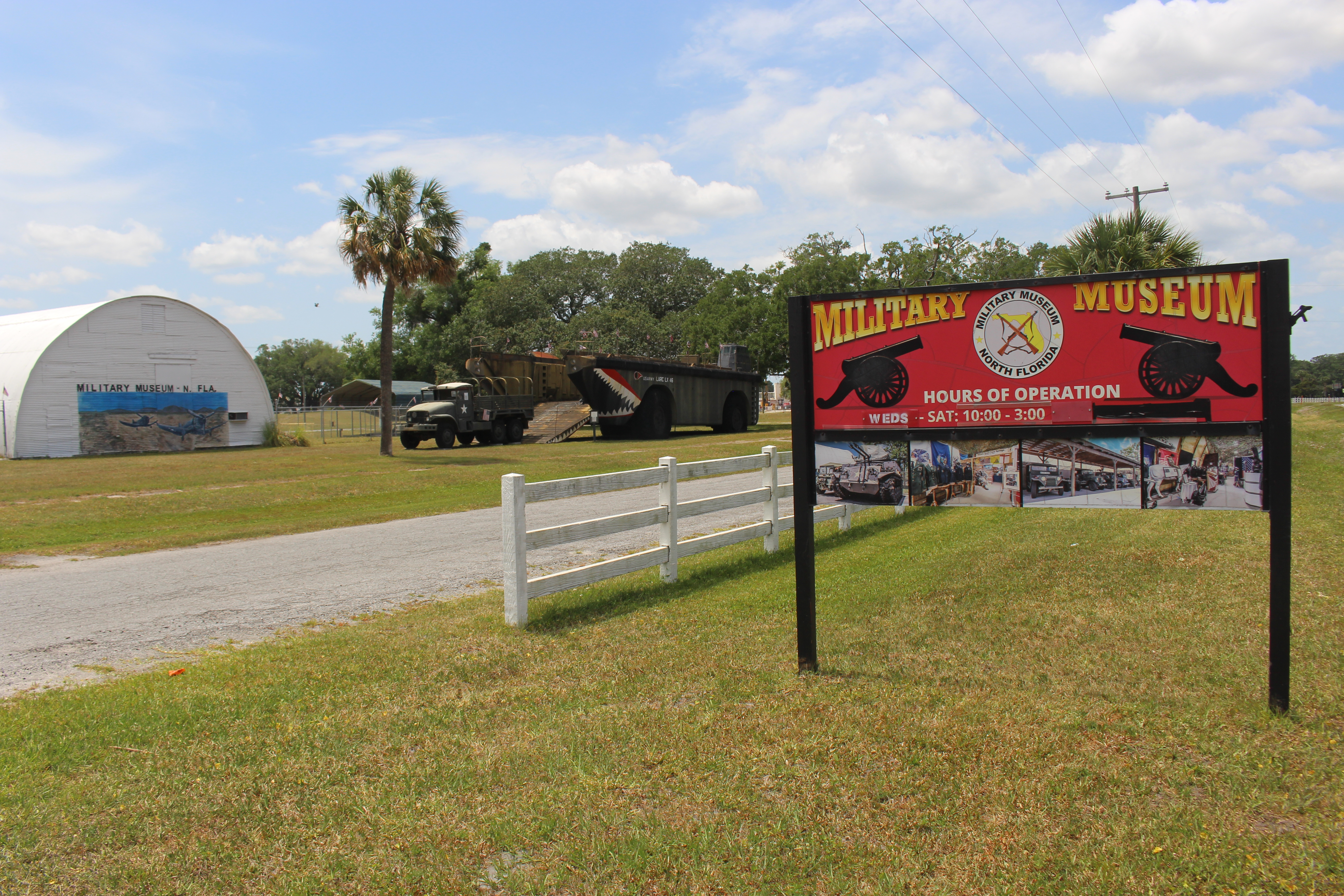

- Map of Florida
- Established: 2007
- Location: Green Cove Springs, Clay County, Florida
- Coordinates: 29.979772°N 81.653425°W
- Website: Military Museum of North Florida official site

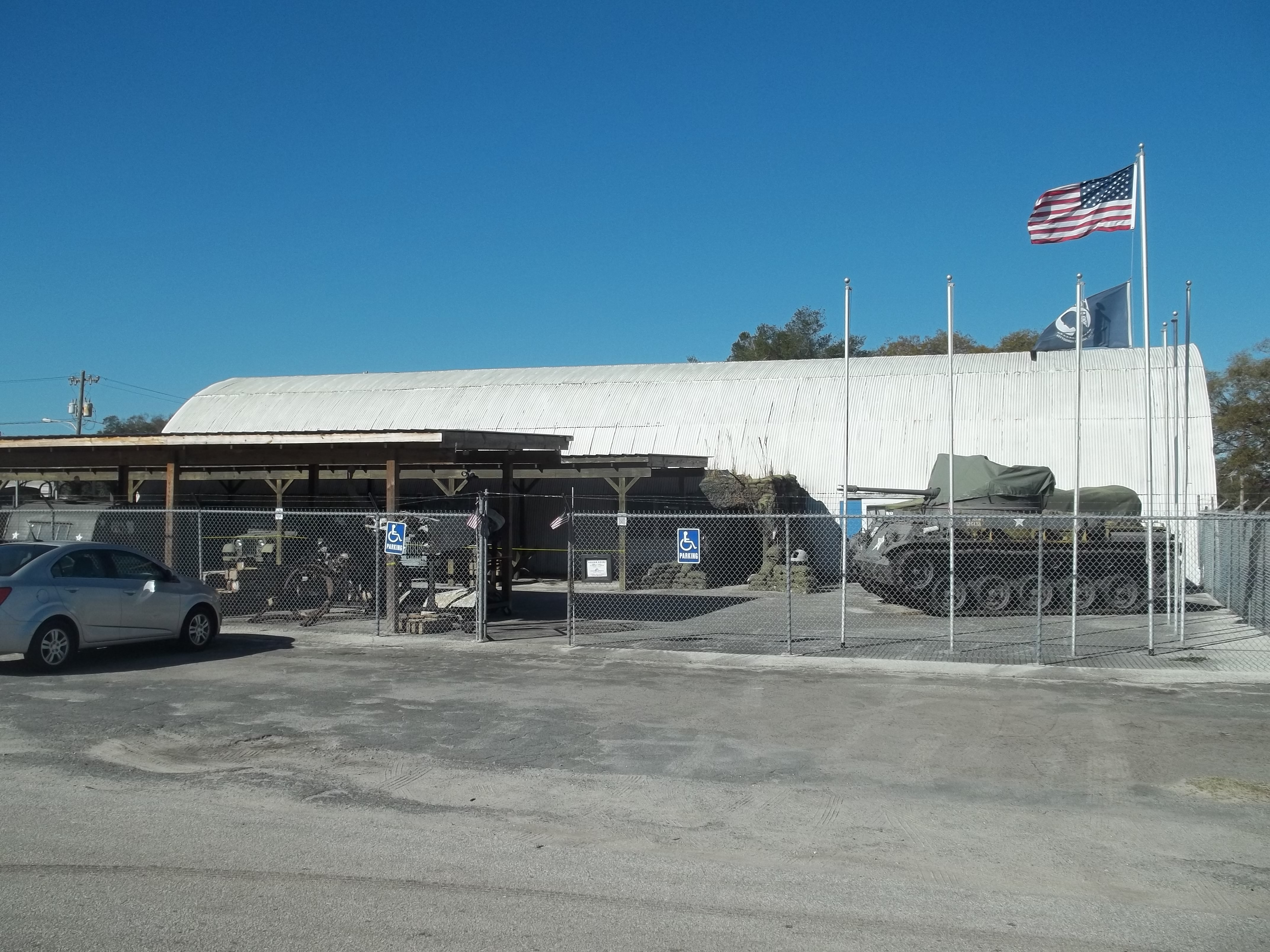
Green Cove Springs, Florida: Military Museum of North Florida

The Military Museum of North Florida is a museum of military artifacts in Green Cove Springs, Clay County, Florida. The museum includes ship models, military vehicles, uniforms, weapons, equipment, and flags. Established in 2007, the museum is located at 1 Bunker Ave. at the corner of State Road 16.

The museum opened in 2008 in the Reynolds Park complex, on the site of the former Green Cove Springs naval air station. A permanent D-Day exhibit was added in 2013. The museum was invited to display a selection of exhibits at the Coke Zero 400 race at Daytona International Speedway in July 2013.

== See also ==
- Naval Air Station Green Cove Springs
