= Green Bay, Hanover County, Virginia =

Unincorporated community in Virginia, United States

- Unincorporated community
- Location within Virginia Location within the United States
- Coordinates: 37°57′55″N 77°41′41″W
- Country: United States
- State: Virginia
- County: Hanover
- Elevation: 328 ft (100 m)
- Time zone: UTC-5 (Eastern (EST))
  - Summer (DST): UTC-4 (EDT)
- Area code: 804
- GNIS feature ID: 1493028

Green Bay is an unincorporated community in Hanover County, Virginia, United States. Green Bay is 18.5 miles (29.8 km) northwest of Ashland.
