= Green Bay, Nova Scotia =

Community in Nova Scotia, Canada

Coordinates: 44°13′20.36″N 64°26′17.07″W

Green Bay in Nova Scotia

Green Bay is a community in the Canadian province of Nova Scotia, located in the Lunenburg Municipal District in Lunenburg County.

== Climate ==
According to the Köppen climate classification, Green Bay is a humid continental climate typified by large seasonal temperature differences, with warm to hot (and often humid) summers, and cold (sometimes severely) winters.

== Parks ==
- Bush Island Provincial Park
- Rissers Beach Provincial Park
- Crescent Beach Public/ Private beach
- Green Bay Private beaches that are open to the public.
