= Green Cove Springs, Florida =

- City
- City of Green Cove Springs
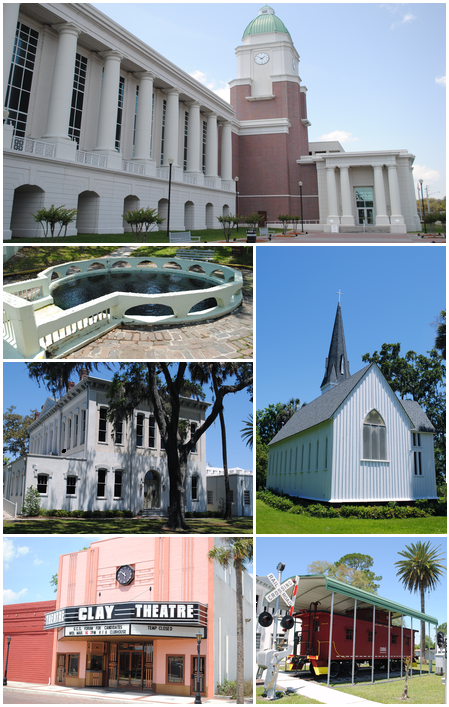
- Images from top, left to right: Clay County Courthouse, the springs, Clay County Courthouse, St. Mary's Episcopal Church, Clay Theatre, Clay County Historical Museum

- Flag Seal

- Location in Clay County and the state of Florida
- Coordinates: 29°59′44″N 81°41′28″W
- Country: United States
- State: Florida
- County: Clay
- Settled: 1816
- Incorporated: November 2, 1874

Government
  - Type: Council-manager

Area
  - Total: 10.27 sq mi (26.59 km^{2})
  - Land: 7.53 sq mi (19.50 km^{2})
  - Water: 2.74 sq mi (7.09 km^{2})
- Elevation: 16 ft (4.9 m)

Population (2020)
  - Total: 9,786
  - Density: 1,345.5/sq mi (519.49/km^{2})
- Time zone: UTC-5 (Eastern (EST))
  - Summer (DST): UTC-4 (EDT)
- ZIP code: 32043
- Area codes: 904, 324
- FIPS code: 12-27400
- GNIS feature ID: 2403735
- Website: www.greencovesprings.com

Green Cove Springs is a city in and the county seat of Clay County, Florida, United States. Green Cove Springs is a part of the Jacksonville, Florida Metropolitan Statistical Area. The population was 9,786 at the 2020 census, up from 6,908 at the 2010 census.

The city is named after a hydrological spring adjacent to the St. Johns River. The river course curves here, and the area is sheltered by trees that are perennially green.

== History ==
The area was first inhabited over 7,000 years ago by Native Americans attracted to a warm mineral spring. The hydrological spring, locally known as the "Original Fountain of Youth", attracted patrons in the 19th century to the spa town, where more than a dozen hotels were built near the spring to accommodate them. Today, the sulfur-scented spring water feeds an adjacent public swimming pool before flowing the short distance to the St. Johns River. The Green Cove Springs area was first developed by George J. F. Clarke in 1816 when he was provided land, under a Spanish land grant, to build a sawmill. Green Cove Springs was established in 1854 as White Sulfur Springs. Renamed in 1866, it became the Clay County seat in 1871.

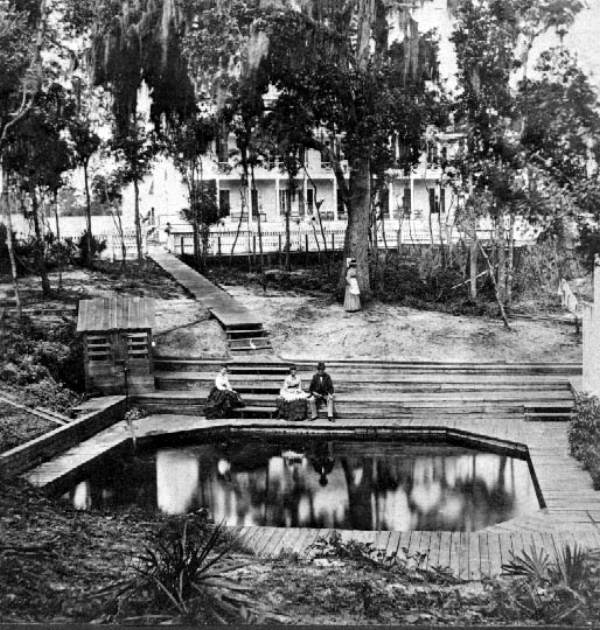
The spring (1870s)

Agriculture and tourism were the two primary economic activities in the area until the end of the 19th century, when Henry Flagler's railroad began taking tourists further south in Florida. In 1895, the Great Freeze destroyed the area's citrus crops, and tourism all but ended. The 1920s had renewed development, with automobile traffic once again bringing in tourists. The Great Depression of the 1930s marked the end of this period of growth for the city.

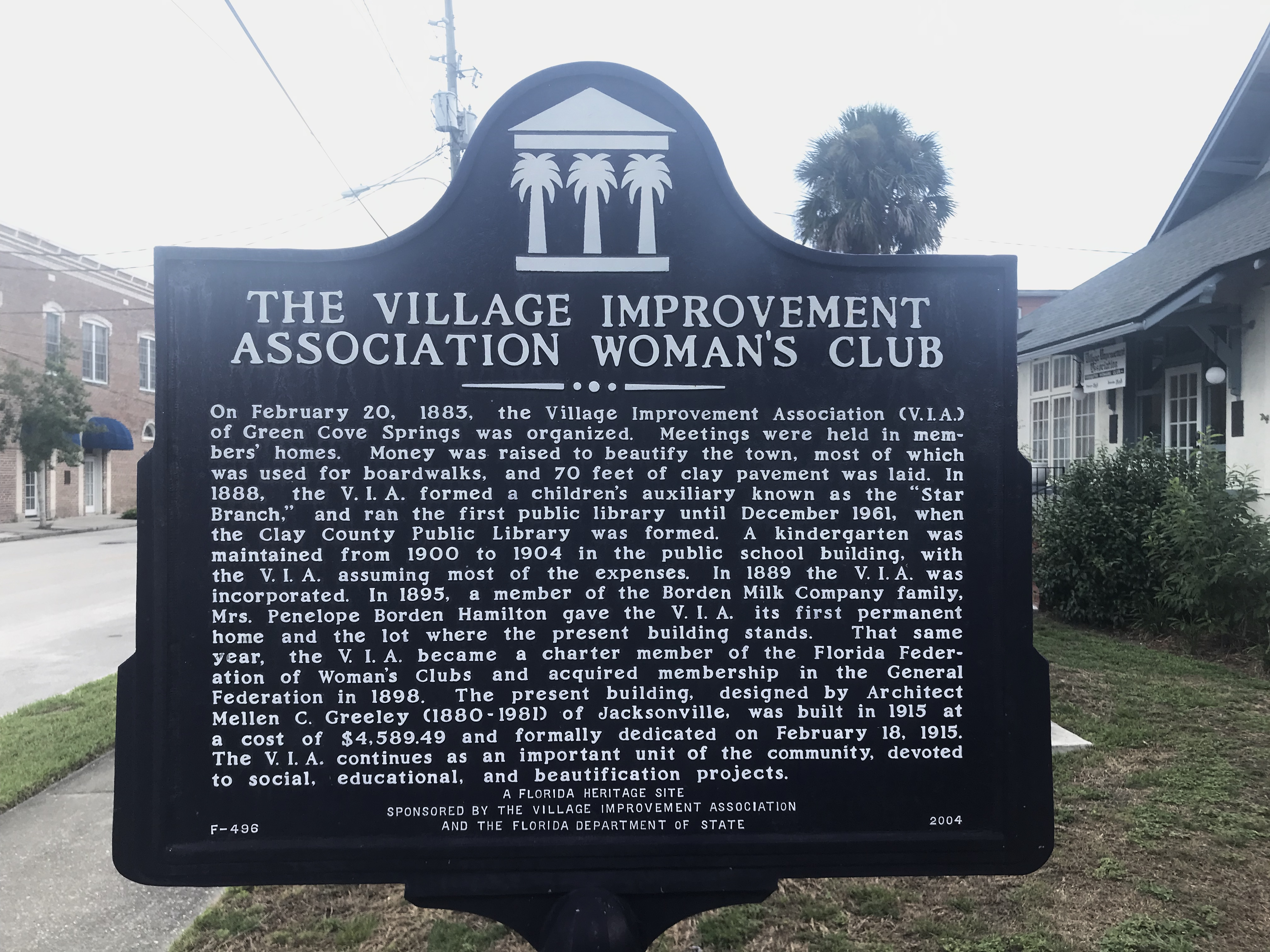
Green Cove Springs Village Improvement Association marker

The first women's club in the state of Florida was established in Green Cove Springs in 1883. The Village Improvement Association led local efforts to beautify the town, and established its first public library.

The period immediately before and during World War II again brought new growth to Green Cove Springs. On September 11, 1940, the U.S. Navy opened Naval Air Station Lee Field in honor of Ensign Bejamin Lee, who had lost his life in a crash at Killinghome, England, during World War I. In August 1943, the facility was renamed Naval Air Station Green Cove Springs and consisted of four 5,000-foot (1,500 m) asphalt runways. One of the Marine Corps aviators training in the F4U Corsair Operational Training Unit at Lee Field in early 1945 was eventual television personality Ed McMahon. After the war, NAS Green Cove Springs was downgraded in status to a Naval Auxiliary Air Station (NAAS) as part of the greater NAS Jacksonville complex. Thirteen piers were constructed along the west bank of the St. Johns River adjacent to NAAS Green Cove Springs to house a U.S. Navy Atlantic Reserve Fleet, Florida "mothball fleet" of some 500 vessels, primarily destroyers, destroyer escorts, and fleet auxiliaries. In 1960, the Navy decommissioned NAAS Green Cove Springs and the pier facility. Some of the mothballed vessels were transferred to foreign navies, while others were relocated to other Reserve Fleet locations.

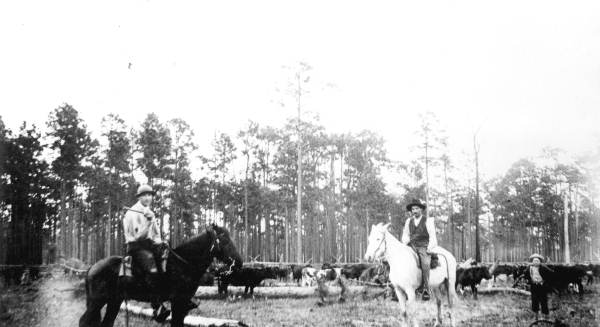
Cowboys with cattle in Green Cove Springs (1880s)

In 1984, the city annexed the former naval base into the city to use it for further growth and development as the Clay County Port and Reynolds Industrial Park. The air station is now a private airfield known as Reynolds Airpark (FAA airfield identifier FL60) with a single 5,000-foot (1,500 m) asphalt runway currently operational, although reportedly in poor condition. Though the original air traffic control tower is still standing, attached to one of the former Navy aircraft hangars, the airfield remains an uncontrolled facility.

Green Cove Springs is the birthplace of Charles E. Merrill (1885–1956), one of the founders of Merrill Lynch. The town's spring is described by his son James Merrill in the poem "Two From Florida", published in The Inner Room (1988).

Green Cove Springs is also the birthplace of Augusta Savage (née Augusta Christine Fells, February 29, 1892 – March 26, 1962). Savage was an African-American sculptor associated with the Harlem Renaissance.

Locally, the community is known as the home of Gustafson's Farm, a brand name of milk and dairy products sold throughout Florida. The main Gustafson Dairy Farm is located in Green Cove Springs and is one of the largest privately owned dairy farms in the Southeastern United States. Started in 1908, the main farm occupies nearly 10,000 acres (40 km^{2}) adjacent to the city limits. Gustafson's has many bottling plants across the state, stretching from Tallahassee in the west to Tampa and Cocoa in the south. All Gustafson products have the picture of the husband-and-wife founders, Frank and Agnes Gustafson (also known as Mama and Papa Gus), who along with their first cow on their farm (named "Buttercup") are prominently featured on the packaging of the dairy's products.

Scenes for the 1971 "B" monster movie Blood Waters of Dr. Z (or Zaat) were filmed here. The movie was satirized on the television program Mystery Science Theater 3000.

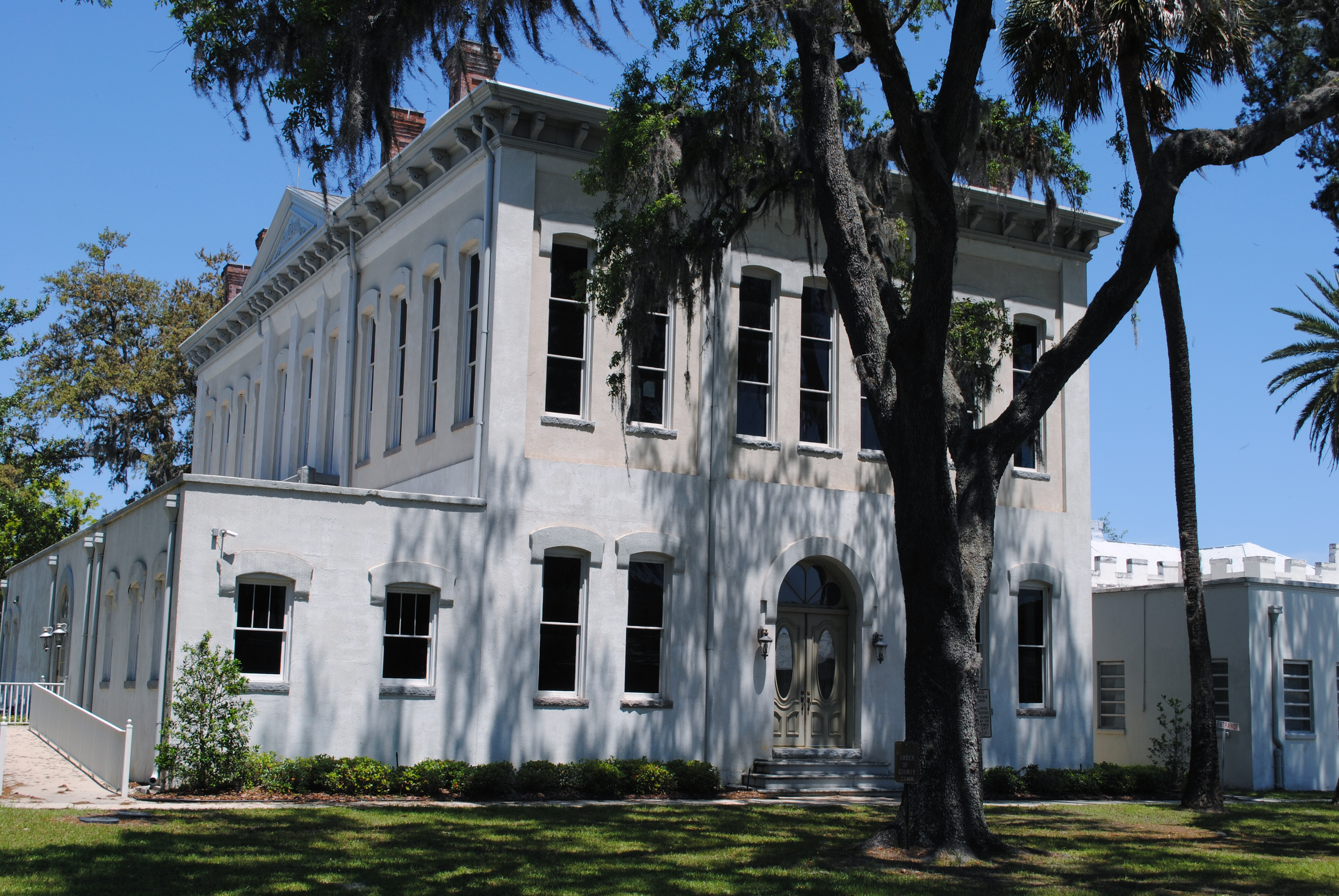
The Old Clay County Courthouse

=== Historic places ===
These sites are listed on the National Register of Historic Places:

- Clay County Courthouse
- Green Cove Springs Historic District
- St. Mary's Church
- "The Hellhouse" original rehearsal studio to Lynyrd Skynyrd

== Government ==
The city of Green Cove Springs is structured in a city council/city manager form of government, with the council functioning as the governing body. The city has had this form of government since the 1980 charter revision. The city council is composed of five members who are elected at large to three-year terms. The five-member council consists of the mayor, the vice mayor, and three council members. The mayor and vice mayor are elected by the council and serve in these positions for one year. As the official representative of the city, the mayor is responsible for all intergovernmental relations and for presiding over all meetings of the council. The vice mayor serves as the presiding officer for all council meetings in the mayor's absence. The current city manager is Steve Kennedy.

The current office holders are:

- Mayor Seat 3 – Connie Butler
- Vice Mayor Seat 5 – Steven Kelley
- City Council Seat 1 – Edward Gaw
- City Council Seat 2 – Matt Johnson
- City Council Seat 4 – Thomas Smith

The Green Cove Springs Police Department provides full law enforcement services within the incorporated city limits of Green Cove Springs. The agency is headed by a chief of police with two lieutenants acting as division commanders. The department currently consists of 29 sworn officers, part-time and full-time dispatchers, an evidence custodian, an administrative secretary, and two crossing guards. The agency has full-time officers assigned to the countywide Drug Task Force and Jacksonville Metro DEA Task Force, and also participates in the Clay County SWAT team. In addition to these specialized assignments, the police department is active in the North East Florida Intelligence Unit, North East Florida Burglary Detectives Unit, Northeast Florida Investigative Support Center, the Violent Crime Regional Coordinating Team, Sex Assault Task Force, and Domestic Violence Task Force.

The department serves a diverse community and handled approximately 32,974 calls for service in 2011, with an average response time of two minutes for calls of an emergency nature. The department makes use of mobile data terminals in all of their patrol vehicles for reporting and obtaining information on the streets. All officers receive advanced training in law enforcement, as well as career development.

In 2011, the police department became the first law enforcement agency in northeast Florida to use red-light cameras. The agency is also known for programs such as North East Florida Camp Cadet and the Teen Summit.

In April 2014, the agency moved into a newly built police station and emergency operations center at 1001 Idlewild Avenue.

The city of Green Cove Springs contracts with the Clay County Fire-Rescue Department for fire and medical services.

=== Post office ===
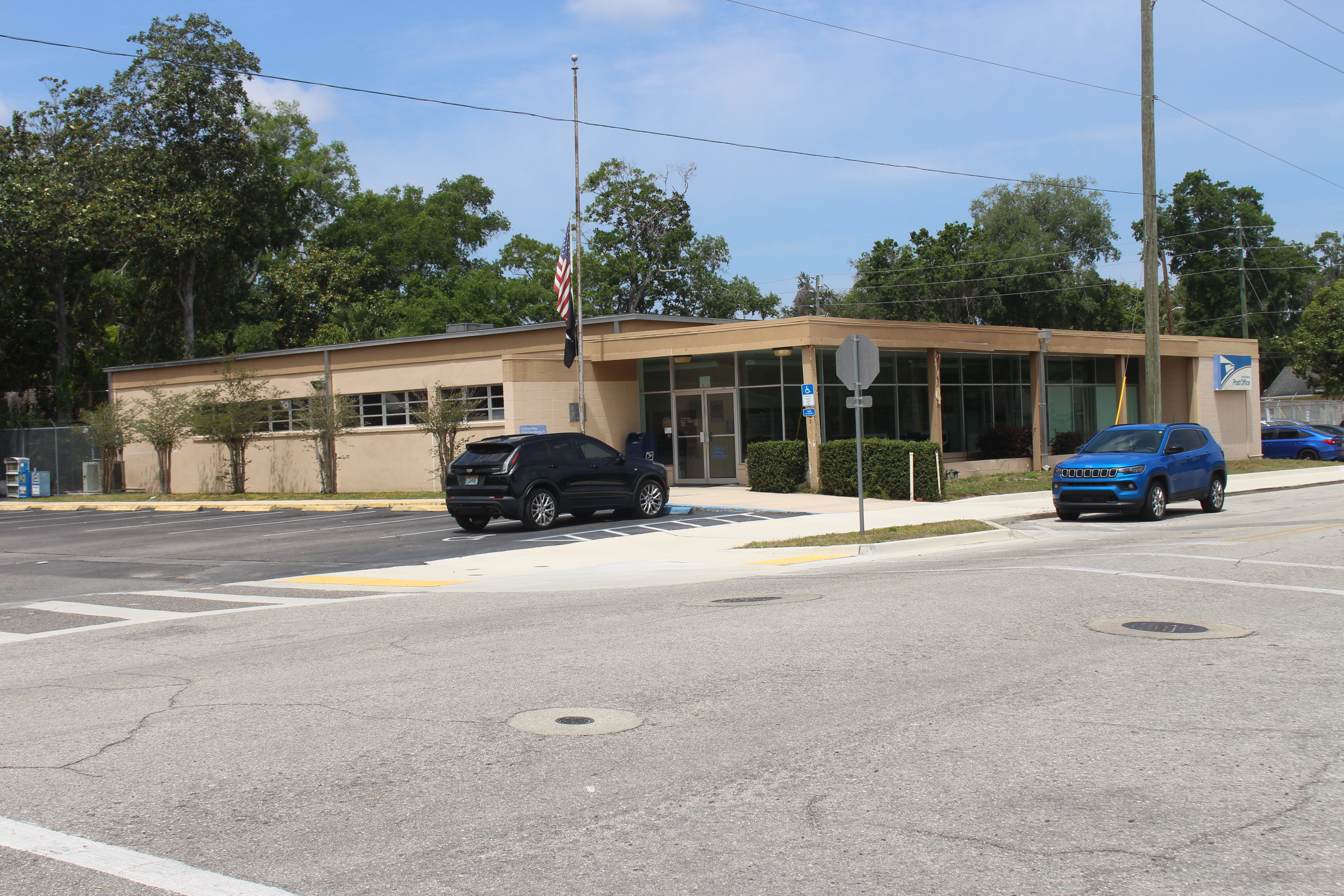
Post office

A U.S. post office was established at Hibernia on June 19, 1849, but its name was changed on October 17, 1853, to Magnolia Mills, and on July 30, 1866, it was changed to Green Cove Springs. The Hibernia post office was reestablished on February 16, 1855, and remained open until May 15, 1931, when it was closed and the area assigned to Green Cove Springs.

== Geography ==
Green Cove Springs is located on the eastern border of Clay County along the St. Johns River.

U.S. Route 17 passes through the center of town as Orange Avenue and leads north 28 miles (45 km) to downtown Jacksonville and south 26 miles (42 km) to Palatka. State Road 16 departs west from the center of the city and leads 27 miles (43 km) to Starke. SR 16 leaves eastbound from US 17 south of the city center and crosses the St. Johns River by the Shands Bridge, leading to St. Augustine 25 miles (40 km) to the east. By the late 2020s, the First Coast Expressway, a major toll bypass road connecting I-10 and I-95, is expected to pass to the west and south of Green Cove Springs.

According to the United States Census Bureau, the city has a total area of 9.9 square miles (25.6 km^{2}), of which 7.4 square miles (19.1 km^{2}) are land and 2.5 square miles (6.5 km^{2}), or 25.35%, are covered by water.

== Demographics ==
Historical population
Census	Pop.	Note	%±
1880	320		—
1890	1,106		245.6%
1900	929		−16.0%
1910	1,319		42.0%
1920	2,093		58.7%
1930	1,719		−17.9%
1940	1,752		1.9%
1950	3,291		87.8%
1960	4,233		28.6%
1970	3,857		−8.9%
1980	4,154		7.7%
1990	4,497		8.3%
2000	5,378		19.6%
2010	6,908		28.4%
2020	9,786		41.7%
2023 (est.)	10,130	▲	3.5%
U.S. Decennial Census

=== Racial and ethnic composition ===
Green Cove Springs city, Florida – Racial composition Note: the US Census treats Hispanic/Latino as an ethnic category. This table excludes Latinos from the racial categories and assigns them to a separate category. Hispanics/Latinos may be of any race.
Race (NH = Non-Hispanic)	2020	2010	2000	1990	1980
White alone (NH)	70.1% (6,862)	71.2% (4,920)	68.4% (3,681)	70.9% (3,190)	67.2% (2,791)
Black alone (NH)	13% (1,275)	18.7% (1,291)	24.2% (1,301)	26.4% (1,186)	31.2% (1,295)
American Indian alone (NH)	0.3% (26)	0.3% (19)	0.4% (20)	0.6% (26)	0% (0)
Asian alone (NH)	1.6% (153)	1% (66)	0.5% (29)	0.4% (16)	0.2% (8)
Pacific Islander alone (NH)	0.3% (25)	0.2% (12)	0% (1)		
Other race alone (NH)	0.4% (42)	0.1% (4)	0.1% (3)	0% (1)	0% (0)
Multiracial (NH)	4.4% (427)	1.6% (113)	1.3% (70)	—	—
Hispanic/Latino (any race)	10% (976)	7% (483)	5.1% (273)	1.7% (78)	1.4% (60)

=== 2020 census ===
As of the 2020 census, Green Cove Springs had a population of 9,786. The median age was 42.3 years. 21.4% of residents were under the age of 18 and 21.9% of residents were 65 years of age or older. For every 100 females there were 99.3 males, and for every 100 females age 18 and over there were 98.2 males age 18 and over.

99.9% of residents lived in urban areas, while 0.1% lived in rural areas.

There were 3,622 households in Green Cove Springs, of which 31.8% had children under the age of 18 living in them. Of all households, 54.8% were married-couple households, 14.6% were households with a male householder and no spouse or partner present, and 23.6% were households with a female householder and no spouse or partner present. About 20.2% of all households were made up of individuals and 9.9% had someone living alone who was 65 years of age or older.

There were 3,926 housing units, of which 7.7% were vacant. The homeowner vacancy rate was 2.5% and the rental vacancy rate was 5.3%.

=== Demographic estimates ===
The 2020 ACS 5-year estimates reported 2,046 families in the city.

=== 2010 census ===
As of the 2010 United States census, there were 6,908 people, 2,379 households, and 1,737 families residing in the city.

=== 2000 census ===
As of the census of 2000, there are 5,378 people, 1,987 households, and 1,402 families residing in the city. The population density was 789.0 inhabitants per square mile (304.6/km^{2}). The 2,199 housing units averaged 322.6 units per square mile (124.6 units/km^{2}). The racial makeup of the city is 71.55% White, 24.40% African American, 0.41% Native American, 0.54% Asian, 0.04% Pacific Islander, 1.34% from other races, and 1.73% from two or more races. 5.08% of the population are Hispanic or Latino of any race.

Of the 1,987 households in 2000, 28.9% had children under the age of 18 living with them, 50.2% were married couples living together, 16.2% had a female householder with no husband present, and 29.4% were not families. About 24.8% of all households were made up of individuals, and 12.3% had someone living alone who was 65 years of age or older. The average household size was 2.51, and the average family size was 2.96.

In 2000, in the city, the population distribution was 23.7% under the age of 18, 8.1% from 18 to 24, 26.0% from 25 to 44, 25.0% from 45 to 64, and 17.2% who were 65 years of age or older. The median age was 40 years. For every 100 females, there were 98.8 males. For every 100 females age 18 and over, there were 98.3 males.

In 2000, the median income for a household in the city was $33,487, and for a family was $40,443. Males had a median income of $28,097 versus $22,040 for females. The per capita income for the city was $17,673. About 14.6% of families and 19.1% of the population were below the poverty line, including 30.2% of those under age 18 and 13.7% of those age 65 or over.

=== Religion ===
==== Catholic ====
Sacred Heart Catholic Church, part of the Diocese of St. Augustine, was founded as a mission back in 1874, and now serves the city.

==== Protestant ====
The oldest Protestant church in Green Cove Springs is Hickory Grove Baptist Church. Other Baptist churches include First Baptist, First African Missionary Baptist and Mount Pleasant Missionary Baptist.

St. Mary's is the main Episcopal Church in Green Cove Springs.

United Methodist Church and Mount Zion African Methodist are the two Methodist churches.

The CCUS has a Congregationalist church in both Green Cove and Penney Farms.

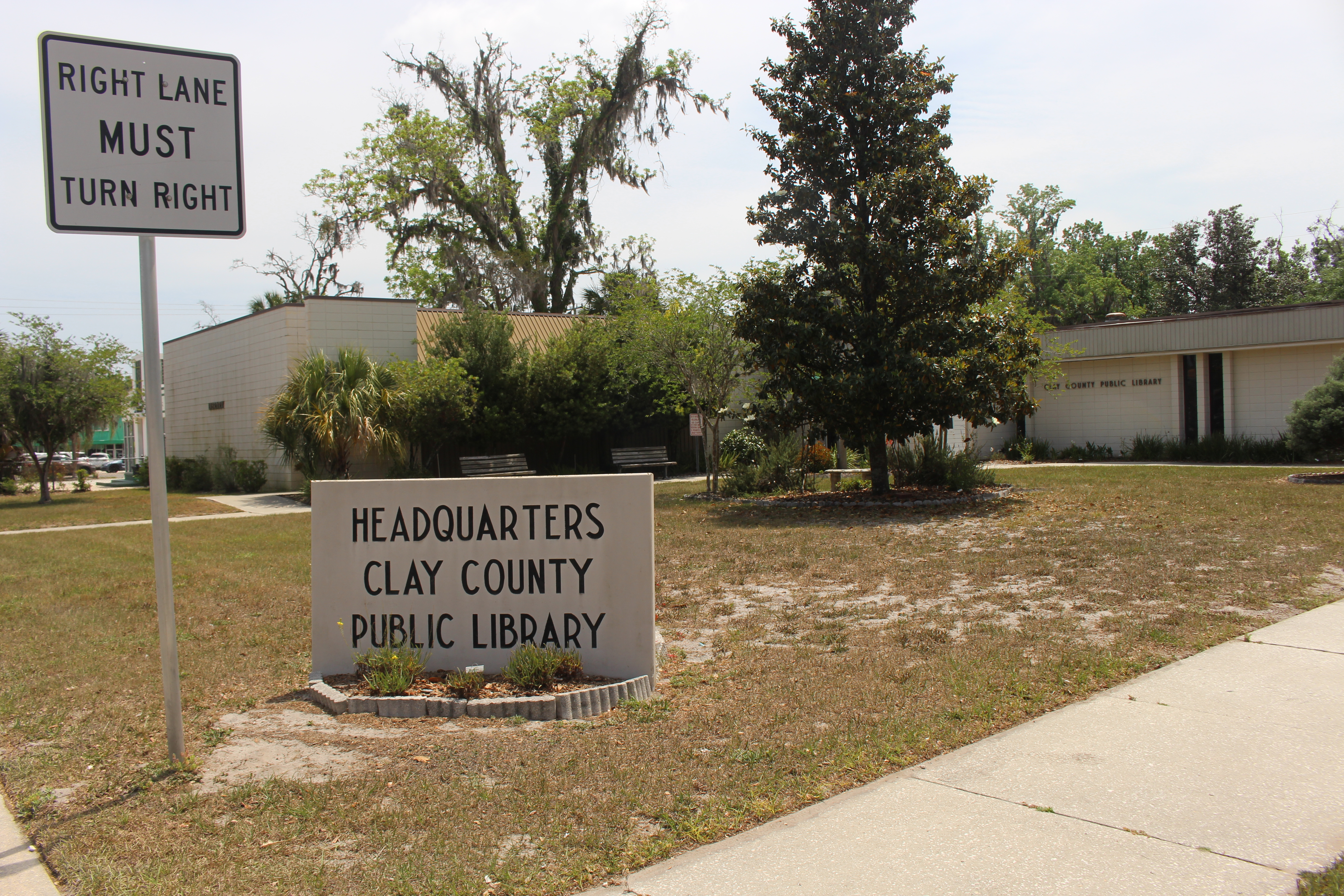
Clay County Public Library headquarters

== Education ==
Green Cove Springs is part of the Clay County School District. The city is home to Charles E. Bennett Elementary School, Green Cove Springs Jr. High School, and the Bannerman Learning Center. Clay High School lies just feet outside of the western city limits.

Clay County Public Library has the Green Cove Springs Library.

== Notable people ==
- Cliff Avril (born 1986), player in the National Football League
- Charles Thomas Butler (1906–1964), Major League Baseball pitcher
- Frank J. Canova Jr. (born 1956), electronics engineer, known for inventing the smartphone
- Caeleb Dressel (born 1996), swimmer and seven-time Olympic gold medalist
- Will Holden (born 1993), player in the National Football League
- Charles E. Merrill (1885–1956), American businessman and philanthropist
- Maxey Dell Moody Jr. (1913–1987), founder of MOBRO Marine, Inc.
- Augusta Fells Savage (1892–1962), sculptor and art educator, leader during the Harlem Renaissance of the 1920s

== Museums ==
- Clay County Historical Society Museum
- Military Museum of North Florida

== Transportation ==
=== Roadways ===
- SR 16 East – Leonard C. Taylor Parkway
- SR 16 West – Idlewild Avenue / Ferris Street
- US 17 – (North/South) Orange Avenue

The city center lies at the crossroads of US 17 and Florida 16. Just outside the city on Florida 16 East is Shands Bridge, a long and narrow two-lane bridge across the St. Johns River connecting the city and the rest of Clay County to St. Johns County.

=== JTA Clay Community transportation ===
The main transit system for Green Cove Springs is serviced by Clay Community Transportation (CCT), a regional service under the Jacksonville Transit Authority (JTA). CCT services two lines that run through Green Cove Springs:

- Clay Blue Line – connecting Green Cove Springs to Penney Farms, Fleming Island, Lakeside, Orange Park and Naval Air Station Jacksonville
- Clay Green Line – connecting Green Cove Springs to Doctor's Inlet, Fleming Island, Penney Farms and Keystone Heights.

=== Rail ===
While not a stop for any rail services, a rail line runs right through the middle of the city.

=== Airports ===
Green Cove Springs has two airports:

- Reynold Airpark (formerly Naval Auxiliary Air Station Lee Field) – a discontinued and condemned naval air strip now privately owned.
- Haller Airpark – a small private airstrip actively used for local and personal aviation.
