= Middleburg High School =

American public high school

Coordinates: 30.0887761°N 81.8505477°W

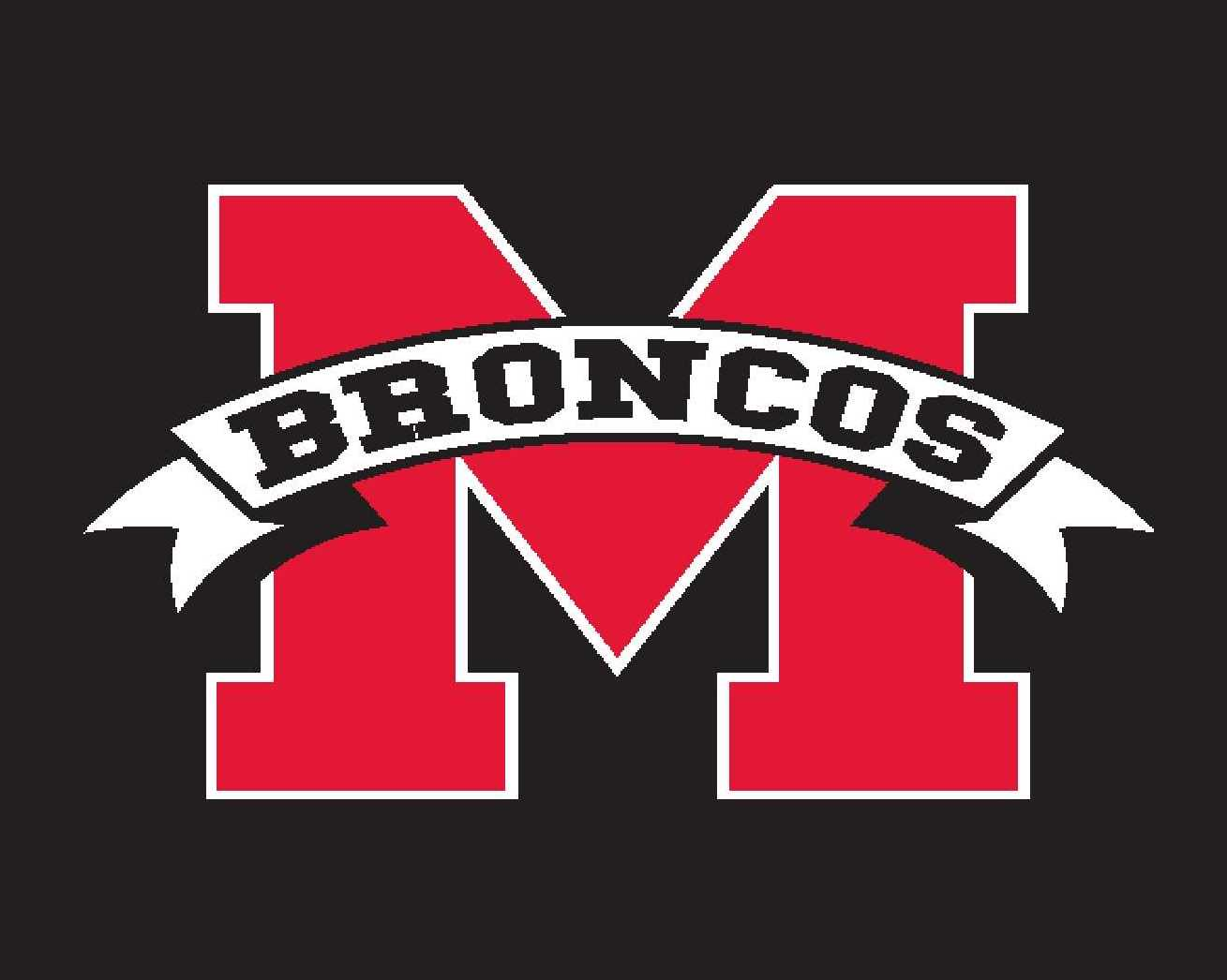

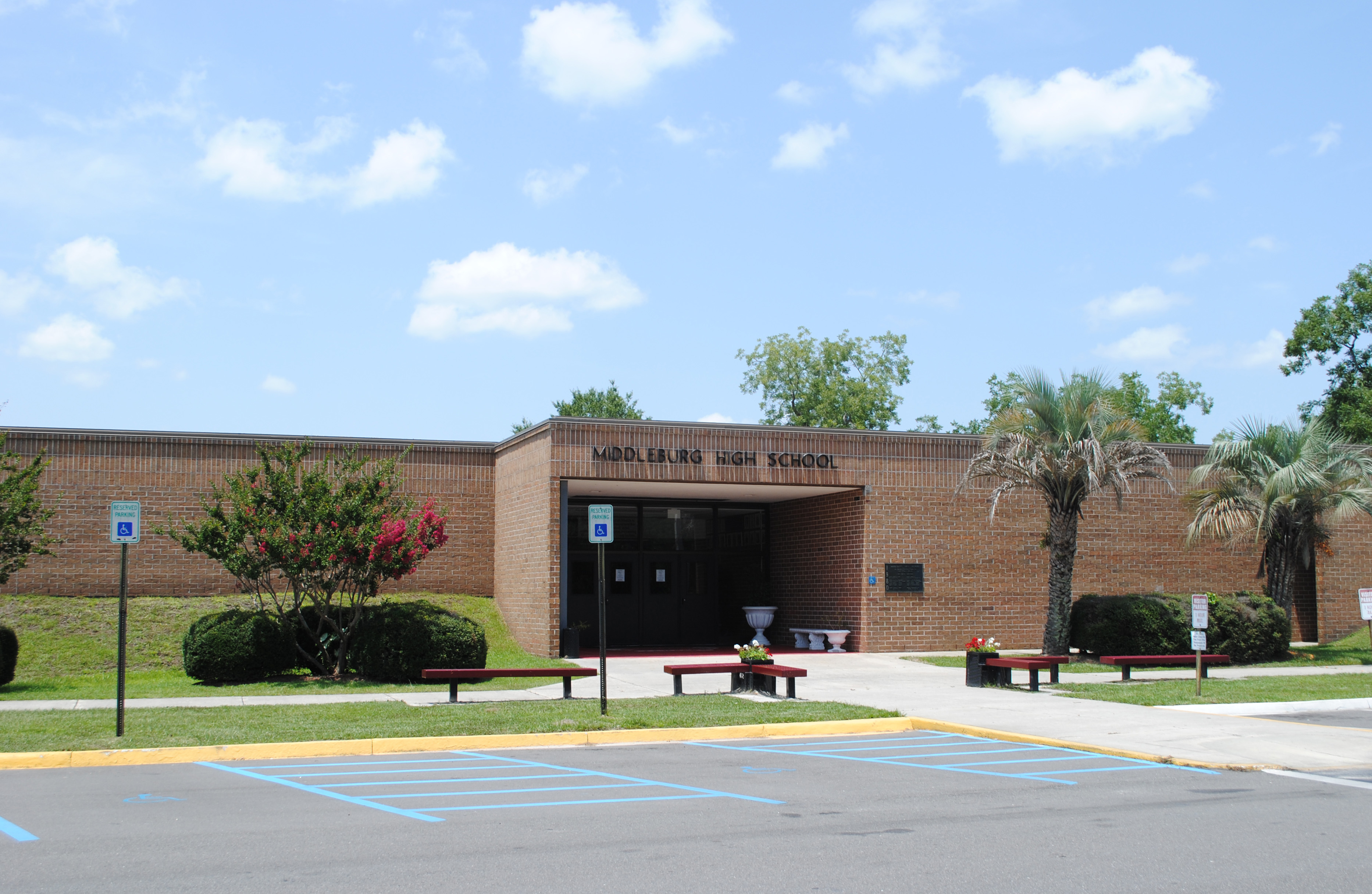

Location
- 3750 County Road 220; Middleburg, Florida 32068; United States

Information
- Type: Public
- Established: 1980
- School district: Clay County School District
- Principal: Martin Aftuck
- Faculty: 98.60 (on an FTE basis)
- Enrollment: 1,852 (2022–23)
- Student to teacher ratio: 18.78
- Campus type: Rural
- Colors: Red and White
- Mascot: Bronco
- Rivals: Ridgeview High School, Fleming Island High School, Orange Park High School and Oakleaf High School
- USNWR ranking: 3,847
- Website: https://www.oneclay.net/o/mhs

Middleburg High School is a high school located in Middleburg, Florida. It is a part of the Clay County School District.

The athletic teams are known as the Broncos. During the 2010–2011 year there were 1,783 students. MHS lost almost 300 students following the 2009–2010 school year due to the new Oakleaf High School being built.

== Academics ==
Middleburg High earned a 'B' from the Florida Department of Education for both the 2011–2012 and 2012–2013 school years. The school also hosts several Advanced Placement courses, of which participation from students has been on the rise for several years resulting in a higher number of students graduation to 4 year universities than in previous classes. Middleburg is also home to one of the only health block classes in Clay County, and hosts several vocational academies, including the Academy of Agriscience and Automotive, the Academy of Architecture, Construction, NJROTC Brain Brawl/Academics Team, Interior Design, and the newly established Academy of Information Technology and the SJRSC Collegiate High Program.

== Athletics ==
Middleburg High School has a diverse athletic scene with large participation from students in Cheerleading, Golf, Tennis, Basketball, Soccer, Track, Cross Country, Dance, Swimming, Wrestling, Football, Baseball, Slow and Fast-Pitch Softball, Academic Team, Marching Band, Weight Lifting, and NJROTC Athletics Team.

The school's mascot, the Bronco, is the same one as that of the Denver Broncos, but with the image inverted and alternative colors. "Bronco Country" is often used to refer to the Middleburg athletic department and Middleburg in general.

== Extracurricular activities ==
Middleburg High's extracurricular activities range widely from the traditional Health Occupations Students of America (HOSA), National Honor Society, and chorus to less conventional clubs such as anime. Student participation in FFA and NJROTC is particularly high.

Middleburg High features the ‘Bronco Book Club’ as a way to encourage reading amongst its students and executive boards for each class (i.e. Seniors, Juniors, Sophomores, and Freshmen). Middleburg also has a Health Students of America chapter which attends state competition yearly. The school also has an active SkillsUSA chapter, in which students compete on the regional, state, and national level in trade-related events.

== Notable alumni ==
- Lenny Curry (Class of 1987) - American politician, accountant, and businessman who served as the 67th mayor of Jacksonville, Florida from 2015 to 2023
- Mike Bynum (Class of 1996) – former professional baseball player (San Diego Padres)
- Richard Owens (Class of 1999) – former tight end for the Minnesota Vikings, New York Jets and St. Louis Rams
- Gary Barnidge (Class of 2004) – former tight end for the Carolina Panthers and Cleveland Browns.
- Pat Tomberlin (Class of 1984) - former tackle for Florida State, Indianapolis Colts and Tampa Bay Buccaneers
