= Keystone High School =

Keystone High School may refer to:

- Keystone Charter School — Sandy Valley, Nevada
- Keystone High School (LaGrange, Ohio)
- Keystone Oaks High School — Pittsburgh, Pennsylvania
- Keystone Job Corp High School — Drums, Pennsylvania
- Keystone Junior/Senior High School — Knox, Pennsylvania
- Keystone Heights Junior-Senior High School — Keystone Heights, Florida
- Keystone National High School a correspondence school — Pennsylvania
- Keystone School — San Antonio, Texas
