= Ian Silberman =

American football player (born 1992)

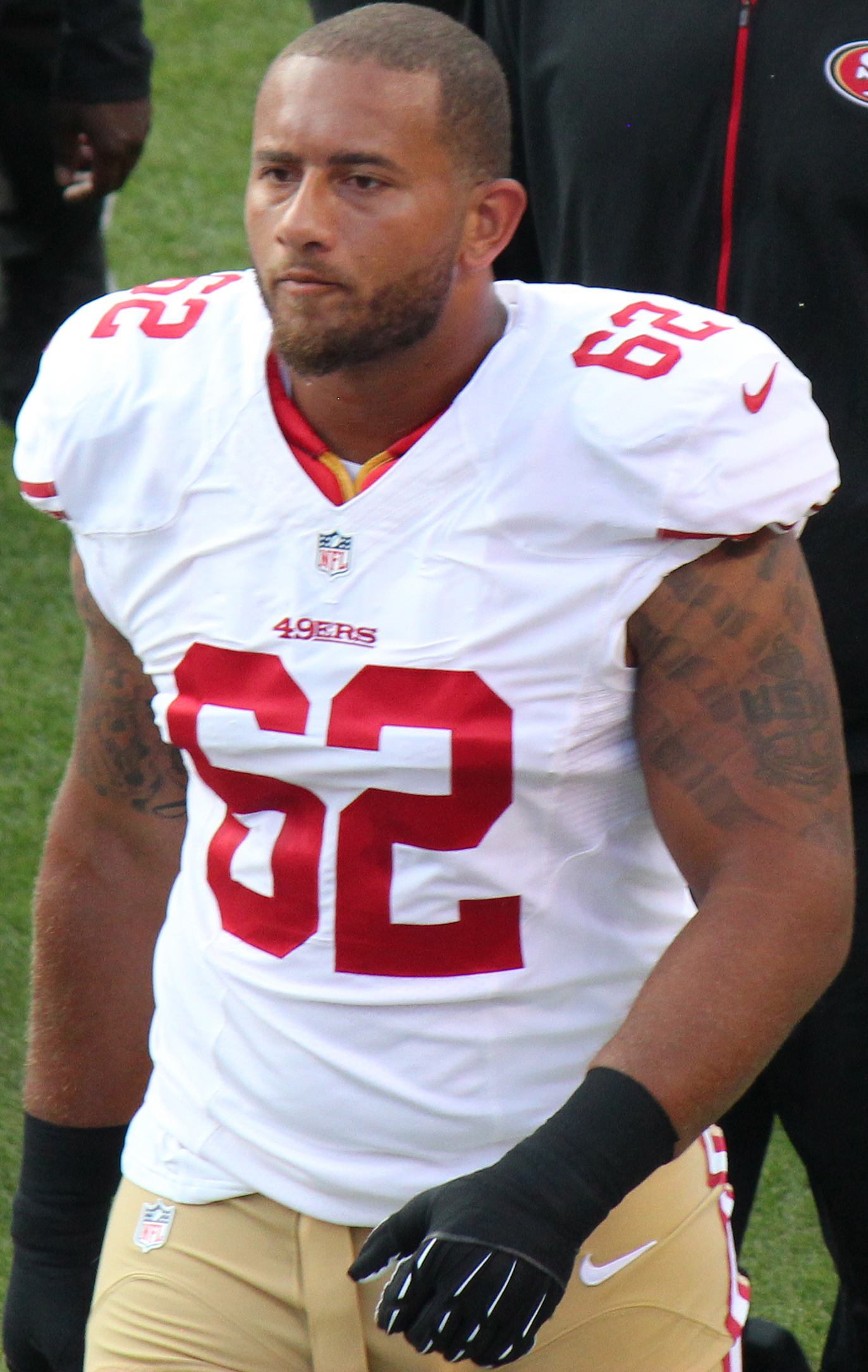
- Silberman with the San Francisco 49ers in 2015

No. 62, 67, 69
- Position: Guard

Personal information
- Born: October 10, 1992 (age 34); Orange Park, Florida, U.S.
- Listed height: 6 ft 5 in (1.96 m)
- Listed weight: 305 lb (138 kg)

Career information
- High school: Fleming Island (Fleming Island, Florida)
- College: Boston College
- NFL draft: 2015: 6th round, 190th overall pick

Career history
- San Francisco 49ers (2015); New England Patriots (2016)*; Oakland Raiders (2016–2017)*; Indianapolis Colts (2017); Cleveland Browns (2017)*; Oakland Raiders (2017); Tennessee Titans (2018)*; Oakland Raiders (2018); Carolina Panthers (2018–2019)*; Indianapolis Colts (2019)*; Arizona Cardinals (2019)*; New York Guardians (2020)
- * Offseason or practice squad member only

Awards and highlights
- Third-team All-ACC (2014)

Career NFL statistics
- Games played: 3
- Stats at Pro Football Reference

Ian Silberman (born October 10, 1992) is an American former professional football player who was a guard in the National Football League (NFL). A 2009 USA Today High School All-American out of Fleming Island High School, Silberman played college football for the Florida Gators, appearing in 20 games with seven starts, before transferring to the Boston College Eagles after his graduation. Silberman was selected by the San Francisco 49ers in the sixth round of the 2015 NFL draft. He was also a member of the New England Patriots, Indianapolis Colts, Cleveland Browns, Oakland Raiders, Carolina Panthers, and New York Guardians.

== Early life ==
A native of Orange Park, Florida, Silberman attended Fleming Island High School, where he played offensive tackle and also saw limited action at defensive end. As a junior, Silberman earned All-Area and All-Clay County honors and was named to the 4A All-State Second-team. The Golden Eagles finished 8–2 on the season, yet missed the playoffs because of lopsided district losses to Orange Park and Gainesville Buchholz late in the season. In his senior year, Silberman helped to lead Fleming Island to a 10–2 season record. The Golden Eagles advanced to the FHSAA Class 5A Regional finals, where they lost to Lakeland High School. Silberman was named Second-team USA Today High School All-American after the season, and also participated in the 2010 Under Armour All-American Game at Tropicana Field in St. Petersburg.

Regarded as a four-star recruit by Rivals.com, Silberman was ranked as the No. 10 offensive tackle prospect of the class of 2010, which was highlighted by Seantrel Henderson. He chose Florida over offers from Auburn, Louisiana State, and Southern California.

== College career ==
After redshirting his initial year at the University of Florida, Silberman saw limited action during his redshirt freshman season, appearing on the Gators' offensive line in only three non-conference games. In his sophomore year, Silberman played in eight games while starting three. As a junior, he started four games of out of a total of eight he appeared in.

Having graduated from Florida in December 2013 with a bachelor's degree in Family, Youth and Community Science, Silberman decided to use his final year of eligibility at another institution. He was set to transfer to Louisville, but reversed his decision after head coach Charlie Strong left for the Texas Longhorns. Instead, he and quarterback Tyler Murphy decided to enroll at Boston College. Silberman started all 13 games at right tackle for the Eagles, competing in 896 plays (98.1 percent of the team's offensive snaps), as dual-threat quarterback Murphy broke the ACC single-season record for rushing yards by a quarterback (1,184). After the season, Silberman earned All-ACC third-team honors voted by the league’s head coaches.

== Professional career ==
=== San Francisco 49ers ===
Silberman was selected by the San Francisco 49ers in the sixth round (190th overall) in the 2015 NFL draft. On August 27, 2016, Silberman was released by the 49ers.

=== New England Patriots ===
On September 15, 2016, Silberman was signed to the Patriots' practice squad. He was released on September 28, 2016. He was re-signed to the practice squad on October 11, 2016. He was released on October 18, 2016.

=== Oakland Raiders (first stint) ===
On October 21, Silberman was signed to the Oakland Raiders' practice squad. He signed a reserve/future contract with the Raiders on January 9, 2017. He was waived on September 2, 2017.

=== Indianapolis Colts (first stint) ===
Silberman was claimed off waivers by the Indianapolis Colts on September 3, 2017. He was waived by the Colts on September 22, 2017 and was re-signed to the practice squad. He was released on November 21, 2017.

=== Cleveland Browns ===
On December 13, 2017, Silberman was signed to the Cleveland Browns' practice squad.

=== Oakland Raiders (second stint) ===
On December 22, 2017, Silberman was signed by the Raiders off the Browns' practice squad. He was waived on September 2, 2018.

=== Tennessee Titans ===
On September 25, 2018, Silberman was signed to the Tennessee Titans' practice squad.

=== Oakland Raiders (third stint) ===
On October 3, 2018, Silberman was signed by the Raiders off the Titans' practice squad. On December 3, he was released.

=== Carolina Panthers ===
On December 6, 2018, Silberman was signed to the Carolina Panthers practice squad. He signed a reserve/future contract with the Panthers on December 31, 2018. He was waived on July 24, 2019.

=== Indianapolis Colts (second stint) ===
On July 30, 2019, Silberman was signed by the Colts. He was released with a non-football illness designation on August 10, 2019.

=== Arizona Cardinals ===
On November 13, 2019, Silberman was signed to the Arizona Cardinals practice squad, but was released six days later.

=== New York Guardians ===
Silberman signed with the New York Guardians of the XFL in December 2019. He had his contract terminated when the league suspended operations on April 10, 2020.
