= Doctors Lake =

Doctors Lake may refer to:

- Doctors Lake (Nova Scotia)
- Doctors Lake (Florida)
