= Jimmy Brumbaugh =

American football player and coach (born 1976)

Personal information
- Born: December 9, 1976 (age 49); Gainesville, Florida, U.S.
- Listed height: 6 ft 1 in (1.85 m)
- Listed weight: 287 lb (130 kg)

Career information
- High school: Keystone Heights (Keystone Heights, Florida)
- College: Auburn
- NFL draft: 2000: undrafted

Career history

Playing
- San Francisco 49ers (2000)*; Birmingham Thunderbolts (2001); Georgia Force (2002); Birmingham Steeldogs (2003)
- * Offseason or practice squad member only

Coaching
- Jacksonville State (2004) Student assistant; Chattanooga (2005) Defensive line; LSU (2006–2007) Assistant strength and conditioning; Louisiana Tech (2008–2009) Defensive line; Syracuse (2010) Defensive line; Syracuse (2011) Defensive tackles; East Mississippi Community College (2012) Defensive line / Strength and conditioning; Kentucky (2013–2016) Defensive line; Maryland (2017–2018) Co-defensive coordinator / defensive line; Colorado (2019) defensive line; Tennessee (2020) Co-defensive coordinator / defensive line; Oregon (2021) Defensive analyst; Auburn (2022) Defensive line; Coastal Carolina (2023–2024) Defensive line

Awards and highlights
- National champion (2007); First-team All-SEC (1997); Second-team All-SEC (1996)

Career AFL statistics
- Total tackles: 2
- Stats at ArenaFan.com

Jimmy Brumbaugh (born December 9, 1976) is a former American and arena football defensive tackle / offensive lineman. He played college football at Auburn. He was originally signed as an undrafted free agent in 2000 by the San Francisco 49ers of the National Football League (NFL).

After not making the 49ers roster, Brumbaugh went on to play in the short-lived XFL for the Birmingham Thunderbolts, the Georgia Force of the Arena Football League (AFL) and Birmingham Steeldogs of af2. After which, he retired and became a coach.

== Early life ==
Brumbaugh attended Keystone Heights Junior/Senior High School, where he was a two-time Class 3A all-state lineman. He then attended Auburn University, where he majored in health and human performance. As a true freshman in 1995, he was named to the freshman All-Southeastern Conference (SEC) team. In 1996 as a sophomore, he recorded a career-high 80 tackles and was named Second-team All-SEC. As a junior in 1997, he recorded 78 total tackles. During the Tigers tenth game, against Georgia, he ruptured his patella on the first play of the game. Despite his injury, he was named First-team All-SEC. In 1998 he appeared in just three games. He recorded 11 tackles. Due to complications from the surgery, the National Collegiate Athletic Association (NCAA) granted him a medical hardship, allowing him to return for another year. As a redshirt senior, in 1999, he recorded 51 tackles, six sacks, three fumble recoveries and nine quarterback hits.

During his college career, he recorded 291 tackles, 22 tackles-for-loss and 15 sacks.

== Professional career ==
After going unselected in the 2000 NFL draft, Brumbaugh signed with the San Francisco 49ers. After he failed to make the 49ers roster, he spent 2001 playing for the Birmingham Thunderbolts of the XFL, where he recorded 22 tackles and one sack. After the XFL folded, he joined the Georgia Force of the Arena Football League (AFL) in 2002, where he recorded two tackles. He spent 2003 in af2 with the Birmingham Steeldogs.

== Coaching career ==
In 2004, Brumbaugh joined the Jacksonville State football coaching staff, a staff that helped the Gamecocks win the Ohio Valley Conference championship, as a student assistant. In 2005, he joined Tennessee-Chattanooga as the Mocs defensive line coach. He then spent two seasons at LSU as the assistant strength and conditioning. During his final season at LSU, the Tigers won the National championship. In 2008, he joined Louisiana Tech as the team's defensive line coach. After two seasons there, he spent 2010 at Syracuse coaching the defensive line. In 2011, he was named the Orange's defensive tackles coach. In December 2011, Brumbaugh along with Dan Conley were fired by Syracuse. In 2012, he was named the defensive line coach and strength and conditioning coordinator at East Mississippi Community College. The next year, he joined Kentucky as the Wildcats' defensive line coach.

== Personal life ==
He is married to his wife Kelly Brumbaugh (née Jones). They have two sons.
