= Ronald Jackson =

Ronald or Ron Jackson may refer to:

- Ron Jackson (1950s first baseman) (1933–2008), American MLB player
- Ron Jackson (baseball, born 1953), American MLB coach and former player
- Ron Jackson (jazz musician) (born 1964), American jazz guitarist
- Ron Jackson Jr. (born 1997), American PLK player
- Ron Jackson (footballer) (1919–1980), English professional footballer
- Ronald Shannon Jackson (1940–2013), American jazz drummer
- Ronald L. Jackson II (born 1970), American academic and author
- Ronald Jackson (bishop), American former Anglican bishop
- Ronny Jackson (born 1967), U.S. Congressman and former presidential physician
- Ronnie Jackson, real name of Lil' Ronnie (born 1983), American record producer, songwriter, and entrepreneur

== Fictional characters ==
- Ronald Jackson, in the 2013 action-adventure video game Dead Rising 3
- Ronnie Jackson, in the 1947 US romantic comedy film and film noir parody My Favorite Brunette, played by Bob Hope
