= Clay County School District (Florida) =

School district in Florida, United States

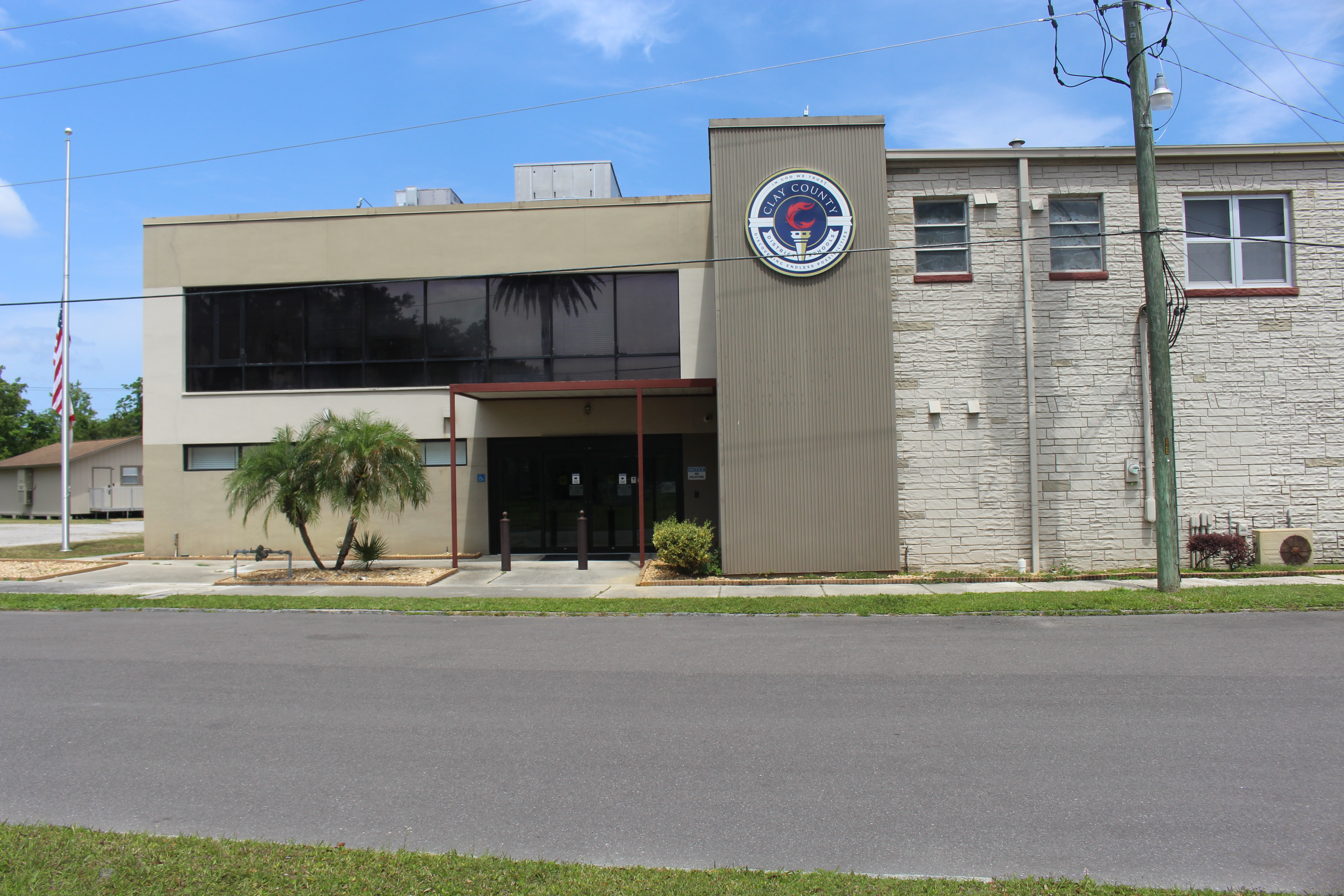
- Headquarters

Address
- 900 Walnut Street Green Cove Springs, Florida, 32043; United States

District information
- Type: Public
- Grades: PreK–12
- NCES District ID: 1200300

Students and staff
- Students: 38,268
- Teachers: 2,482.04
- Staff: 2,481.9
- Student–teacher ratio: 15.42

Other information
- Website: oneclay.net

Clay County School District is a school district serving Clay County, Florida, and headquartered in Green Cove Springs. The School District encompasses a 601 square-mile suburban/rural county in Northeast Florida, including the communities of Orange Park, Middleburg, Green Cove Springs, Fleming Island, Penney Farms, Clay Hill, Oakleaf, and Keystone Heights.

On February 26, 2019, the Clay County School Board voted to move forward with its decision to form a school district police department. Superintendent Addison Davis announced he had hired Lt. Kenneth Wagner, a 20-year veteran with the Clay County Sheriff's Office, as a director and proposed chief for the new department.

== Schools ==
David Broskie is the Superintendent of Schools for Clay County Public Schools in Florida. He was appointed Interim Superintendent in March 2020 and was elected to a full term as Superintendent in November 2020.

=== Elementary schools ===
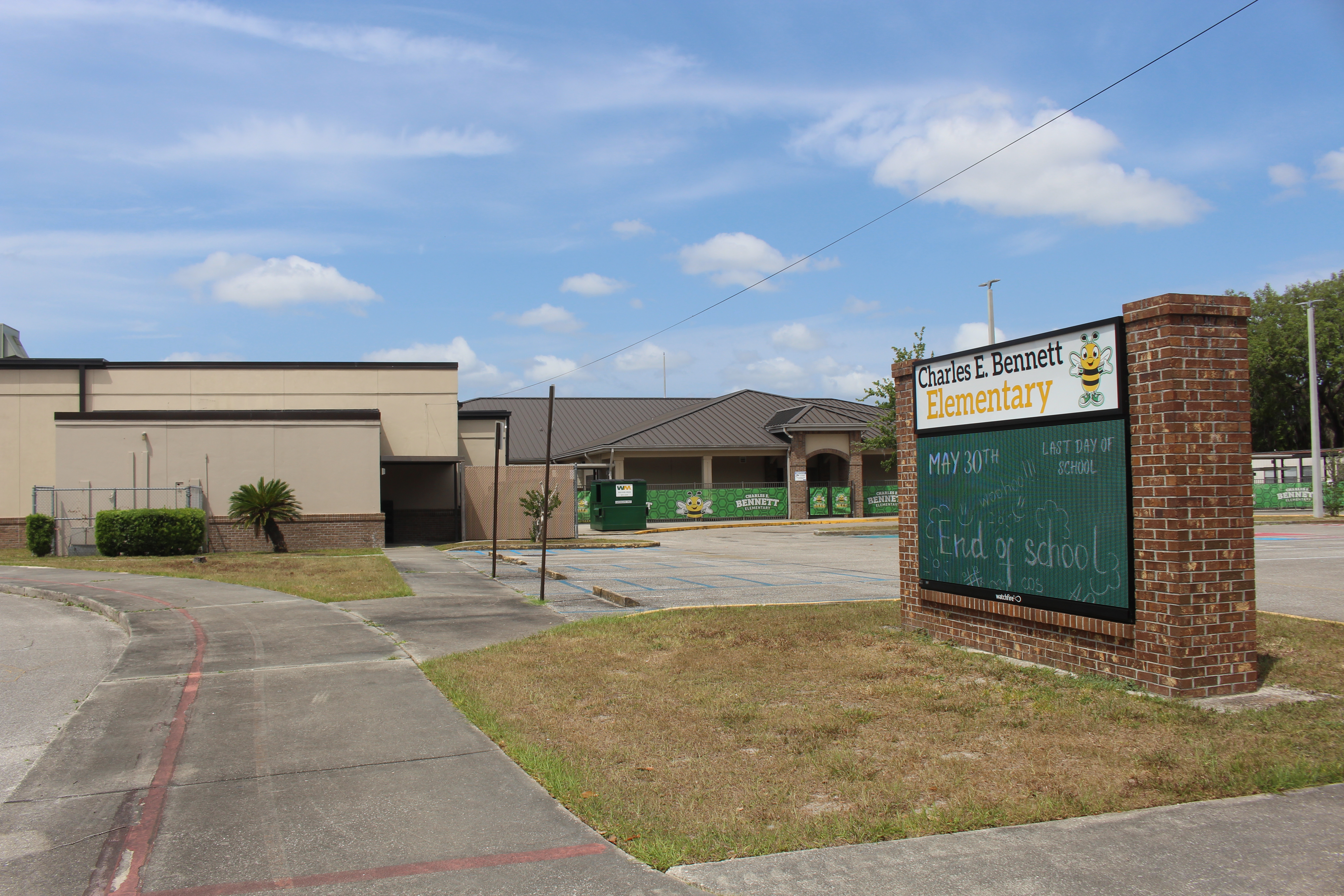
Charles E. Bennett Elementary School

- Argyle Elementary School
- Charles E. Bennett Elementary
- Clay Hill Elementary
- Coppergate Elementary
- Discovery Oaks Elementary
- Doctors Inlet Elementary
- Fleming Island Elementary
- Grove Park Elementary
- Keystone Heights Elementary
- Lake Asbury Elementary
- Lakeside Elementary
- McRae Elementary
- Middleburg Elementary
- Montclair Elementary
- Oakleaf Village Elementary
- Orange Park Elementary
- Paterson Elementary
- Plantation Oaks Elementary
- RideOut Elementary
- Ridgeview Elementary
- S. Bryan Jennings Elementary
- Shadowlawn Elementary
- Spring Park Elementary
- Swimming Pen Creek Elementary
- Thunderbolt Elementary
- Tynes Elementary
- W.E. Cherry Elementary
- Wilkinson Elementary

=== Middle schools ===
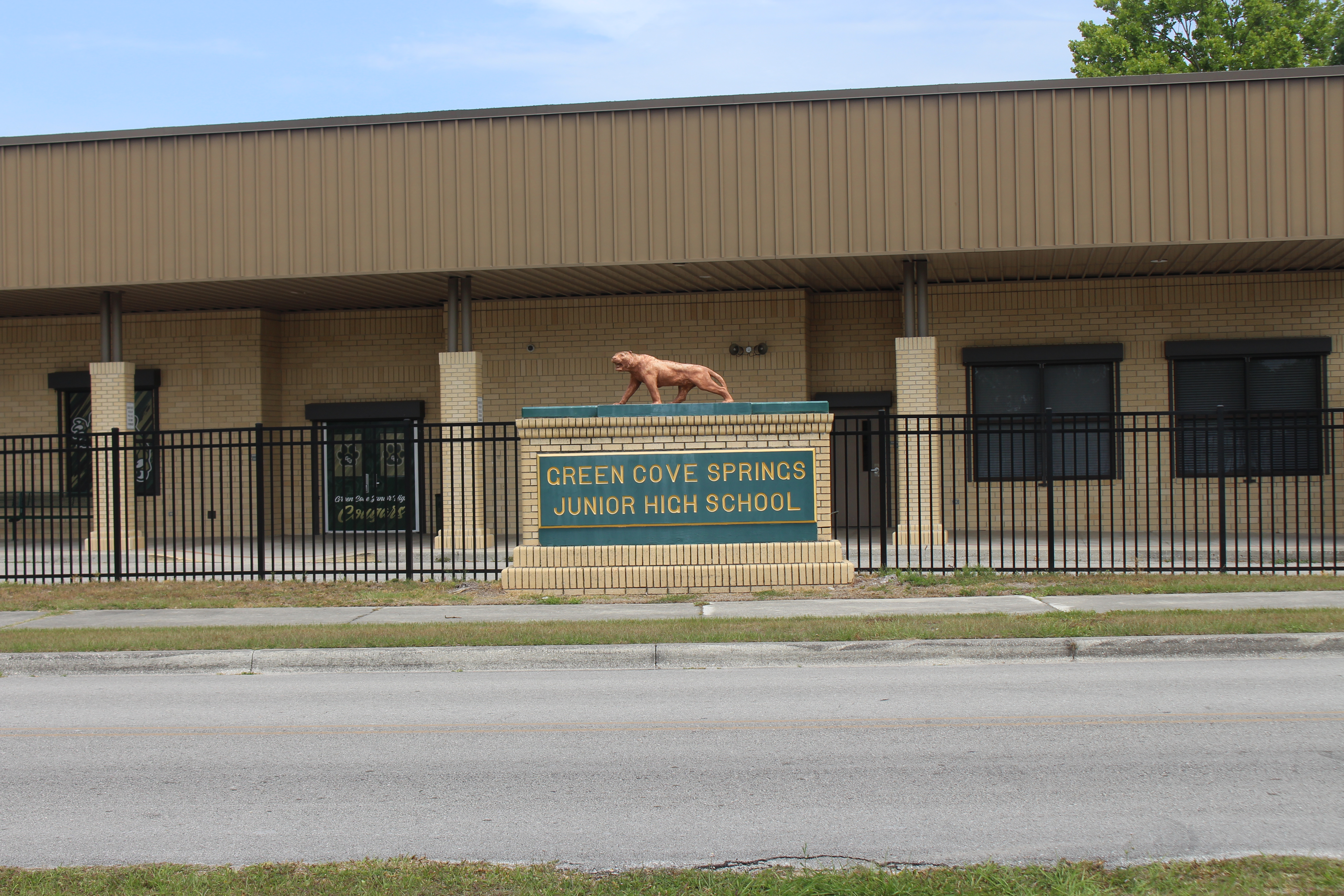
Green Cove Springs Junior High School

- Green Cove Springs Junior High
- Lake Asbury Junior High
- Lakeside Junior High
- Oakleaf Junior High
- Orange Park Junior High
- Wilkinson Junior High

=== Senior high schools ===
- Clay High School
- Bannerman Learning Center
- Orange Park High School
- Keystone Heights Junior/Senior High School
- Middleburg High School
- Ridgeview High School
- Fleming Island High School
- Oakleaf High School
