= Lakeside, Florida =

- Census-designated place
- Location in Clay County and the state of Florida
- Coordinates: 30°08′05″N 81°45′57″W
- Country: United States
- State: Florida
- County: Clay

Area
  - Total: 15.65 sq mi (40.53 km^{2})
  - Land: 13.45 sq mi (34.84 km^{2})
  - Water: 2.19 sq mi (5.68 km^{2})
- Elevation: 66 ft (20 m)

Population (2020)
  - Total: 31,275
  - Density: 2,325/sq mi (897.6/km^{2})
- Time zone: UTC-5 (Eastern (EST))
  - Summer (DST): UTC-4 (EDT)
- FIPS code: 12-38813
- GNIS feature ID: 2403211

Lakeside is an unincorporated area and census-designated place in Clay County, Florida, United States. It is part of the greater Orange Park area and is included in the Jacksonville, Florida Metropolitan Statistical Area. The population was 31,275 at the 2020 census, up from 30,943 at the 2010 census.

== Geography ==
Lakeside is located in northeastern Clay County. It is bordered on its northeastern edge by the Town of Orange Park. To the north is the Bellair-Meadowbrook Terrace CDP, and to the southeast, across Doctors Lake, an inlet of the St. Johns River, is Fleming Island. The community of Doctors Inlet is just to the south of Lakeside.

According to the United States Census Bureau, the CDP has a total area of 15.7 square miles (40.7 km^{2}), of which 13.5 square miles (35.0 km^{2}) is land and 2.2 square miles (5.7 km^{2}), or 13.96%, is water.

== History ==
The Yerkes Regional Primate Research Center, one of ten regional centers for primate research, was once located just west of Orange Park in what is now the Lakeside CDP. The center, established in 1930 by psychologist Robert Yerkes and Yale University and the Rockefeller Foundation, was the first laboratory in the United States for the study of non-human primates. Prior to the opening of the facility, Yerkes was engaged in his own research with two great apes, named "Chim" and "Panzee". His findings convinced officials at Yale University, the Rockefeller Foundation and the Carnegie Foundation to sponsor the Florida facility. Initially designed to house about 25 chimpanzees, researchers worked with an estimated 65 chimps (and possibly more) during the lab's 35-year history. This location was home to chimpanzees nurtured as humans such as Gua and Viki and other primates from the estate of Madame Rosalia Abreu in Havana, Cuba. It was home to some of the leading behavioral scientists of the time, some of whom either liked or hated living in the humid South. These researchers studied various aspects of primate behavior, including basic biology, sensory function, reproductive systems, behavioral patterns, physiology and anatomy. Comically, rumors about the place by some Orange Park residents included those of scientists cross-breeding humans with apes. The term "Monkey Farm" has been used by some residents, who may be aware of the location's history, to describe the lab's functions.

The plot of land upon which Yerkes Labs sat was 188 acres (76 ha), about a mile west of Orange Park. The actual research buildings sat on less than an acre, on what is now part of the Foxwood Center plaza (facing Orange Park Medical Center on Kingsley Avenue) in unincorporated land outside the town limits. In 1966, the abandoned buildings and adjacent land were purchased by Developer Marvin Wilhite of Ahpla, Inc., who still lives in Foxwood and built other communities such as Foxridge. He chose the name Ahpla (using a backward arrangement of the letters) after a female chimp named Alpha, who was the first chimp born at the Yerkes Labs on September 11, 1930.

Foxwood Center still has some of the original laboratory buildings that once housed the chimps, the grounds caretaker, and administrative offices. These stand alongside others that have been added, including the Orange Park Chamber of Commerce building. The old caretaker's house is now known as The Granary, an organic food and health store.

In 1956, Emory University took over operation of the Center. In 1965, the center was relocated to the campus of Emory University in Atlanta, Georgia. In 2002, the Center was renamed the Yerkes National Primate Research Center, though officially the "Regional" name still applies.

== Demographics ==
Historical population
Census	Pop.	Note	%±
1980	10,534		—
1990	29,137		176.6%
2000	30,927		6.1%
2010	30,943		0.1%
2020	31,275		1.1%

=== Racial and ethnic composition ===
Lakeside racial composition (Hispanics excluded from racial categories) (NH = Non-Hispanic)
Race	Pop 2010	Pop 2020	% 2010	% 2020
White (NH)	23,476	21,416	75.87%	68.48%
Black or African American (NH)	2,962	3,242	9.57%	10.37%
Native American or Alaska Native (NH)	126	93	0.41%	0.30%
Asian (NH)	889	945	2.87%	3.02%
Pacific Islander or Native Hawaiian (NH)	34	51	0.11%	0.16%
Some other race (NH)	74	165	0.24%	0.53%
Two or more races/Multiracial (NH)	869	1,739	2.81%	5.56%
Hispanic or Latino (any race)	2,513	3,624	8.12%	11.59%
Total	30,943	31,275		

=== 2020 census ===
As of the 2020 census, Lakeside had a population of 31,275. The median age was 41.9 years. 21.4% of residents were under the age of 18 and 19.1% of residents were 65 years of age or older. For every 100 females there were 93.7 males, and for every 100 females age 18 and over there were 90.7 males age 18 and over.

100.0% of residents lived in urban areas, while 0.0% lived in rural areas.

There were 11,882 households in Lakeside, including 8,249 families. Of all households, 31.3% had children under the age of 18 living in them. 51.6% were married-couple households, 15.9% were households with a male householder and no spouse or partner present, and 25.8% were households with a female householder and no spouse or partner present. About 21.8% of all households were made up of individuals and 10.4% had someone living alone who was 65 years of age or older.

There were 12,633 housing units, of which 5.9% were vacant. The homeowner vacancy rate was 1.9% and the rental vacancy rate was 7.0%.

Racial composition as of the 2020 census
Race	Number	Percent
White	22,303	71.3%
Black or African American	3,370	10.8%
American Indian and Alaska Native	145	0.5%
Asian	962	3.1%
Native Hawaiian and Other Pacific Islander	54	0.2%
Some other race	1,216	3.9%
Two or more races	3,225	10.3%
Hispanic or Latino (of any race)	3,624	11.6%

=== 2010 census ===
As of the 2010 United States census, there were 30,943 people, 11,758 households, and 9,163 families residing in the CDP.

=== 2000 census ===
As of the census of 2000, there were 30,927 people, 10,753 households, and 8,785 families residing in the CDP. The population density was 2,040.8 inhabitants per square mile (788.0/km^{2}). There were 11,144 housing units at an average density of 735.3 per square mile (283.9/km^{2}). The racial makeup of the CDP was 80.9% White, 10% African American, 0.5% Native American, 3% Asian, 0.1% Pacific Islander, 2.4% from other races, and 3.4% from two or more races. Hispanic or Latino of any race were 8.1% of the population.

As of 2000, there were 10,753 households, out of which 42.1% had children under the age of 18 living with them, 66.6% were married couples living together, 11.5% had a female householder with no husband present, and 18.3% were non-families. 14.1% of all households were made up of individuals, and 4.0% had someone living alone who was 65 years of age or older. The average household size was 2.87 and the average family size was 3.15.

In 2000, in the CDP, the population was spread out, with 28.4% under the age of 18, 8.7% from 18 to 24, 29.4% from 25 to 44, 25.8% from 45 to 64, and 7.6% who were 65 years of age or older. The median age was 36 years. For every 100 females, there were 95.8 males. For every 100 females age 18 and over, there were 92.9 males.

In 2000, the median income for a household in the CDP was $52,013, and the median income for a family was $56,254. Males had a median income of $36,787 versus $25,703 for females. The per capita income for the CDP was $20,785. About 3.6% of families and 4.5% of the population were below the poverty line, including 5.5% of those under age 18 and 6.0% of those age 65 or over.

== Education ==
The largest of three campuses of St. Johns River State College, formerly known as St. Johns River Community College, is located in Lakeside on College Drive. The college is home to Thrasher-Horne Center for the arts, a performing arts theater used for various plays and events. The college has a regular student base of 2,221 students but also hosts many dual enrollment students from Clay County high schools.
