= Ron Jackson Jr. =

American basketball player

Free agent
- Position: Power forward

Personal information
- Born: May 2, 1997 (age 29)
- Listed height: 6 ft 8 in (2.03 m)
- Listed weight: 205 lb (93 kg)

Career information
- High school: Fleming Island (Fleming Island, Florida)
- College: Hillsborough CC (2016–2018); North Carolina A&T (2018–2020)
- NBA draft: 2020: undrafted
- Playing career: 2020–present

Career history
- 2020: BG Göttingen
- 2020–2021: Instituto Atlético Central Córdoba
- 2021–2022: KK Rogaška
- 2022–2023: Basket Torino
- 2023–2024: Kaposvári
- 2024–2025: Anwil Włocławek

Career highlights
- First-team All-MEAC (2020)

Ronald Jackson Jr. (born May 2, 1997) is an American professional basketball player who last played for Anwil Włocławek of the Polish Basketball League (PLK). He played college basketball for North Carolina A&T after transferring from Hillsborough Community College.

== High school career ==
Jackson attended Fleming Island High School in Fleming Island, Florida. He tried out for his high school basketball team as a junior, but was cut. He ended up making the team as a senior.

== College career ==
Jackson walked on to the basketball team at Hillsborough Community College as a redshirt-freshman. As a sophomore, Jackson averaged 13.5 points and 10.5 rebounds per game. He transferred to North Carolina A&T after coach Willie Jones noticed him at a camp and reviewed his footage from Hillsborough. He averaged 7.5 points and 4.6 rebounds per game as a junior. On February 17, 2020, Jackson scored a career-high 28 points and collected eight rebounds in a 77–60 win over North Carolina Central. As a senior, Jackson averaged 15.0 points and 10.4 rebounds per game, earning first-team All-MEAC honors. He was named MEAC defensive player of the week on two occasions, and finished second in the conference with 15 double-doubles during his senior season.

== Professional career ==
On July 20, 2020, Jackson signed with BG Göttingen of the Basketball Bundesliga. He subsequently joined Instituto Atlético Central Córdoba of La Liga Argentina de Básquet, averaging 8.0 points and 4.5 rebounds per game. On August 17, 2021, Jackson signed with KK Rogaška of the Premier A Slovenian Basketball League.

== Personal life ==
Jackson is the son of Ronald and Ellen Jackson. His father served in the United States Marine Corps for 21 years, and his mother was also in the Corps. Jackson's grandmother died from cancer in October 2013. His mother died from multiple sclerosis in 2016.
