= Pat Tomberlin =

American football player (born 1966)

No. 68
- Positions: Guard, tackle

Personal information
- Born: January 29, 1966 (age 60); Jacksonville, Florida, U.S.
- Listed height: 6 ft 2 in (1.88 m)
- Listed weight: 312 lb (142 kg)

Career information
- High school: Middleburg (Middleburg, Florida)
- College: Florida State
- NFL draft: 1989: 4th round, 99th overall pick

Career history
- Indianapolis Colts (1989–1991); Tampa Bay Buccaneers (1993)

Awards and highlights
- First-team All-American (1988); Third-team All-American (1987); First Team All-South Independent (1986); Second Team All-South Independent (1985)

Career NFL statistics
- Games played: 18
- Games started: 10
- Stats at Pro Football Reference

Pat Tomberlin (born January 29, 1966) is an American former professional football player who was a guard and tackle in the National Football League (NFL). He played for the Indianapolis Colts in 1990 and for the Tampa Bay Buccaneers in 1993. He played college football for the Florida State Seminoles and was selected by the Colts in the fourth round of the 1989 NFL draft with the 99th overall pick.
