= Mike Bynum =

American baseball player (born 1978)

- Pitcher
- Born: March 20, 1978 (age 48); Tampa, Florida, U.S.
- Batted: Left Threw: Left

MLB debut
- August 17, 2002, for the San Diego Padres

Last MLB appearance
- October 2, 2004, for the San Diego Padres

MLB statistics
- Win–loss record: 2–5
- Earned run average: 7.73
- Strikeouts: 52
- Stats at Baseball Reference

Teams
- San Diego Padres (2002–2004)

Michael Alan Bynum (born March 20, 1978) is an American former starting pitcher in Major League Baseball who played for the San Diego Padres from 2002 to 2004.

He was drafted by the Boston Red Sox out of Middleburg High School but opted to attend the University of North Carolina. In 1997 and 1998, he played collegiate summer baseball with the Hyannis Mets of the Cape Cod Baseball League and was named a league all-star in 1998. He was selected by the Padres in the first round of the 1999 MLB draft. He was released by the Padres on December 15, 2004.
