= Richard Owens (American football) =

American football player (born 1980)

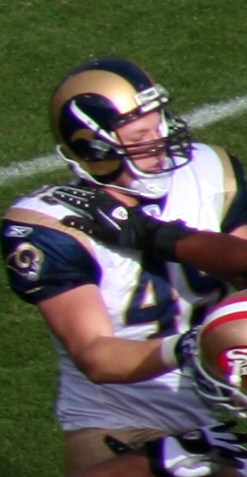

Alabama Crimson Tide
- Title: Tight ends coach

Personal information
- Born: November 4, 1980 (age 46); Middleburg, Florida, U.S.
- Listed height: 6 ft 4 in (1.93 m)
- Listed weight: 273 lb (124 kg)

Career information
- High school: Middleburg
- College: Louisville (1999–2003)
- NFL draft: 2004: undrafted

Career history

Playing
- Minnesota Vikings (2004–2006); St. Louis Rams (2007); New York Jets (2009)*
- * Offseason or practice squad member only

Coaching
- Arkansas (2010–2011) Graduate assistant; UAB (2012) Tight ends coach; UAB (2013) Offensive coordinator & wide receivers coach; UAB (2014) Tight ends coach; South Alabama (2015) Tight ends coach; South Alabama (2016–2017) Offensive line coach; Louisville (2018) Tight ends coach; UAB (2019–2021) Offensive line coach; Georgia Southern (2022) Offensive line coach & run game coordinator; Louisville (2023–2025) Offensive line coach; Alabama (2026–present) Tight ends coach

Career NFL statistics
- Receptions: 17
- Receiving yards: 141
- Receiving touchdowns: 1
- Stats at Pro Football Reference

Richard Owens (born November 4, 1980) is an American former professional football player who was a tight end in the National Football League (NFL). The Minnesota Vikings acquired him as an undrafted free agent in 2004. He played college football for the Louisville Cardinals.

Owens was also a member of the St. Louis Rams and New York Jets.

== Early life ==
As a defensive lineman at Middleburg High School, Owens was a first-team All-Area tight end and second-team All-Area. Owens caught 19 passes for 242 yards and recorded 46 tackles and four sacks as a senior, as well as averaging 14 yards per catch, had 51 tackles, three sacks and four blocked kicks as a junior. He was selected to athletic director's honor roll in his final two years. In 2006, Owens' high school number was retired before a Middleburg High School football game.

== College career ==
While majoring in sports administration at the University of Louisville, Owens played under former Vikings offensive coordinator Scott Linehan. In 1999, he was redshirted as a freshman. The following year, Owens played in all 12 games, starting three. He was selected to Conference USA All-Freshman Team. Although he had just one catch, it went for a 10-yard touchdown in a shutout win over Grambling He also served as the team's backup longsnapper. In 2001, he played in thirteen games, and had three catches on the season, two of which went for touchdowns, including a nine-yard touchdown pass against Southern Miss and a 22-yarder against TCU. In 2002, Owens appeared in all thirteen games with starts in six of the last seven games. He was ranked sixth on the team with a career-high 20 catches for 182 yards and two touchdowns. He caught a career-high six balls for 72 yards and a score against TCU in his first start of the season, and had five catches for 39 yards against Marshall University in the GMAC Bowl. In his senior year, he played in all thirteen games with four starts and finished seventh on the team with twelve catches for 121 yards and three touchdowns. Against Temple, he caught two passes for twelve yards and a touchdown. He also had two receptions for 23 yards and a touchdown at South Florida as well as grabbing two catches for 22 yards vs. Tulane. He also recorded a seven-yard touchdown reception at Cincinnati. Owens finished his career with 36 catches for 371 yards and eight touchdowns, while also serving as the Cardinals' long snapper.

== Professional career ==
=== Minnesota Vikings ===
In his three-year career, he accumulated 16 catches for 123 yards and one touchdown. In 2004, Owens started two of the eight games he played in. He caught eight passes for 69 yards and made three special teams tackles. He joined defensive tackle Spencer Johnson and long snapper Cullen Loeffler as the only rookie free agents to make the opening-day roster in 2004 and was one of eight Vikings rookies to start a 2004 regular-season game. Owens joined LS Cullen Loeffler in a game vs. Chicago, opening at halfback and catching two passes for 16 yards. At Houston, he started his second consecutive game, catching three passes for 17 yards in the 36–28 overtime win. In week two of the 2006 season, Owens caught a 16-yard touchdown pass, his first career touchdown, on a fake field goal attempt, thrown by Vikings kicker Ryan Longwell. On his way to the endzone, Owens dodged an attempted tackle by Carolina Panthers defensive end Julius Peppers. The Vikings won the game 16–13 in overtime.

=== New York Jets ===
Owens signed with the New York Jets on July 14, 2009, and was waived on August 3, 2009.

== Coaching career ==
Following his playing career in the NFL, Owens joined Bobby Petrino's staff at the University of Arkansas prior to the 2010 season. Owens had previously played for Petrino while at Louisville. He spent two years as a graduate assistant working with the tight ends.

In 2012, Owens was hired by Garrick McGee to serve as tight ends coach at the University of Alabama at Birmingham. After one season, Owens was promoted to offensive coordinator and wide receivers coach. In 2014, he reverted to tight ends coach for one season.

In 2015, Owens was hired by the University of South Alabama as the tight ends coach before being promoted to offensive line coach for 2016 and 2017.

In 2018, Owens was hired by University of Louisville as the tight ends coach.

Following one season with Louisville, Owens rejoined UAB as the offensive line coach in 2019. He maintained the position for three years.

In 2022, Owens was hired by Georgia Southern University as the offensive line coach and run game coordinator.

In 2023, Owens began his second stint with Louisville as the offensive line coach.

In 2026, Owens was hired by University of Alabama as the tight ends coach.

== Personal ==
He is married to his high school girlfriend, Tina. Owens volunteered with the Salvation Army during 2004 season and has earned numerous state and national awards for his work with Toys for Tots, Habitat for Humanity, and FHA/HERO.
