= McRae, Florida =

Unincorporated community in Florida, U.S.

Coordinates: 29.8197°N 81.9223°W

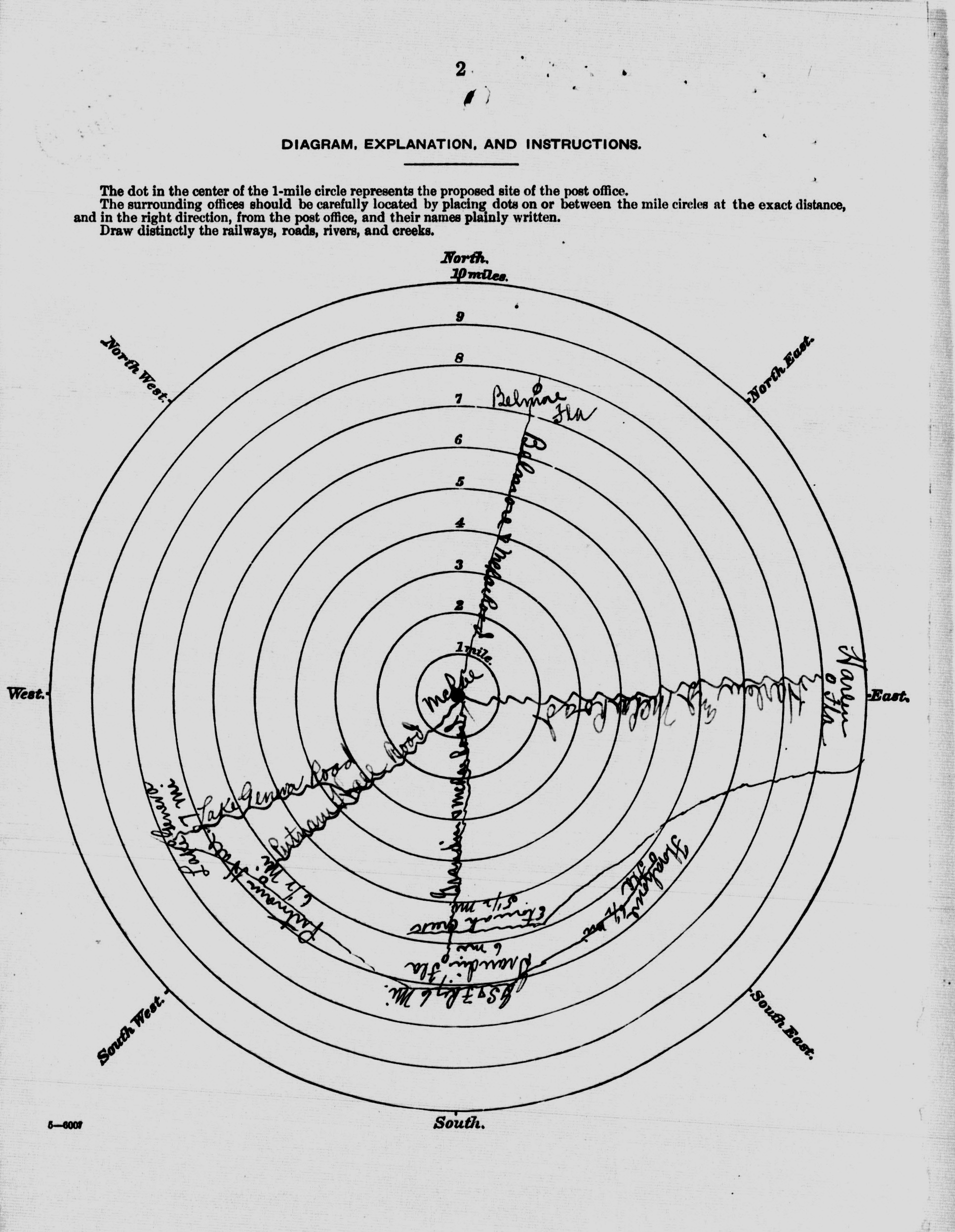
McRae, Florida post office location map 1914

McRae is an archaic placename in Clay County, Florida, United States. It has an elementary school, McRae Elementary School along Clay County Road 315C next door to the Keystone Heights School Bus Compound, and across the street from the Gadara Baptist Church.
