= Keystone Heights Airport =

Airport in Florida, U.S.

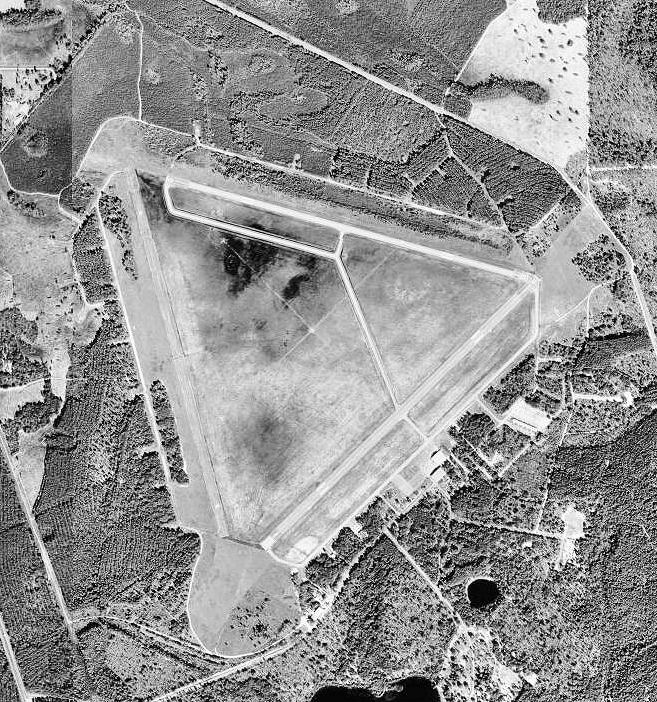
- USGS aerial photo, 1999

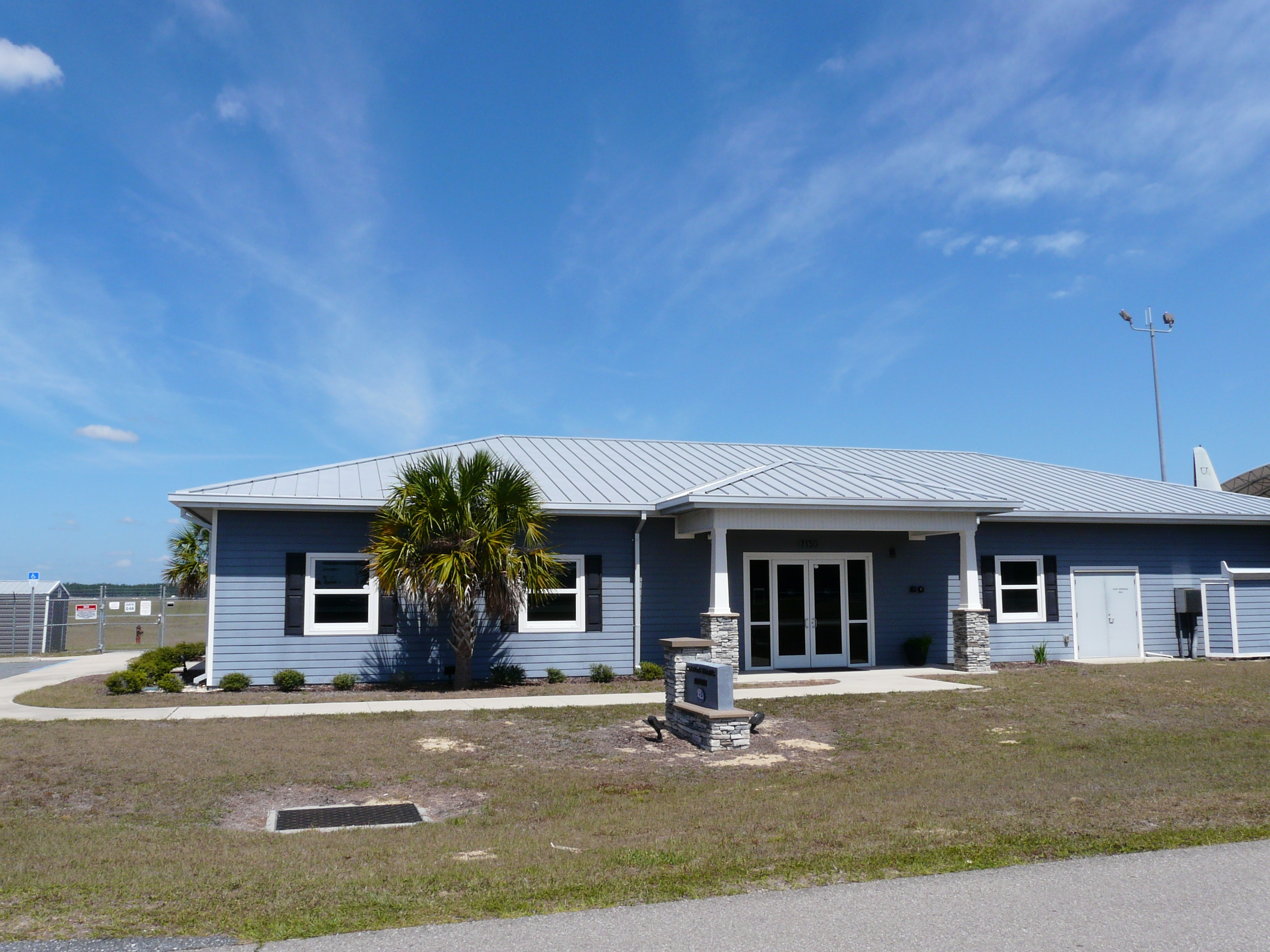
- Airport office
- IATA: none; ICAO: none; FAA LID: 42J

Summary
- Airport type: Public
- Owner: Keystone Heights Airport Authority
- Serves: Keystone Heights, Florida
- Location: Clay & Bradford Counties
- Elevation AMSL: 196 ft (60 m)
- Coordinates: 29°50′41″N 082°02′51″W
- Website: KeystoneAirport.com

Map
- Location of airport in Florida 42J (the United States)

Runways
Direction	Length		Surface
Direction	ft	m	Surface
5/23	5,046	1,538	Asphalt
11/29	4,899	1,493	Asphalt

Statistics (2009)
- Aircraft operations: 32,400
- Based aircraft: 55
- Source: Federal Aviation Administration

Keystone Heights Airport (FAA LID: 42J), is a public use airport located 3 miles north of Keystone Heights, Florida in Clay and Bradford counties.

Owned by the Keystone Heights Airport Authority, this airport is included in the National Plan of Integrated Airport Systems for 2011–2015, which categorized it as a general aviation facility.

The airport is adjacent to Camp Blanding, the Florida National Guard Reservation and "Fly through History" Military Museum and Memorial Park. The museum at Camp Blanding is dedicated to the World War II units that trained there during the early 1940s.

== History ==
The airport was constructed in 1942 as Crystal Lake Airfield, and was commissioned in December 1942 as Keystone Army Airfield (AAF) by the United States Army Air Forces. It was used as part of the Air University's Army Air Forces School of Applied Tactics (AAFSAT) tactical combat simulation school in Central and Northern Florida.

After the end of World War II, the facility was turned over to the City of Keystone Heights in 1947.

== Facilities and aircraft ==
The airport covers an area of 2,476 acres (1,002 ha) at an elevation of 196 feet (60 m) above mean sea level. It has two asphalt paved runways: 5/23 is 5,046 by 100 feet (1,538 x 30 m) and 11/29 is 4,899 by 75 feet (1,493 x 23 m).

Airport operations are conducted through the Keystone Heights Airpark Authority Board, one full-time airport manager, one full-time administration assistant and one full-time operations maintenance manager. The airport is home to three flight schools: Distinguished Flyers, Primary Flight Control and the College of Missionary Aviation. There are two full time FAA certified airframe and power plant mechanics located on the airport.

Separate from aviation services, the Florida International Rally and Motorsport Park, RallyPro Performance Driving School, and International Security Academy are also located at the airport complex. The businesses located on the airport property employ approximately 80 people. The airport also collects and restores NASA artifacts.

As of September 2018, the airport had 32,400 aircraft operations, an average of 88 per day: 95.7% general aviation, 2.8% military, and 1.5% air taxi within a 12-month period. At that time, there were 55 aircraft based at this airport: 85.5% single-engine, 5.5% helicopter, 3.6% multi-engine, 3.6% glider, and 1.8% ultralight.

== See also ==
- List of airports in Florida
