= Keystone Heights, Florida =

- City
- City of Keystone Heights
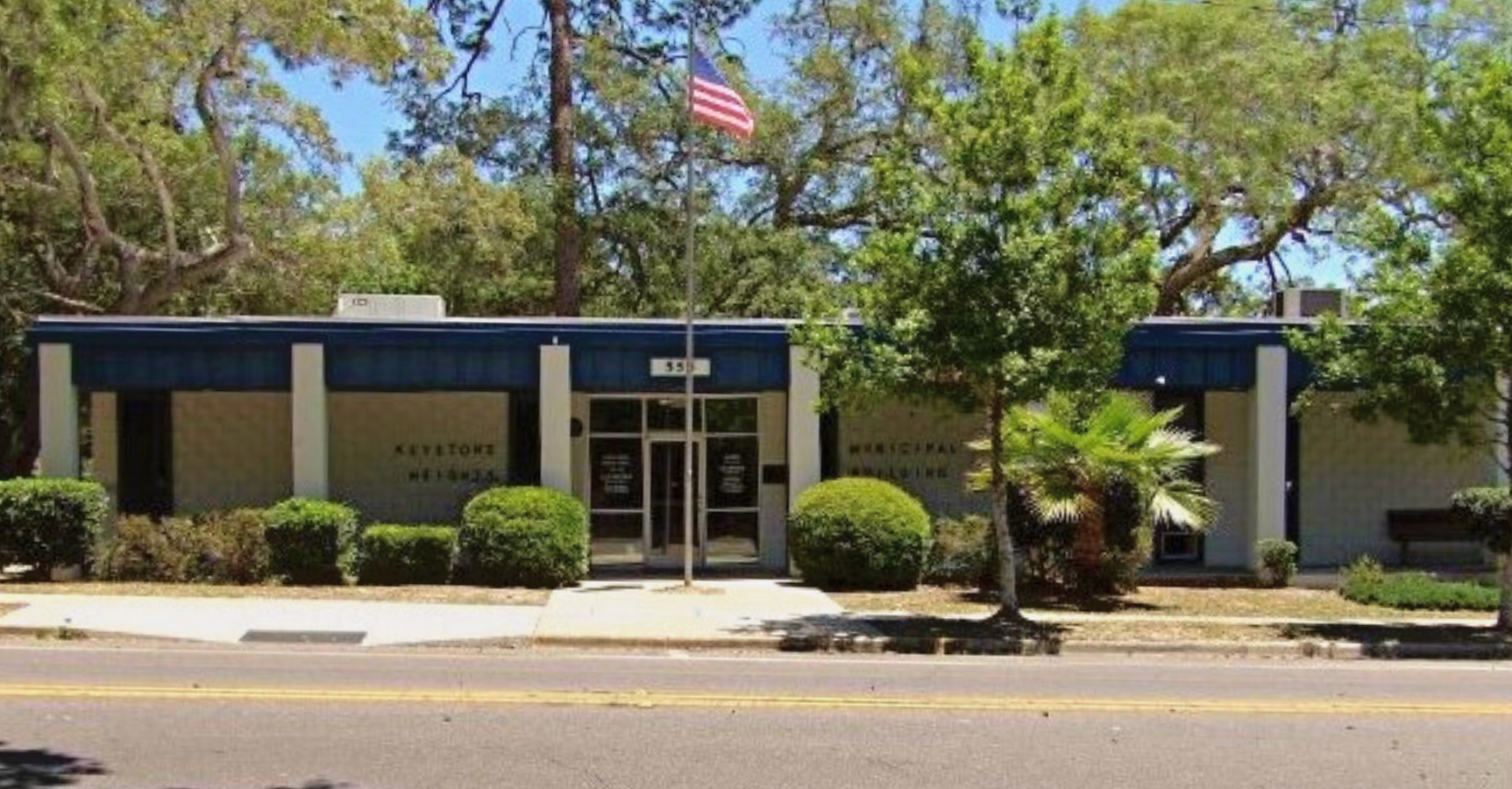
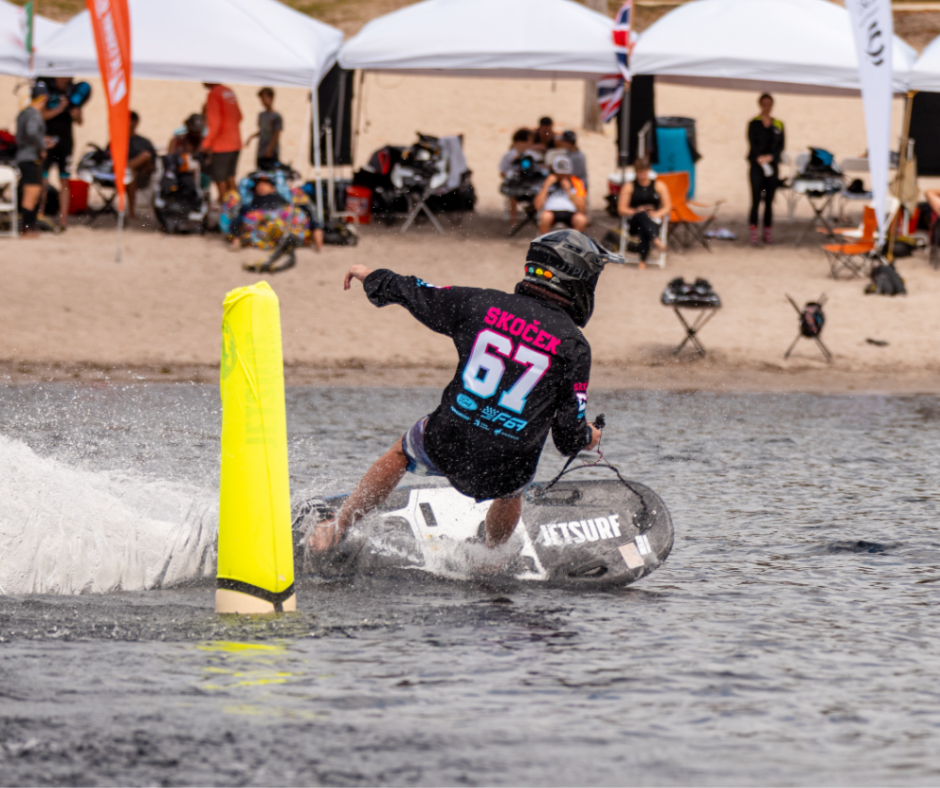
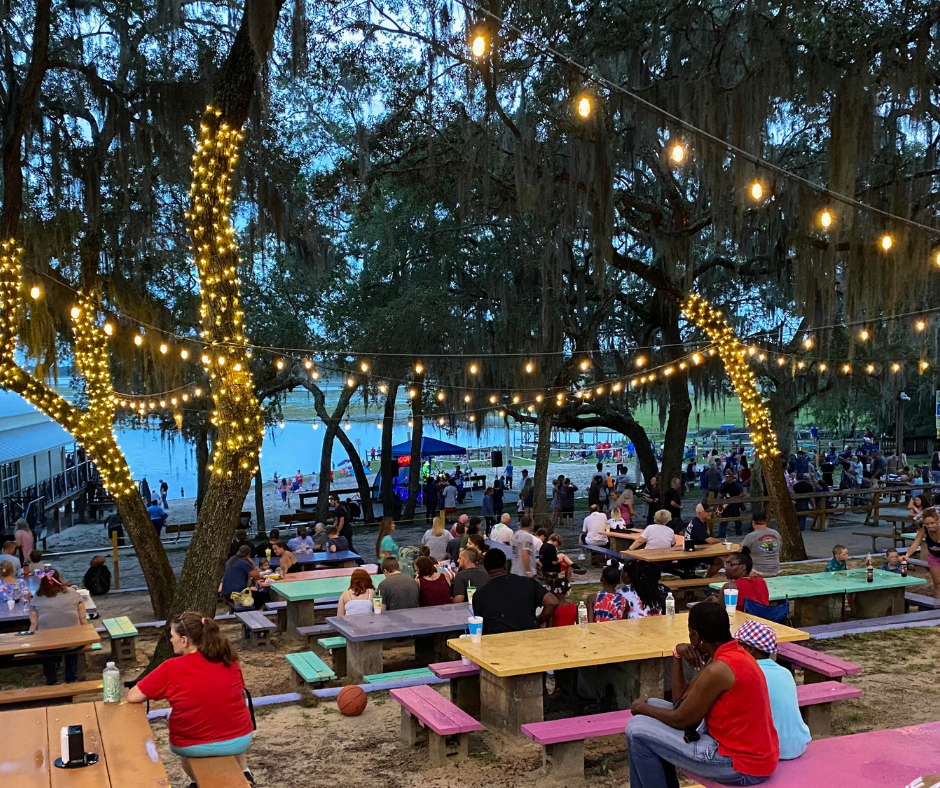
- Images top, left to right: City Hall, Motosurf Racing on Lake Geneva, Keystone Beach

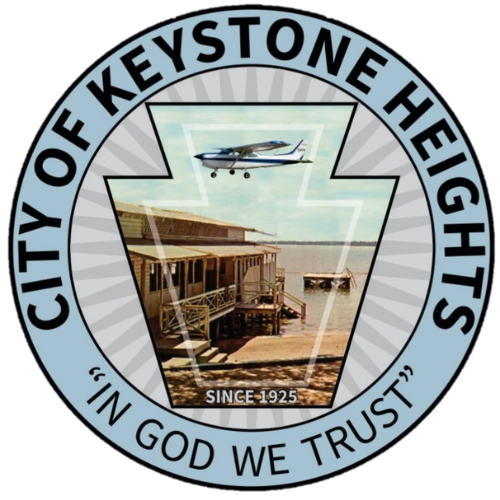
- Seal
- Motto(s): "Progress Since 1925" "In God We Trust"
- Location in Clay County and the state of Florida
- Coordinates: 29°46′52″N 82°02′03″W
- Country: United States
- State: Florida
- County: Clay
- Settled (Brooklyn): 1917
- Incorporated (City of Keystone Heights): 1925

Government
  - Type: Council-Manager
  - Mayor: Nina Rodenroth
  - Vice Mayor: Dave Welch
  - Councilmembers: Ryan Knight, Dan Lewandowski, Brandon Ludwig
  - City Manager: James Booth
  - City Attorney: Richard "Rich" C. Komando

Area
  - Total: 1.09 sq mi (2.82 km^{2})
  - Land: 1.07 sq mi (2.78 km^{2})
  - Water: 0.015 sq mi (0.04 km^{2})
- Elevation: 95 ft (29 m)

Population (2020)
  - Total: 1,446
  - Density: 1,431.0/sq mi (552.52/km^{2})
- Time zone: UTC-5 (Eastern (EST))
  - Summer (DST): UTC-4 (EDT)
- ZIP code: 32656
- Area code: 352
- FIPS code: 12-36475
- GNIS feature ID: 2404827
- Website: www.keystoneheights.us

Keystone Heights is a city located in southwestern Clay County, Florida, United States. It is the southwesternmost city in the Jacksonville, Florida Metropolitan Statistical Area, and is the principal city and primary economic driver of the Lake Region, a region in Florida consisting of southwestern Clay County and parts of Bradford, Putnam, and Alachua counties, known for its many lakes. The population of the city was 1,446 at the 2020 census, up from 1,350 at the 2010 census.

== History ==
=== Early years and founding ===
In 1917, the area that would eventually become known as the city of Keystone Heights was a small community known as "Brooklyn" located along present day State Road 100, about one mile north of the present location of Keystone Heights on Lake Brooklyn.

The community consisted of a large unpainted building called the Brooklyn Hotel; a combination general store and post office; and several small houses scattered about. Property developer John J. Lawrence, who hailed from Pittsburgh, Pennsylvania, noticed the area on a visit to Lake Brooklyn, and instantly became attracted to the region.

In 1920, the Lawrence family completed their home, the first house built in Keystone Heights, which overlooked Lake Geneva, and still lies there today at the corner of Jasmine Avenue & Lawrence Blvd. (State Road 21). After hearing of natural wonders and the many different lakes of the area, other families moved to Keystone, putting a strain on those attempting to build structures within the city. Helping to address the issue, in late 1921, C. Ray Lawrence came to Keystone Heights, and began laying out the streets and lots in the city.

In 1922, J.J. Lawrence and the settlers who were all originally from New York and Pennsylvania, shared in the renaming of the community from "Brooklyn" to "Keystone Heights".

And in 1925, the municipality was officially incorporated as the "City of Keystone Heights", named after Lawrence's home state of Pennsylvania's nickname, the "Keystone State".

=== 20th and 21st centuries ===
==== Keystone Inn era ====
The opening of the Keystone Inn on New Year's Day in 1923 was one of the most significant events in the early history of the city. The inn hosted many festivals and socials, becoming an important centerpiece of the town. The nearby Chautauqua served as an amphitheater attracting various musicians, artists, and speakers from the Chautauqua circuit in New York. Within two years of opening, the Keystone Inn and the community of Keystone Heights were receiving visitors from across the country. The small community had a public beach with a pavilion, picnic grounds and a nine-hole golf course. The University of Florida's football team stayed at the inn before their homecoming games. The inn burned down in October 1954 and was never rebuilt, and the property on which it formerly stood is now a park in front of City Hall.

==== 1960 to present ====
In 1984, an American sycamore seedling, germinated by the United States Forest Service, was planted at the Keystone Heights Library. The "Moon Tree" traveled with Stuart Roosa, a former U.S. Forest Service smokejumper, aboard the Apollo 14 mission on January 31, 1971. Roosa and his five varieties of seeds orbited the Moon 34 times and the resulting seedlings were planted all around the United States and the world.

In the early 2000s, the city saw its tourism industry decline as many of its surrounding lakes, which serve as a primary inflow point for the Floridan aquifer, nearly disappeared. Increased rainfall totals in the 2010s have helped in the recovery of many area lakes including Lake Brooklyn and Lake Geneva. The Black Creek Pipeline, a $43.3 million project started in August 2022 to pump excess water from Black Creek in central Clay County to Alligator Creek just north of Lake Brooklyn, was expected to further restore lake levels.

In the fall of 2021, Keystone Heights served as the host of the internationally televised Nitro Rallycross North America Championship at the Florida International Rally & Motorsports Park at the Keystone Heights Airport. In April 2022, the city's lakefront park, Keystone Beach, hosted the Motosurf Games, a motorized surfboard racing contest on Lake Geneva that was nationally televised on CBS Sports. The games returned to the city in April 2023 as the first race of the 2023 season.

== Geography ==
Keystone Heights is located in Northeast Florida in the southwest corner of Clay County.

The city overlooks the north shore of Lake Geneva and is bordered to the west by Bradford County and to the north by Lake Brooklyn. State Road 21 leads northeast 30 miles (48 km) (via SR 16) to Green Cove Springs, the Clay County seat, and south 18 miles (29 km) to Hawthorne. SR 100 crosses SR 21 and leads northwest 12 miles (19 km) to Starke and southeast 26 miles (42 km) to Palatka. Located in the center of town, Keystone Lake is the only lake entirely within the city limits.

According to the United States Census Bureau, the city has a total area of 1.1 square miles (2.9 km^{2}), of which 0.012 square miles (0.03 km^{2}), or 1.16%, is water.

=== Climate ===
The climate in this area is characterized by hot, humid summers and generally mild winters. According to the Köppen climate classification, the City of Keystone Heights has a humid subtropical climate zone (Cfa).

=== State Park ===
Mike Roess Gold Head Branch State Park is located north of Keystone Heights of off State Road 21. Opening in 1939, it is one of the earliest state parks in Florida. The park was listed on the National Register of Historic Places in 2020.

== Transportation ==
=== Airport ===
The Keystone Heights Airport (FAA LID: 42J) is a public use airport located 3 miles north of the city in Clay and Bradford counties.

Owned by the Keystone Heights Airport Authority, the airport is categorized as a general aviation facility.

=== Roadways ===
The City of Keystone Heights is built around the intersection of two major roads: Florida SR 21 and Florida SR 100.

- SR 21 (Lawrence Boulevard) is Keystone Heights' main thoroughfare and runs north to south, connecting the city to Jacksonville.
- SR 100 (Walker Drive) runs west to east through the city.

== Demographics ==
Historical population
Census	Pop.	Note	%±
1930	107		—
1940	145		35.5%
1950	307		111.7%
1960	655		113.4%
1970	800		22.1%
1980	1,056		32.0%
1990	1,315		24.5%
2000	1,349		2.6%
2010	1,350		0.1%
2020	1,446		7.1%
2023 (est.)	1,536	▲	6.2%
U.S. Decennial Census

=== Racial and ethnic composition ===
Keystone Heights Racial Composition (Hispanics excluded from racial categories) (NH = Non-Hispanic)
Race	Pop 2010	Pop 2020	% 2010	% 2020
White (NH)	1,256	1,210	93.04%	83.68%
Black or African American (NH)	5	25	0.37%	1.73%
Native American or Alaska Native (NH)	10	4	0.74%	0.28%
Asian (NH)	14	20	1.04%	1.38%
Pacific Islander or Native Hawaiian (NH)	0	0	0.00%	0.00%
Some other race (NH)	0	7	0.00%	0.48%
Two or more races/Multiracial (NH)	24	96	1.78%	6.64%
Hispanic or Latino (any race)	41	84	3.04%	5.81%
Total	1,350	1,446		

=== 2020 census ===
As of the 2020 census, Keystone Heights had a population of 1,446. The median age was 38.1 years. 26.2% of residents were under the age of 18 and 18.7% were 65 years of age or older. For every 100 females there were 95.9 males, and for every 100 females age 18 and over there were 88.8 males.

100.0% of residents lived in urban areas, while 0.0% lived in rural areas.

There were 556 households in Keystone Heights, of which 38.1% had children under the age of 18 living in them. Of all households, 48.0% were married-couple households, 12.9% were households with a male householder and no spouse or partner present, and 31.7% were households with a female householder and no spouse or partner present. About 24.8% of all households were made up of individuals and 15.1% had someone living alone who was 65 years of age or older.

There were 595 housing units, of which 6.6% were vacant. The homeowner vacancy rate was 1.4% and the rental vacancy rate was 7.0%.

According to the 2020 American Community Survey (ACS), 29.2% of residents were 0–19 years, 10.9% were 20–29, 17.2% were 30–39, 9.8% were 40–49, 12.2% were 50–59, and 20.8% were 60 years and over.

According to the 2020 ACS, there were 366 families in the city. 36% of households had children under 18 living with them, 40.5% were married couples living together, and 40.9% were individual householders with no spouse or partner present. The average household size was 2.71 and the average family size was 3.13.

In 2020, the median income for a household in the city was $61,250, and the median income for a family was $61,625. Males had a median income of $51,488 versus $49,063 for females. The per capita income was $30,116. About 15.7% of the population were below the poverty line including 28.5% of those under age 18 and 5.7% of those age 65 and over.

In 2020, the ten largest ancestry groups in the city were German (14.4%), Irish (9.9%), English (7.2%), American (4.7%), Italian (4.6%), Polish (2.7%), Dutch (2.4%), Russian (1.5%), Welsh (1.4%), and European (1.3%). Other ancestral groups accounted for 15.8% of the population. The majority of residents (96.4%) speak only English at home. Of those that speak a language other than English at home, the top languages were Vietnamese (1.7%), Spanish (1.1%), and French (0.3%).

In 2020, over half of residents (59.2%) were born in Florida. 37% of residents were born in another state, primarily other southern states. There is a small community of immigrants in Keystone Heights, accounting for 3.5% of the population. Over 92% of these immigrants are naturalized with the majority entering the United States prior to 2010.

Top countries of origin for foreign-born population in Keystone Heights, FL 2020
	Foreign-born Population in Keystone Heights	Percentage of Keystone Heights Population	Foreign-born Population in Florida	Percentage of Florida Population
Philippines	28	1.9%	88,318	0.4%
Scotland	11	0.7%	6,305	0.03%
Honduras	4	0.3%	112,160	0.5%
Dominican Republic	3	0.2%	152,970	0.7%
England	3	0.2%	43,439	0.2%
Other Northern Europe	3	0.2%	2,715	0.01%

=== 2010 census ===
As of the 2010 United States census, there were 1,350 people, 554 households, and 350 families residing in the city.

=== 2000 census ===
As of the census of 2000, there were 1,349 people, 515 households, and 374 families residing in the city. The population density was 296.9 people per square mile (114.6 people/km^{2}). There were 562 housing units at an average density of 123.7 units per square mile (47.8 units/km^{2}). The racial makeup of the city was 96.07% White, 0.44% African American, 0.52% Native American, 0.52% Asian, 0.30% Pacific Islander, 1.19% from other races, and 0.96% from two or more races. Hispanic or Latino of any race were 2.67% of the population.

In 2000, there were 515 households, out of which 36.5% had children under the age of 18 living with them, 56.7% were married couples living together, 12.6% had a female householder with no husband present, and 27.2% were non-families. 24.1% of all households were made up of individuals and 14.0% had someone living alone who was 65 years of age or older. The average household size was 2.62 and the average family size was 3.09.

In 2000, in the city, the population was spread out with 28.1% under the age of 18, 8.1% from 18 to 24, 25.0% from 25 to 44, 21.5% from 45 to 64, and 17.3% who were 65 years of age or older. The median age was 38 years. For every 100 females there were 86.1 males. For every 100 females age 18 and over, there were 81.3 males.

In 2000, the median income for a household in the city was $39,519, and the median income for a family was $47,404. Males had a median income of $37,500 versus $24,886 for females. The per capita income for the city was $19,157. About 5.1% of families and 8.3% of the population were below the poverty line, including 10.5% of those under age 18 and 7.5% of those age 65 or over.

== Government ==
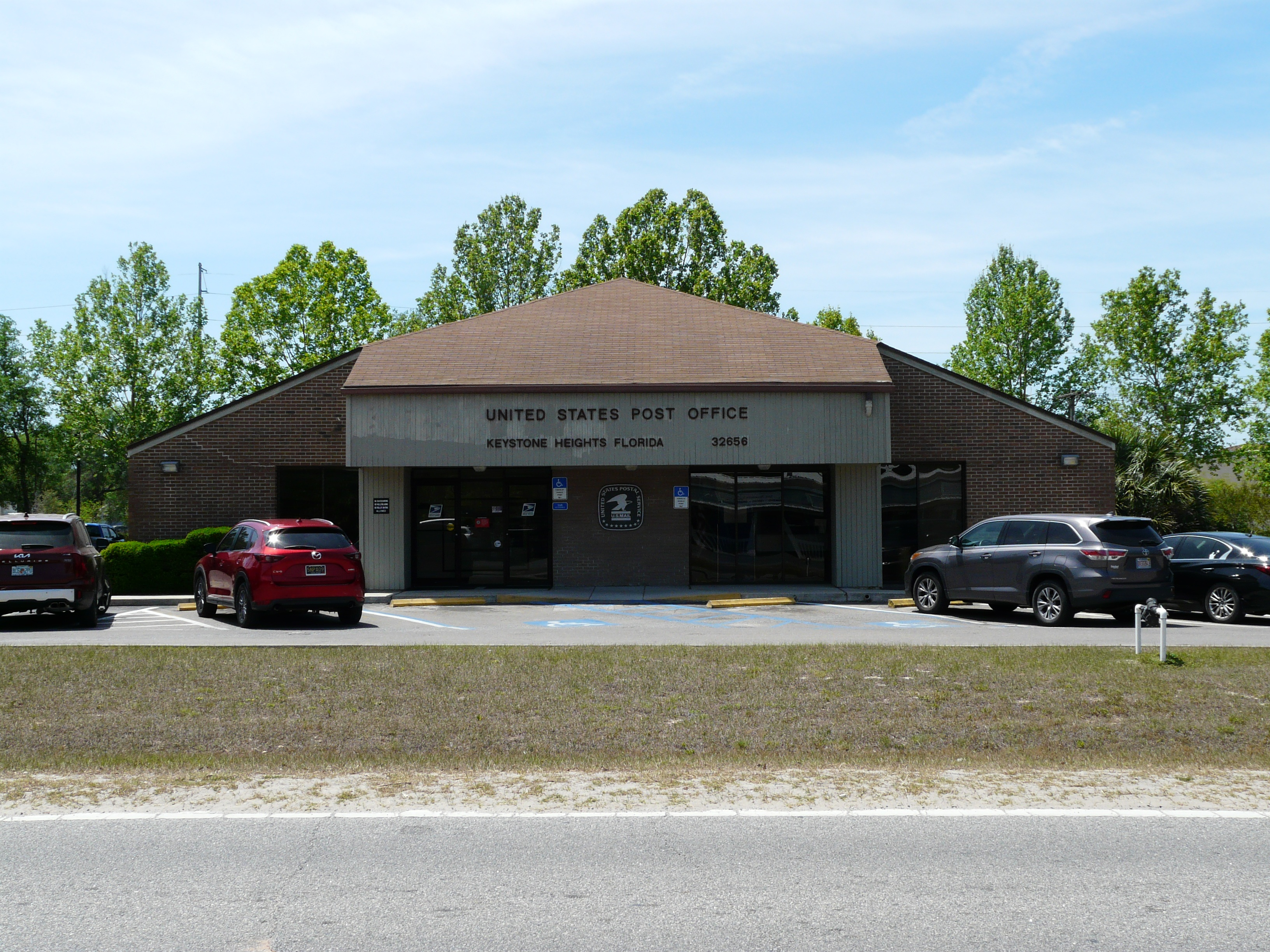
Keystone Heights post office

Keystone Heights has a council–manager form of government, with a mayor, vice mayor and three council members, all elected at large. They serve three-year terms.

The current Mayor is Nina Rodenroth, a retired health care executive, who was elected to the post in 2023.

== Education ==
Schools within Keystone Heights are operated by the Clay County School District.

- Keystone Heights Elementary School
- Keystone Heights Junior/Senior High School

Higher Education

- Santa Fe College's Watson Center located just outside city limits in Bradford County serves southern Clay and Bradford counties as an important learning and cultural institution.

== Notable people ==
- Jimmy Brumbaugh (born 1976), American football player and coach
- Frederick M. Gaige (1890–1976), entomologist and herpetologist
- Andrew Holleran (born 1944), novelist, essayist, and short story writer
- Kristi Overton Johnson (born 1970), former water skiing champion
- Johnell Smith (born 1980), professional basketball player
