= Clay Hill, Florida =

- Unincorporated area
- City of Clay Hill
- Location within Florida Location within the United States Location within North America
- Coordinates: 30°20′13″N 81°39′41″W
- Country: United States
- Florida: Florida
- County: Clay County

Government
  - Type: Strong Mayor–Council
- Elevation: 250–255 ft (76–78 m)
- Time zone: UTC−5 (Eastern (EST))
  - Summer (DST): UTC−4 (EDT)
- ZIP Codes: 32099, 32201–32212, 32214–32241, 32244–32247, 32250, 32254–32260, 32266, 32267, 32277, 32290, 32246
- Area code(s): 904, 324
- Highways: link = Interstate 95 in Florida link = Interstate 795 (Florida)
- Website: Clay County

Clay Hill is an unincorporated community in Clay County, Florida, United States. It is located in the northwest corner of the county and lies along County Road 218. It is a rural community that serves as a bedroom community for the surrounding areas, and home to several working farms. Agricultural products produced in Clay Hill include beef, cattle, hay, and timber. Employers in the area include a sawmill, auto and small engine repair businesses, a welding and fabrication shop, a few tree services, two dollar generals and two convenience stores. The community is home to two elementary schools (Wilkinson Elementary School and Clay Hill Elementary) and one junior high school (Wilkinson Junior High School).
