= Keystone Heights Junior/Senior High School =

Location
- 900 SW Orchid Avenue; Keystone Heights, Florida 32656; United States; 29°46′45″N 82°02′31″W

Information
- School type: Public High School
- Established: 1965
- School district: Clay County School District
- Superintendent: David Broskie
- School number: 0311
- Principal: Laurie Burke
- Faculty: 35 (2024)
- Teaching staff: 68.20 (FTE)
- Grades: 7-12
- Age range: 12-18
- Enrollment: 1,205 (2022–2023)
- Average class size: 20
- Student to teacher ratio: 17.67
- Hours in school day: 7:20 AM-1:40 PM
- Campus: Suburban
- Colors: Royal blue and white
- Athletics: FHSAA
- Athletics conference: FHSAA
- Nickname: Indians
- Accreditation: Southern Association of Colleges and Schools
- USNWR ranking: A
- Website: www.oneclay.net/o/khh/

Keystone Heights Junior/Senior High School (KHHS) is a public high school serving students in the seventh through twelfth grades in Keystone Heights, Clay County, Florida, USA and is part of the Clay County School District.

== Extracurriculars ==
=== Clubs and organizations ===
KHHS supports the following clubs:

- Band
- B.E.A.T. Club
- Drama Club
- French Honor Society/Club
- Future Farmers of America (FFA)
- Interact
- Health Occupations Students of America (HOSA)
- Math Honor Society
- National Honor Society (NHS)
- Pageant Committee
- I Am Second
- National Speech and Debate Association
- Students for Christ
- Strengthening Our Students (Project SOS)
- Student Literacy Council
- Technology Student Association (TSA)
- Thespian Troupe
- Robotics Club
- Video Game Club

=== Sports ===
KHHS competes in Class 2A District 3 of the Florida High School Athletic Association (FHSAA). and fields teams Varsity and Junior Varsity teams in several sports:

- Baseball
- Boys Basketball
- Girls Basketball
- Cheerleading
- Boys Cross Country
- Girls Cross Country
- Football
- Girls Flag Football
- Boys Golf
- Girls Golf
- Boys Soccer
- Girls Soccer
- Softball Fastpitch
- Boys Tennis
- Girls Tennis
- Boys Track
- Girls Track
- Volleyball
- Boys Weightlifting
- Girls Weightlifting

== Performance ==
KHHS is accredited by the Southern Association of Colleges and Schools. For the 2006–2007 school year, it exceeded the state average in all reported categories.
