= Ridgeview High School (Florida) =

Location
- 466 Madison Avenue; Orange Park, FL 32065; United States; 30°7′58″N 81°47′36″W

Information
- Type: Public
- Established: 1998
- School district: Clay County School District
- Principal: Becky Murphy
- Staff: 101.00 (FTE)
- Grades: 9-12
- Age range: 13-22
- Student to teacher ratio: 18.10
- Hours in school day: 7:20 AM-1:40 PM (Monday-Tuesday and Thursday-Friday) 7:20 AM-1:20 PM (Wednesday)
- Campus: Suburban
- Colors: Royal blue, black and white
- Athletics: FHSAA
- Athletics conference: FHSAA
- Mascot: Panthers
- Accreditation: Southern Association of Colleges and Schools
- Affiliation: Academy of Culinary Arts (ACA), National Center for Construction Education and Research (NCCER)
- Website: rhs.oneclay.net

Ridgeview High School is a four-year public high school located in the Clay County School District. The school's mascot is the panther (nicknamed Pounce). Ridgeview had approximately 1,600 students for the 2014–2015 school year, Ridgeview is currently rated an A-school on the FCAT 2.0 grading scale. Deborah Segreto replaced the retiring principal, John Westmoreland, in 2012. Later in 2019, Becky Murphy replaced Deborah Segreto.

== Academies ==
Ridgeview has two academies:

Academy of Culinary Arts (ACA) - The course provides students with fundamental skills in culinary, restaurant, business management, and life. Promoting professionalism through student involvement within culinary endeavors as well as encouraging post-secondary student education and future careers within the culinary and hospitality industries.

The academies allow high school students, regardless of address, to attend from all over the district, providing that the student is accepted into the academy.

== International Baccalaureate Program (IB) ==
Ridgeview High School is the only high school within the Clay County School District to offer the IB program. Like the academies, high school students from all over the district may attend, provided that the student is accepted into the Pre-IB/IB program.

== Fine Arts ==
Ridgeview High School's fine arts programs include band, drama, and chorus.

== Career and Technology Education (CTE) ==
Ridgeview High School CTE programs include Early Childhood Education, Business Education Programs, Construction Technology, and Heating & Air Conditioning.

== Athletics ==
Ridgeview has several sports teams, including cross country, football, golf, slow and fast-pitch softball, swimming, volleyball, basketball, soccer, weightlifting, wrestling, baseball, tennis, and track.
