= Doctors Lake (Florida) =

Lake in the state of Florida, United States

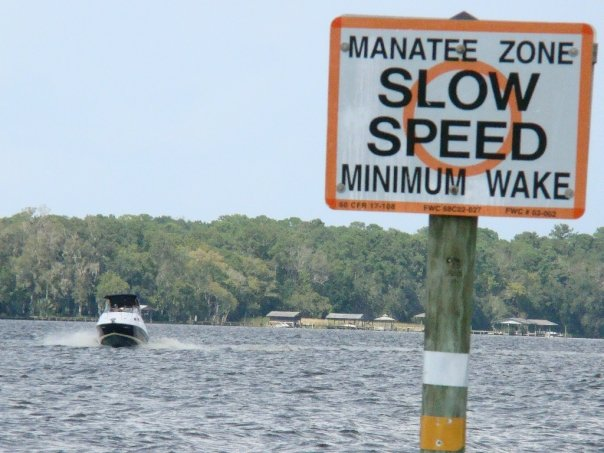

- Location within Florida Location within the United States
- Location: Clay County, Florida
- Coordinates: 30°09′10″N 81°42′23″W
- Type: estuary
- Basin countries: United States
- Surface area: 13 sq mi (34 km^{2})

Doctors Lake is a lake of water located off the St. Johns River in Clay County, Florida, United States. The estuarine nature of the St. Johns causes Doctors Lake to be brackish.

Many docks border the lake for recreational activity such as boating, fishing and waterskiing. To the south, the lake splits in half into two small creeks that flow from swampland.

== History ==
Zephaniah Kingsley originally owned much of the land around Doctors Lake, and established the Laurel Grove Plantation there in the early 1800s. Kingsley captained a ship in the West Indies and was absent from the plantation much of the time. An overseer was left in charge of his 100 or so slaves, while the plantation's house was looked after by a 13-year-old slave girl, Anta Madjiguene Ndiaye, who Kingsley had purchased in Havana in 1806. Kingsley later married the girl and had four children. The community at the north end of the inlet to Doctors Lake is today named "Laurel Grove", while "Kingsley" is a major street in nearby Orange Park.

== Geography ==
Doctors Lake has an area of 13 mi^{2} (34 km^{2}). It is linked to the St. Johns River by Doctors Inlet. U.S. Route 17 crosses the inlet between Orange Park and rural Clay County. To the north is Orange Park, bordering to the west is Lakeside, and to the east is Jacksonville, Florida.

== See also ==
- List of lakes of the St. Johns River
- St. Johns River
- Jacksonville, Florida
