= Fleming Island, Florida =

- Census-designated place
- Location within the state of Florida
- Coordinates: 30°06′58″N 81°43′09″W
- Country: United States
- State: Florida
- County: Clay

Area
  - Total: 23.12 sq mi (59.89 km^{2})
  - Land: 15.84 sq mi (41.02 km^{2})
  - Water: 7.29 sq mi (18.87 km^{2})
- Elevation: 20 ft (6.1 m)

Population (2020)
  - Total: 29,142
  - Density: 1,840.0/sq mi (710.42/km^{2})
- Time zone: UTC-5 (Eastern (EST))
  - Summer (DST): UTC-4 (EDT)
- ZIP codes: 32003
- FIPS code: 12-22660
- GNIS feature ID: 2583342

Fleming Island is an unincorporated community and census-designated place (CDP) in Clay County, Florida, United States. It is located 21 miles (34 km) southwest of downtown Jacksonville, on the western side of the St. Johns River, off US 17. As of the 2020 census the Fleming Island CDP had a population of 29,142, up from 27,126 at the 2010 census. It is part of the Jacksonville, Florida Metropolitan Statistical Area. Fleming Island's ZIP code became 32003 in 2004, giving it a different code from Orange Park, the incorporated town to the north.

== History ==
Fleming Island was an area of Florida settled by Irish immigrant, George Fleming (1760-1821), who received a 1,000-acre land grant from the Spanish governor of East Florida for his military service. In 1790 George Fleming established a plantation called "Hibernia" (in what is now Hibernia, Florida), after the Latin word for Ireland. When he died in 1821, the plantation was left to his son, Col. Lewis Michael Fleming (1798-1862).

In 1942, when the area was undeveloped, the U.S. Navy constructed four asphalt runways on the site and established a Naval Outlying Field designated as NOLF Fleming Island, an auxiliary airfield to Naval Air Station Jacksonville. The Navy abandoned the auxiliary airfield in the 1960s, its runways too short to accommodate the jet aircraft then in operation at nearby NAS Jacksonville and NAS Cecil Field, and in the late 1990s the decaying runways were demolished to make way for current residential development.

== Community ==
Today, Fleming Island is primarily a bedroom community of nearby Jacksonville. Major developments include Eagle Harbor, Pace Island, and Fleming Island Plantation. Fleming Island High School, which opened in 2003, is the only high school on the island.

Fleming Island ranks among the wealthiest zip codes in the Jacksonville area, placing #2 after Ponte Vedra Beach in the March 2013 Jacksonville Business Journal article. In 2021 it was ranked number one in Jacksonville metro in Stacker. The Clay County Public Library headquarters is on Fleming Island, as are the Clay County Soccer Club fields.

There is an 8-foot-wide (2.4 m) sidewalk running the length of Fleming Island, providing about 7 miles (11 km) of walking, jogging and biking. Black Creek Park on the south end of the Fleming Island borders Black Creek and affords bikers and hikers nature trails. There is a park for children at Moccasin Slough on the north end of the island. Moccasin Slough also features a canal navigable by canoe or small boat, dug almost all the way to Doctors Lake. Fleming Island has relatively low crime and consistently scores high in livability.

== Geography ==
The Fleming Island CDP is located in northeastern Clay County, sharing its northern border with the southern town limits of Orange Park. To the northwest is the CDP of Lakeside. To the northeast is a portion of the city of Jacksonville, and due east is Fruit Cove in St. Johns County on the other side of the St. Johns River.

According to the U.S. Census Bureau, the Fleming Island CDP has a total area of 23.1 square miles (59.9 km^{2}), of which 15.8 square miles (41.0 km^{2}) is land and 7.3 square miles (18.9 km^{2}), or 31.56%, is water. Fleming Island is bordered by water or wetlands on all sides: the St. Johns River to the east, Doctors Lake to the north, Black Creek to the south and Swimming Pen Creek to the west. There are wetlands from Swimming Pen Creek to Black Creek that are not navigable.

== Demographics ==
Historical population
Census	Pop.	Note	%±
2010	27,126		—
2020	29,142		7.4%
U.S. Decennial Census

Fleming Island first appeared as a census designated place in the 2010 U.S. census.

=== 2020 census ===
As of the 2020 census, Fleming Island had a population of 29,142. The median age was 44.7 years. 22.5% of residents were under the age of 18 and 19.4% of residents were 65 years of age or older. For every 100 females there were 92.9 males, and for every 100 females age 18 and over there were 90.4 males age 18 and over.

100.0% of residents lived in urban areas, while 0.0% lived in rural areas.

There were 10,826 households in Fleming Island, of which 34.1% had children under the age of 18 living in them. Of all households, 62.8% were married-couple households, 11.8% were households with a male householder and no spouse or partner present, and 21.3% were households with a female householder and no spouse or partner present. About 19.0% of all households were made up of individuals and 9.1% had someone living alone who was 65 years of age or older.

There were 11,438 housing units, of which 5.4% were vacant. The homeowner vacancy rate was 1.5% and the rental vacancy rate was 11.2%.

Racial composition as of the 2020 census
Race	Number	Percent
White	22,920	78.6%
Black or African American	1,621	5.6%
American Indian and Alaska Native	92	0.3%
Asian	1,222	4.2%
Native Hawaiian and Other Pacific Islander	44	0.2%
Some other race	653	2.2%
Two or more races	2,590	8.9%
Hispanic or Latino (of any race)	2,542	8.7%

=== 2010 census ===
As of the 2010 census, there were 27,126 people, 9,821 households, and 7,770 families residing in the CDP. There were 10,440 housing units, 9,821 of which were occupied. The racial makeup of the town was 86.2% White, 5.2% African American, 0.3% Native American, 4.1% Asian, 0.1% Pacific Islander, 1.4% some other race, and 2.7% from two or more races. Hispanic or Latino of any race were 6.4% of the population.

There were 9,821 households, out of which 41.3% had children under the age of 18 living with them, 66.5% were headed by married couples living together, 9.2% had a female householder with no husband present, and 20.9% were non-families. 17.2% of all households were made up of individuals, and 6.3% were someone living alone who was 65 years of age or older. The average household size was 2.76 and the average family size was 3.12.

In the CDP, the population was spread out, with 27.3% under the age of 18, 7.7% from 18 to 24, 23.0% from 25 to 44, 30.8% from 45 to 64, and 11.3% who were 65 years of age or older. The median age was 40.4 years. For every 100 females, there were 96.1 males. For every 100 females age 18 and over, there were 92.4 males.

=== 2010–2012 ACS estimates ===
For the period 2010–12, the estimated median annual income for a household in the CDP was $86,598, and the median income for a family was $96,755. Male full-time workers had a median income of $71,494 versus $47,864 for females. The per capita income for the CDP was $32,102.

== Schools ==
The Clay County School District operates public schools. Fleming Island High School and three elementary schools: Thunderbolt, Fleming Island, and Paterson. They also have a K-12 Florida Charter School, St. Johns Classical Academy.
