= Doctors Inlet, Florida =

Doctors Inlet
- Unincorporated community
- Location within the state of Florida
- Coordinates: 30°6′0″N 81°46′35″W
- Country: United States
- State: Florida
- County: Clay
- Time zone: UTC-5 (Eastern (EST))
  - Summer (DST): UTC-4 (EDT)
- ZIP code: 32030

Doctors Inlet is an unincorporated community in Clay County, Florida, United States. It is located near the intersection of County Roads 220 and 224, and is adjacent to the communities of Middleburg, Orange Park, and Lakeside.
