= Fleming Island High School =

Coordinates: 30.0871°N 81.7127°W

- 2233 Village Square Pkwy. Fleming Island, Florida; United States

Information
- Opened: 2003
- School district: Clay County School District
- Principal: Thomas Pittman
- Teaching staff: 94.60 (FTE)
- Grades: 9 to 12
- Enrollment: 1,862 (2023–2024)
- Student to teacher ratio: 19.68
- Campus size: Suburban
- Colors: Gold; Green
- Team name: Golden Eagles
- Website: fih.oneclay.net

Fleming Island High School (FIHS) is a public senior high school located in Fleming Island, Florida and is part of the Clay County School District. The school opened in 2003 and has an enrollment of approximately 2,000 students. The team name is the Golden Eagles and the school colors are green and gold. In 2013 FIHS made U.S. News & World Report's list of Best High Schools.

== Notable alumni ==
- Ryan Aplin (2008), offensive coordinator for the Georgia Southern Eagles
- Ian Silberman (2010), former NFL player
- Ron Jackson Jr. (2015), basketball player who plays overseas
- Olufolasade Adamolekun (2019), Jamaica National Team soccer player
- Lia Godfrey (2020), NWSL soccer player
- London Jenkins (2024), United States National Team flag football player
