= Clay County, Florida =

County in Florida, United States

- County
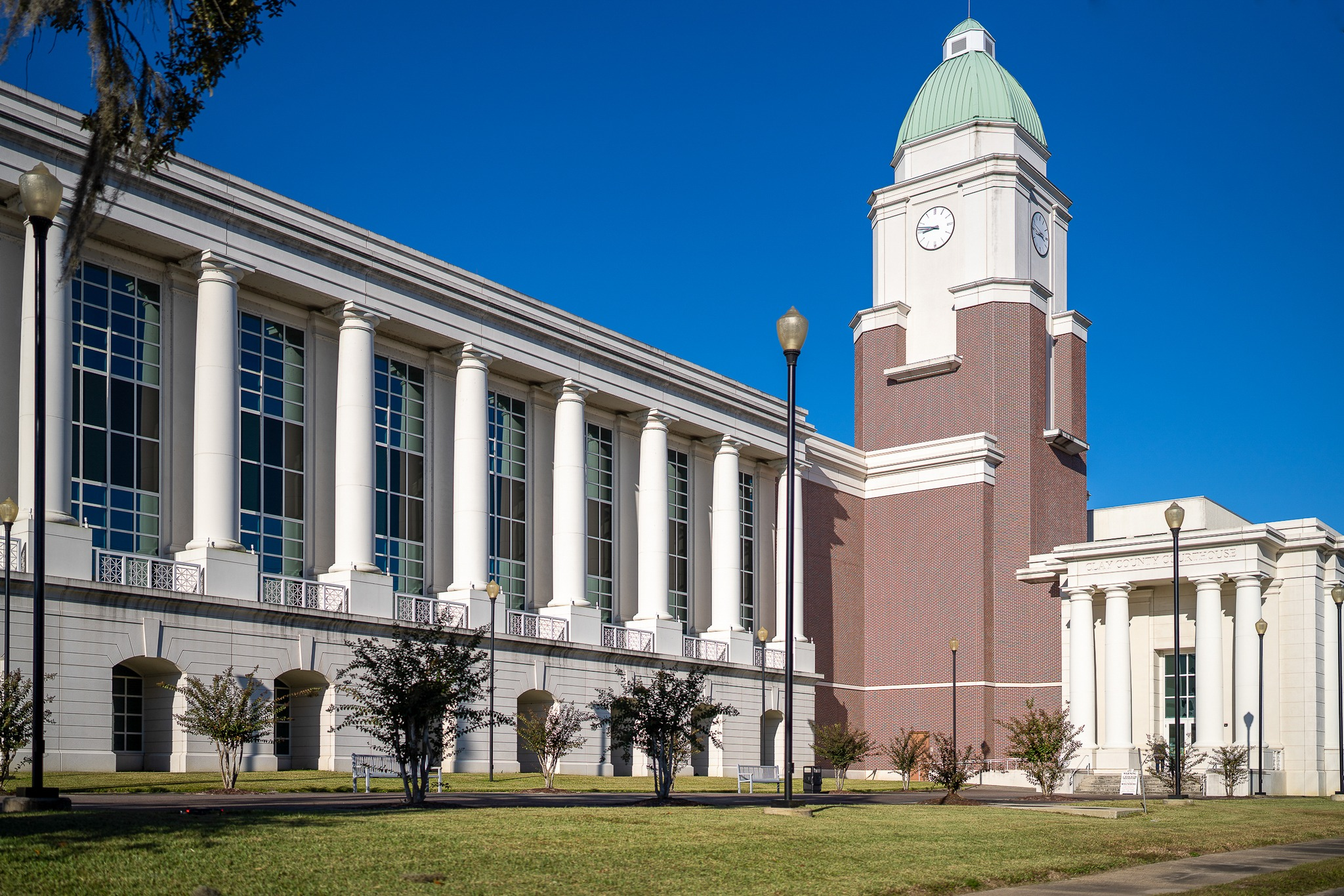
- Clay County Courthouse

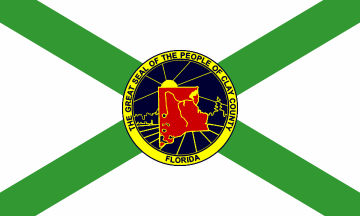
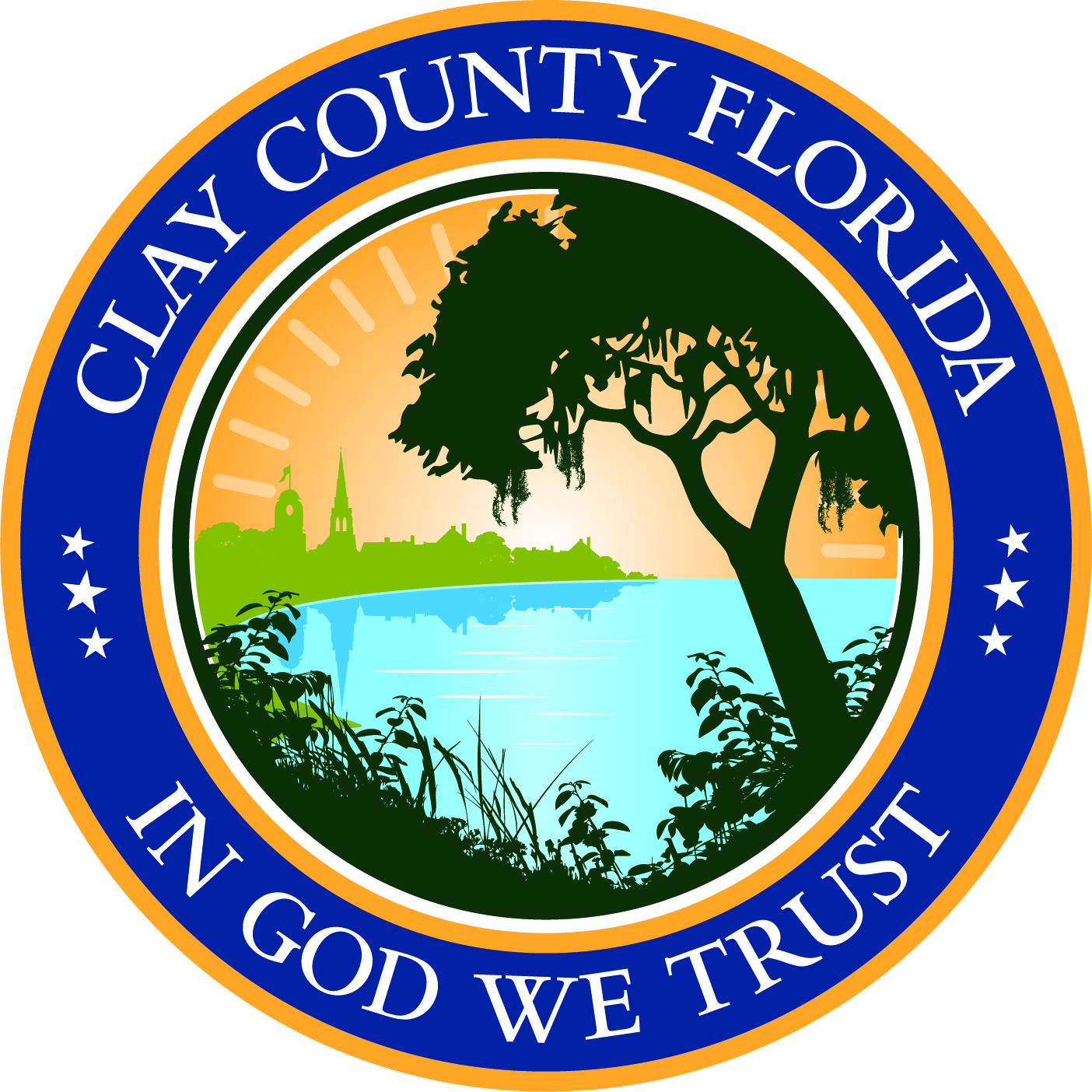
- Flag Seal
- Motto: In God We Trust
- Location within the U.S. state of Florida
- Coordinates: 29°59′N 81°52′W
- Country: United States
- State: Florida
- Founded: December 31, 1858
- Named for: Henry Clay
- Seat: Green Cove Springs
- Largest city: Lakeside

Area
  - Total: 644 sq mi (1,667 km^{2})
  - Land: 605 sq mi (1,566 km^{2})
  - Water: 39 sq mi (101 km^{2}) 6.1%

Population (2020)
  - Total: 218,245
  - Estimate (2025): 239,593 ▲
  - Density: 380/sq mi (148/km^{2})
- Time zone: UTC−5 (Eastern)
  - Summer (DST): UTC−4 (EDT)
- ZIP Codes: 32003, 32043, 32065, 32068, 32073, 32079, 32091, 32234, 32656, 32666
- Area code: 352, 904, 324
- Congressional district: 4th
- Website: www.claycountygov.com

Clay County is located in the northeastern part of the U.S. state of Florida along the west bank of the St. Johns River. As of 2020, the population was 218,245 and in 2023, that number increased to 232,439, making it the third largest county in the Jacksonville metropolitan area. While most of the county is unincorporated, there are 4 municipalities with Green Cove Springs being the county seat and the unincorporated Lakeside CDP being the largest place. It is named in honor of Henry Clay, a famous American statesman, member of the United States Senate from Kentucky, and United States Secretary of State in the 19th century.

Since 1990, Clay County has transformed into a largely suburban county with the third highest household median income in Florida behind neighboring St. Johns County and Santa Rosa County. This transformation has come as workers from Jacksonville, and to a smaller extent other nearby cities such as St. Augustine and Gainesville, have moved into newly built residential subdivisions. Over half of workers living in Clay County work in another county, which is the highest rate of any county in Florida. As such, the county has the third highest average commute time in the state at almost 33 minutes. With the population expected to surpass 300,000 residents by 2040, projects such as the First Coast Expressway are being constructed to alleviate chronic congestion on major roadways in the county such as Blanding Blvd and U.S. 17.

Clay County is known for its rich military history with major current and former installations such as Branan Air Field, Naval Air Station Green Cove Springs, and Camp Blanding all being located in the county. The county also attracts many tourists due to its abundance of natural water features. Many notable lakes such as Kingsley Lake, Lake Asbury, Doctors Lake, Lake Geneva, and Lake Brooklyn are all located in the county. Black Creek begins at the St. Johns River just north of Green Cove Springs and runs through the central portion of the county.

== History ==
=== Early history ===
The surrounding region was part of St. Johns culture, an early archaeological culture that spanned from 500 BC until the 17th Century, with the arrival of European explorers. At the time of first contact by French Huguenot explorer René Goulaine de Laudonnière, the region was inhabited by the Agua Dulce people under the Timucua chiefdom of Utina. With the arrival of the Spanish colonists to St. Augustine in the East, the wars and skirmishes with the rival tribes to the north and west, and the defeat of the Huguenots at Fort Caroline by the newly arrived Spanish, the Utina chiefdom collapsed and the surviving natives fled South, leaving the area virtually uninhabited until the late 18th Century with attempts to resettle the area by the Spanish in the newly reclaimed Spanish East Florida.

In 1803, Zephaniah Kingsley, purchased the site of Laurel Grove (later rebuilt into the Town of Orange Park) to establish a plantation for planting oranges, and coffee, and for trading slaves. In 1816, George J. F. Clarke purchased land to build a sawmill on the site that grew into the city of Green Cove Springs. During the Patriot War, Laurel Grove was seized by the insurgents, forcing Kingsley to flee, but not before razing the plantation in order to keep it out of rebel hands.

After the war ended and the eventual annexation of Spanish East Florida to the United States, the area saw an influx of tourists and settlers.

=== Establishment of Clay County ===
Clay County was created on December 31, 1858, from a section of Duval County. The area was once a popular destination for tourists because of its springs and mild climate. Steamboats brought them to various hotels in Green Cove Springs, such as the St. Elmo, Clarendon, and Oakland. President Grover Cleveland was the most prominent of such tourists and had spring water shipped to the White House. Clay County's popularity among tourists peaked during the last three decades of the 19th century. Tourism later waned because of Henry Flagler's extension of the Florida East Coast Railway to other destinations such as Palm Beach and Miami.

The military has also played an important role in Clay County history. In 1939, Camp Blanding opened on Kingsley Lake in southwest Clay County. The Florida National Guard developed this 28,000-acre (110 km^{2}) complex. During World War II, it trained over 90,000 troops and became the fourth-largest "city" in the state. In Green Cove Springs, Lee Field was a flight training center. After World War II, Lee Field became a base for the mothball fleet. Although Lee Field closed in the early 1960s, Camp Blanding continues to operate today as a base for military training. Clay County is also a popular choice of residence for military personnel stationed on bases in nearby Duval County (NAS Jacksonville, NS Mayport, and, before it closed, NAS Cecil Field).

== Geography ==
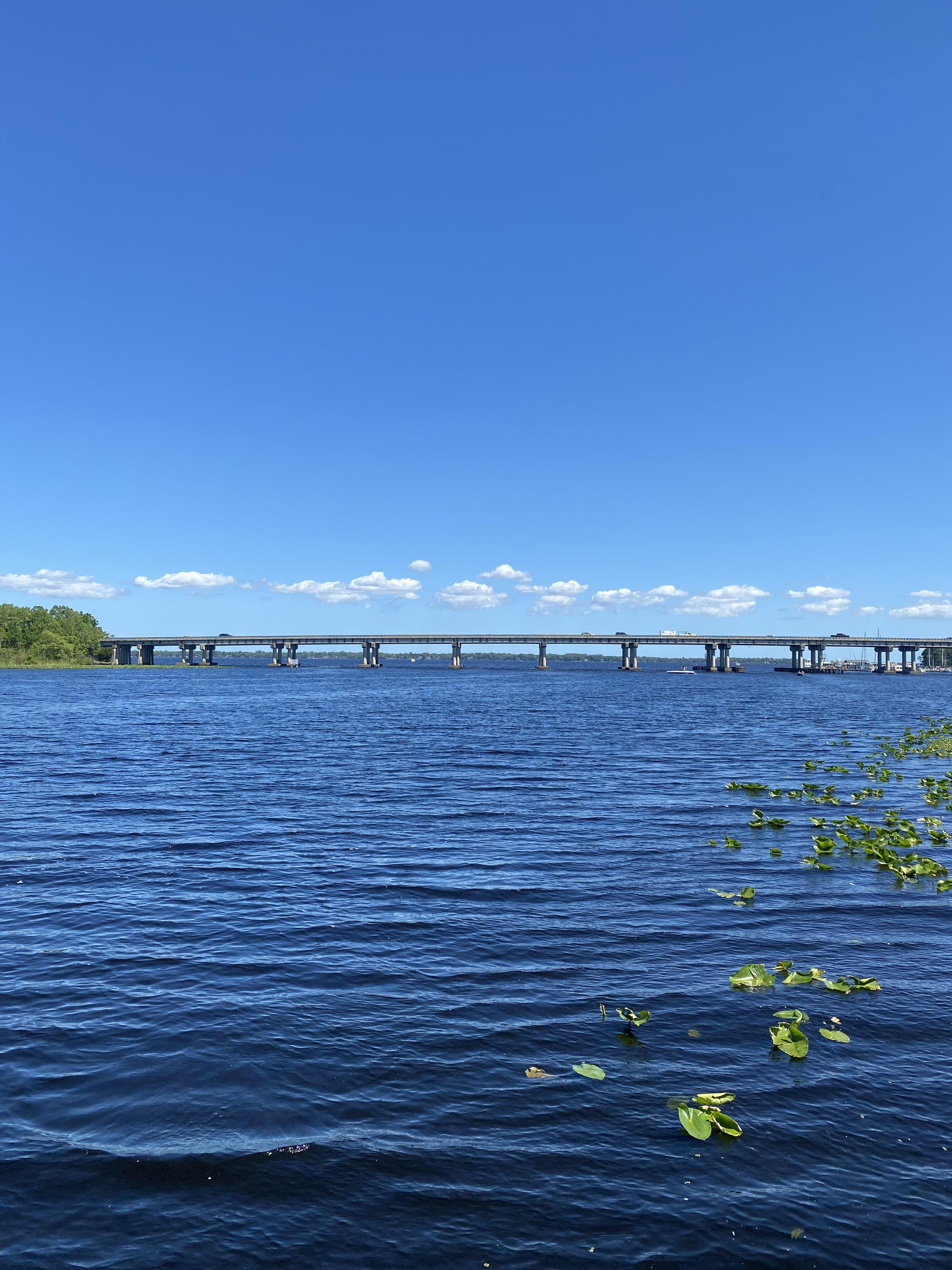
Mouth of Black Creek where it meets the St. Johns River with the U.S. 17 bridge in the background

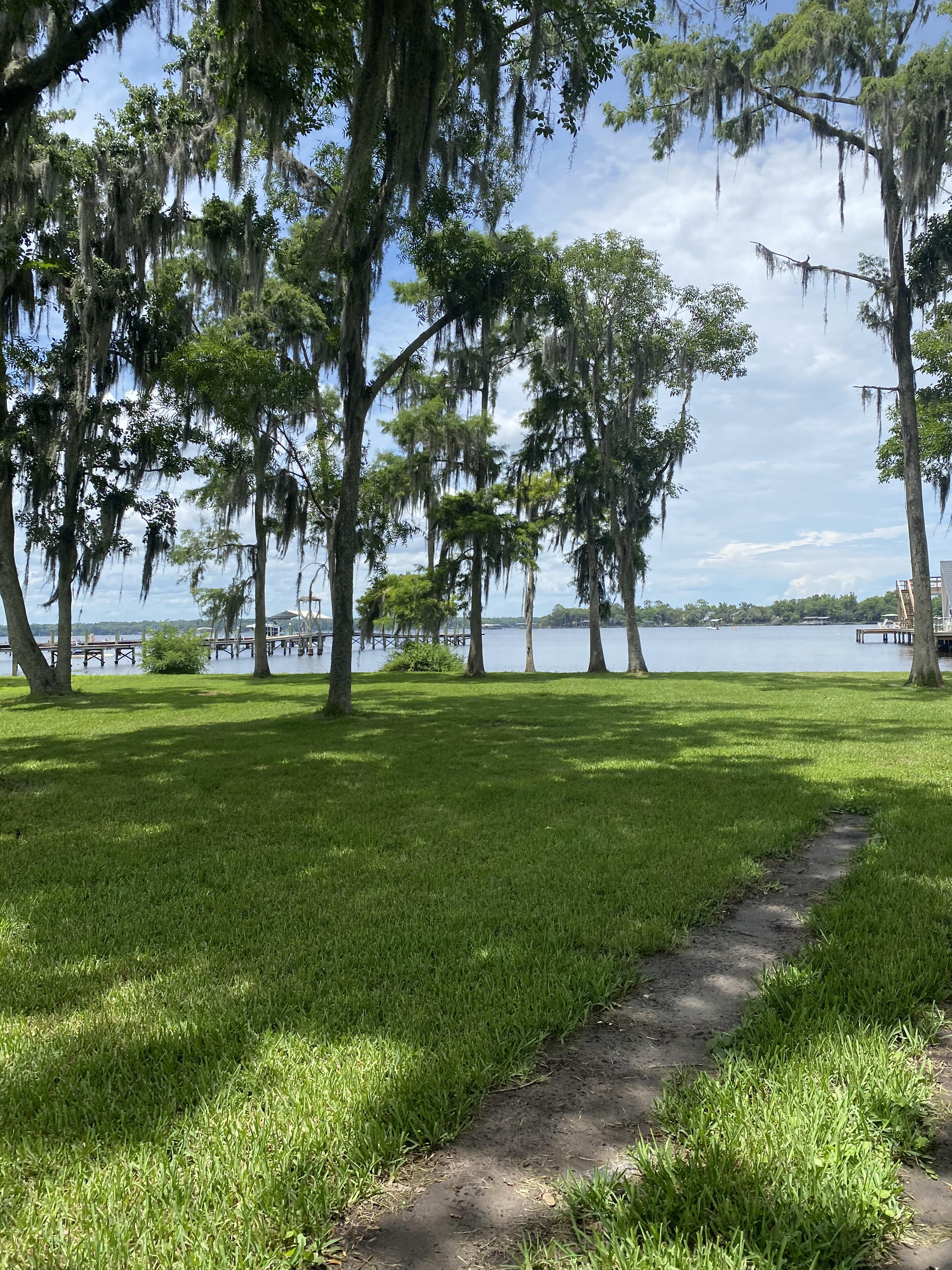
Doctors Lake in Fleming Island

According to the U.S. Census Bureau, the county has a total area of 644 square miles (1,670 km^{2}), of which 604 square miles (1,560 km^{2}) are land and 39 square miles (100 km^{2}) (6.1%) are covered by water. The average elevation in Clay County is 95 feet above sea level with the highest point, located on the western border in Camp Blanding, being 259 feet. The southwestern portion of the county features many lakes which contribute to the Floridan Aquifer and are an important source of water for the surrounding region. During the 2000s, high growth rates in Northeast Florida caused many of the lakes to dry up as demand for water increased. To combat this, a project began in August 2022 to construct a pipeline from Black Creek in the central part of the county to Alligator Creek in Keystone Heights. This pipeline is expected to restore the water levels in the lakes to their former high points.

Clay County is home to Goldhead Branch State Park, Belmore State Forest, and Jennings State Forest. These protected areas provide critical habitat to many native species of plants and animals, as well as provide a buffer around Camp Blanding from surrounding development.

=== Adjacent counties ===
- Duval County, Florida – north
- St. Johns County, Florida – east
- Putnam County, Florida – south
- Bradford County, Florida – west
- Baker County, Florida – northwest

== Transportation ==
=== Airports ===
- Keystone Heights Airport

=== Railroads ===
- CSX A-Line – Runs north to south through the eastern portion of the county beginning in Orange Park to the north and exiting the county south of Green Cove Springs
- CSX S-Line – Runs very briefly through the northwest corner of the county concurrent with US-301 near Maxville

=== Major highways ===
Before the opening of the first segment of the First Coast Expressway in 2019, Clay County was the largest county in Florida without a limited-access highway. Once complete, this project will connect Interstate 10 in Jacksonville with Interstate 95 in St. Johns County and will result in the replacement of the current Shands Bridge with a new, expanded bridge.

- US 17 is the main south to north road running through eastern Clay County.
- US 301 runs south and north through western Clay County from Lawtey in Bradford County into western Duval County.
- SR 16 runs west to east from Starke in Bradford County passing around Camp Blanding, and later through Penney Farms. In Green Cove Springs, the route briefly joins southbound US 17 before returning to the east to cross the Shands Bridge.
- SR 21 runs south to north entering Clay County twice. First from Putnam County and later from Bradford County.
- SR 23, the future First Coast Expressway.
- SR 100 runs northwest to southeast from Bradford County through Keystone Heights and Lake Geneva into Putnam County.

=== Public transportation ===
- Clay Community Transportation – A shuttle service operated by the Jacksonville Transportation Authority with 4 lines and stops throughout the county
- Clay Express-Select – An executive-style bus service that takes riders from multiple stops in Orange Park and Fleming Island to the Jacksonville Regional Transportation Center in Downtown Jacksonville

== Demographics ==
Historical population
Census	Pop.	Note	%±
1860	1,914		—
1870	2,098		9.6%
1880	2,838		35.3%
1890	5,154		81.6%
1900	5,635		9.3%
1910	6,116		8.5%
1920	5,621		−8.1%
1930	6,859		22.0%
1940	6,468		−5.7%
1950	14,323		121.4%
1960	19,535		36.4%
1970	32,059		64.1%
1980	67,052		109.2%
1990	105,986		58.1%
2000	140,814		32.9%
2010	190,865		35.5%
2020	218,245		14.3%
2025 (est.)	239,593	▲	9.8%
U.S. Decennial Census; 1790-1960 1900-1990; 1990-2000 2010-2019

=== 2022 Census Estimates ===
Clay County, FL Demographic Profile
Racial and ethnic Composition	2022
White alone (non-Hispanic)	69.3%
Black alone (non-Hispanic)	12.7%
Hispanic or Latino	11.4%
Asian alone (non-Hispanic)	3.1%
Other Race alone (non-Hispanic)	0.6%
Two or more races (non-Hispanic)	2.9%
Population	226,589

A map of the racial demographics of Clay County, Florida by Census tract Legend: Non-Hispanic White 40–50% 50–60% 60–70% 70–80% 80–90% >90%

According to 2022 census estimates, Clay County's population increased to 226,589. This increase was fueled exclusively by in-migration to the county. In all, 9,101 people have moved to Clay County since 2020 with over 95% of that growth coming from domestic migration.

Since 2020, the county has experienced 5,643 deaths compared to 4,846 births resulting in a natural change of -797. This has corresponded with an increase in the median age to 40.5 years.

=== 2020 census ===
As of the 2020 census, the county had a population of 218,245. The median age was 40.2 years. 23.9% of residents were under the age of 18 and 17.2% of residents were 65 years of age or older. For every 100 females there were 94.7 males, and for every 100 females age 18 and over there were 91.9 males age 18 and over.

The racial makeup of the county was 71.0% White, 12.2% Black or African American, 0.4% American Indian and Alaska Native, 3.1% Asian, 0.2% Native Hawaiian and Pacific Islander, 3.4% from some other race, and 9.7% from two or more races. Hispanic or Latino residents of any race comprised 10.6% of the population.

85.6% of residents lived in urban areas, while 14.4% lived in rural areas.

There were 78,939 households in the county, of which 35.4% had children under the age of 18 living in them, 55.0% were married-couple households, 15.0% were households with a male householder and no spouse or partner present, and 23.5% were households with a female householder and no spouse or partner present. About 20.1% of all households were made up of individuals and 9.0% had someone living alone who was 65 years of age or older. The census counted 57,587 families residing in the county.

There were 85,049 housing units, of which 7.2% were vacant. Among occupied housing units, 73.7% were owner-occupied and 26.3% were renter-occupied. The homeowner vacancy rate was 2.2% and the rental vacancy rate was 7.9%.

=== Racial and ethnic composition ===
Clay County, Florida – Racial and ethnic composition Note: the US Census treats Hispanic/Latino as an ethnic category. This table excludes Latinos from the racial categories and assigns them to a separate category. Hispanics/Latinos may be of any race.
Race / Ethnicity (NH = Non-Hispanic)	Pop 1980	Pop 1990	Pop 2000	Pop 2010	Pop 2020	% 1980	% 1990	% 2000	% 2010	% 2020
White alone (NH)	61,779	95,794	119,587	147,257	148,986	92.14%	90.38%	84.93%	77.15%	68.27%
Black or African American alone (NH)	3,419	5,405	9,243	18,085	25,621	5.10%	5.10%	6.56%	9.48%	11.74%
Native American or Alaska Native alone (NH)	118	346	599	734	680	0.18%	0.33%	0.43%	0.38%	0.31%
Asian alone (NH)	585	1,633	2,754	5,429	6,626	0.87%	1.54%	1.96%	2.84%	3.04%
Native Hawaiian or Pacific Islander alone (NH)	x	x	96	179	363	x	x	0.07%	0.09%	0.17%
Other race alone (NH)	19	44	192	306	1,064	0.03%	0.04%	0.14%	0.16%	0.49%
Mixed race or Multiracial (NH)	x	x	2,284	4,266	11,771	x	x	1.62%	2.24%	5.39%
Hispanic or Latino (any race)	1,132	2,764	6,059	14,609	23,134	1.69%	2.61%	4.30%	7.65%	10.60%
Total	67,052	105,986	140,814	190,865	218,245	100.00%	100.00%	100.00%	100.00%	100.00%

=== 2021 American Community Survey ===
According to the 2021 ACS, the median age in Clay County was 40.9 years. 25.6% of residents were 0–19 years, 11.4% were 20–29, 13% were 30–39, 13.3% were 40–49, 14.1% were 50–59, and 22.6% were 60 years and over.

There were 80,459 households in the county, of which 31.9% had children under 18 living with them, 54.6% were married couples living together, and 38.3% were individual householders with no spouse or partner present. The average household size was 2.75 and the average family size was 3.15.

The median income for a household in the county was $76,679, and the median income for a family was $85,196. Males had a median income of $47,393 versus $35,103 for females. The per capita income was $33,364. About 7.1% of the population were below the poverty line including 13.5% of those under age 18 and 6% of those age 65 and over.

The ten largest reported ancestry groups in the county were Irish (11.7%), English (11.6%), German (10.7%), American (4.7%), Italian (3.5%), Scottish (3.1%), French (2.2%), Polish (1.9%), European (1.5%), and Scotch-Irish (1.1%).

45% of residents were born in Florida and 46% were born in another state. The majority of in-migration comes from other Southern states and the Northeast. There is a growing community of Puerto Ricans in Clay County, with the number of residents born on the island numbering 3,590.

Clay County has the second highest percentage of Filipino immigrants in Florida, after neighboring Duval County, with 1.1% of residents hailing from the Philippines. In total, 6.1% of residents were foreign-born with over 68% being naturalized citizens and the majority entering the United States prior to 2010.

Top countries of origin for foreign-born population in Clay County, FL
	Foreign-born Population in Clay County	Percentage of Clay County Population	Foreign-born Population in Florida	Percentage of Florida Population
Philippines	2,449	1.1%	88,318	0.4%
Mexico	1,097	0.5%	287,765	1.3%
Cuba	715	0.3%	973,959	4.5%
Haiti	645	0.3%	341,943	1.6%
Peru	534	0.3%	89,858	0.4%
Canada	492	0.2%	94,586	0.4%
El Salvador	489	0.2%	43,975	0.2%
Guatemala	436	0.2%	102,110	0.5%
India	429	0.2%	97,800	0.5%
China	408	0.2%	48,308	0.2%

Language Spoken at Home	2019	2010	2000	1980
English	89.3%	90.5%	92.3%	96.4%
Spanish	6.4%	5.2%	4.2%	1.4%
Tagalog	1.4%	1%	0.9%	0.3%
German or West Germanic Languages	0.6%	0.4%	0.5%	0.4%
French, Haitian, or Cajun	0.5%	0.6%	0.5%	0.4%
Other Languages	1.8%	2.3%	1.6%	1.1%

== Government ==
Clay County's large population in unincorporated areas is served by the Clay County Sheriff's Office and Clay County Fire & Rescue. The current Sheriff, Michelle Cook (R), was elected in 2020.

=== Board of County Commissioners ===
Clay County's government is led by a five-member Board of County Commissioners, each elected from a single-member district. The county commission appoints a County Manager as chief administrative officer of the county. Howard Wannamaker currently serves as the County Manager. The current office holders are:

- District 1: John Sgromolo
- District 2: Alexandra Compere
- District 3: Jim Renninger
- District 4: Betsy Condon
- District 5: Kristen Burke

As of 2025, all elected County Commissioners are registered Republicans.

=== Federal representation ===
All of Clay County is located in Florida's 4th Congressional District of the U.S. House of Representatives. The current representative is Aaron Bean (R).

=== State representation ===
Clay County is located in Florida's 6th Senate District represented by Republican Jennifer Bradley. In the Florida House of Representatives, District 11 is located entirely within the northern portion of the county and is represented by Republican Sam Garrison. Florida House District 20 covers the central and southern parts of the county and is represented by Republican Bobby Payne.

== Politics ==
=== Voter registration ===
According to the Florida Department of State, Republicans account for a majority of registered voters in Clay County.

Clay County Voter Registration & Party Enrollment as of July 22, 2024
Political Party	Total Voters	Percentage
Republican	84,892	56.10%
Democratic	30,583	20.21%
Independent	31,232	20.64%
Third Parties	4,598	3.04%
Total	151,305	100%

=== Statewide elections ===
Politically, Clay County is one of the most reliably Republican counties in the state during presidential elections outside of the Panhandle. It last supported a Democrat for president in 1960, and Jimmy Carter is the last Democrat to manage even 40 percent of the county's vote. However, conservative Democrats continued to hold most state and local offices well into the 1980s.

United States presidential election results for Clay County, Florida
Year	Republican		Democratic		Third party(ies)	
Year	No.	%	No.	%	No.	%
1892	0	0.00%	404	85.41%	69	14.59%
1896	230	37.64%	355	58.10%	26	4.26%
1900	91	21.02%	308	71.13%	34	7.85%
1904	50	15.38%	247	76.00%	28	8.62%
1908	122	21.86%	355	63.62%	81	14.52%
1912	26	6.67%	279	71.54%	85	21.79%
1916	79	14.29%	380	68.72%	94	17.00%
1920	486	43.28%	558	49.69%	79	7.03%
1924	171	28.84%	339	57.17%	83	14.00%
1928	1,088	72.05%	394	26.09%	28	1.85%
1932	556	30.20%	1,285	69.80%	0	0.00%
1936	562	31.00%	1,251	69.00%	0	0.00%
1940	498	25.08%	1,488	74.92%	0	0.00%
1944	520	29.36%	1,251	70.64%	0	0.00%
1948	722	26.33%	1,544	56.31%	476	17.36%
1952	2,116	49.07%	2,196	50.93%	0	0.00%
1956	2,372	53.67%	2,048	46.33%	0	0.00%
1960	2,515	47.97%	2,728	52.03%	0	0.00%
1964	3,805	54.99%	3,114	45.01%	0	0.00%
1968	3,251	35.14%	1,954	21.12%	4,046	43.74%
1972	10,467	85.53%	1,748	14.28%	23	0.19%
1976	8,468	49.38%	8,410	49.04%	270	1.57%
1980	15,643	64.85%	7,630	31.63%	849	3.52%
1984	21,571	79.72%	5,489	20.28%	0	0.00%
1988	25,942	76.67%	7,773	22.97%	122	0.36%
1992	26,360	57.95%	10,610	23.33%	8,515	18.72%
1996	30,370	64.49%	13,259	28.16%	3,463	7.35%
2000	41,903	72.80%	14,668	25.48%	988	1.72%
2004	62,078	76.17%	18,971	23.28%	446	0.55%
2008	67,203	70.95%	26,697	28.18%	823	0.87%
2012	70,022	72.33%	25,759	26.61%	1,024	1.06%
2016	74,963	69.85%	27,822	25.93%	4,532	4.22%
2020	84,480	67.77%	38,317	30.74%	1,863	1.49%
2024	87,711	68.90%	37,926	29.79%	1,665	1.31%

United States Senate election results for Clay County, Florida1
Year	Republican		Democratic		Third party(ies)	
Year	No.	%	No.	%	No.	%
2024	86,368	68.67%	37,009	29.42%	2,399	1.91%

United States Senate election results for Clay County, Florida3
Year	Republican		Democratic		Third party(ies)	
Year	No.	%	No.	%	No.	%
2022	65,972	73.26%	23,054	25.60%	1,023	1.14%

Florida Gubernatorial election results for Clay County
Year	Republican		Democratic		Third party(ies)	
Year	No.	%	No.	%	No.	%
1994	24,290	70.86%	9,986	29.13%	1	0.00%
1998	26,585	76.29%	8,261	23.71%	2	0.01%
2002	39,347	77.38%	11,233	22.09%	272	0.53%
2006	37,632	73.00%	12,610	24.46%	1,309	2.54%
2010	44,547	69.97%	17,246	27.09%	1,874	2.94%
2014	49,330	72.40%	15,948	23.41%	2,861	4.20%
2018	64,401	68.89%	28,150	30.11%	931	1.00%
2022	67,292	74.67%	22,187	24.62%	640	0.71%

== Museums ==
- Clay County Historical Museum, Green Cove Springs
- Middleburg Historic District, Middleburg
- Black Heritage Museum, Middleburg
- Camp Blanding Museum And Memorial Park, Camp Blanding

== Education ==
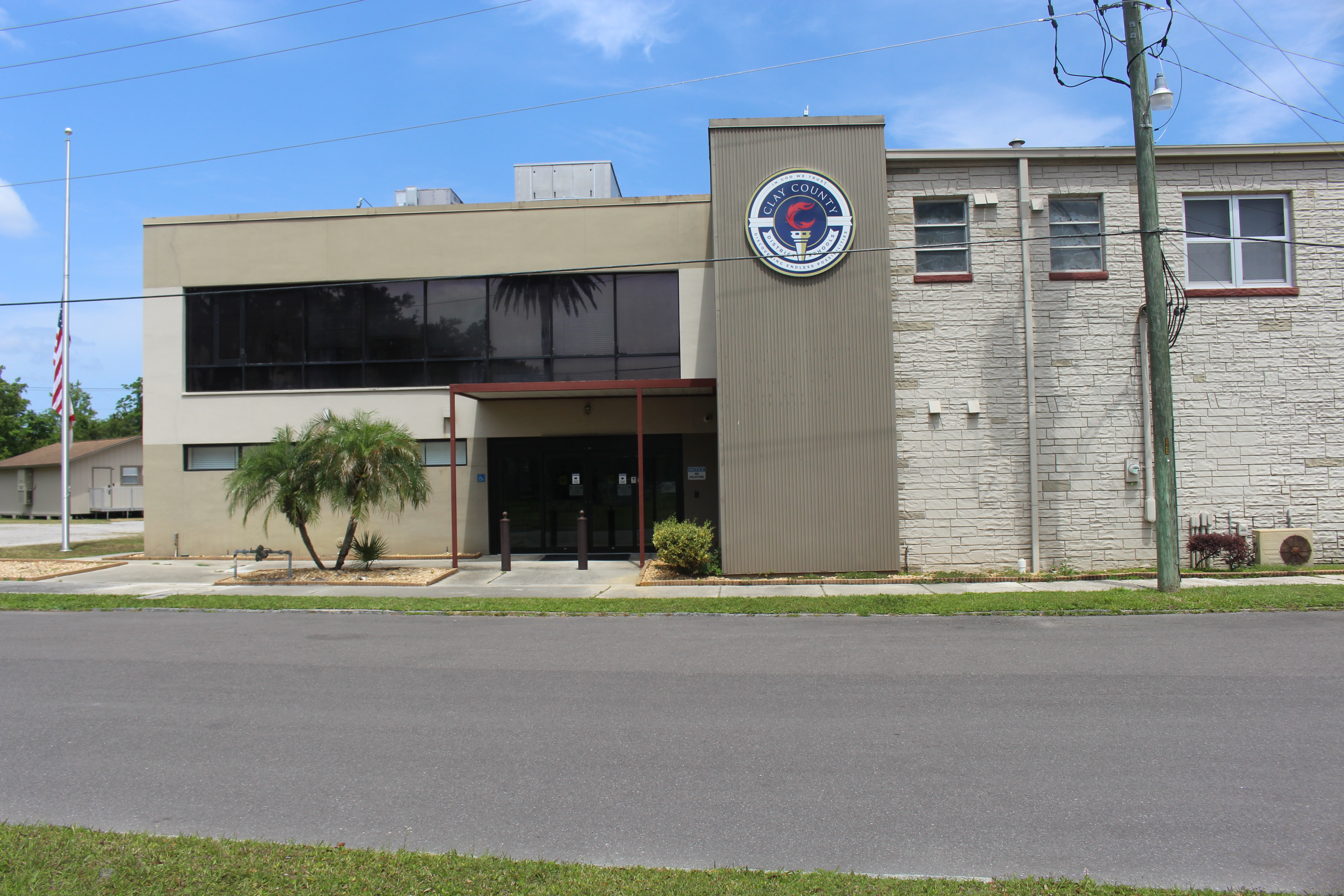
Clay County School District headquarters

The Clay County School District operates 42 public schools, with currently 28 elementary schools, five junior high schools, six high schools, and one junior/senior high school.

As of the 2021-22 school year, the school district received an "A" grade from the Florida Department of Education and was ranked the tenth top school district in the state. In 2023, U.S. News and World Report ranked Fleming Island High School the top high school in Clay County and 91st in Florida.

=== Libraries ===
The Clay County Public Library System consists of five branches:

- Green Cove Springs Library
- Headquarters Library (Fleming Island)
- Keystone Heights Library
- Middleburg-Clay Hill Library
- Orange Park Library

The first public library in Clay County was made up of a small collection established by the Village Improvement Association within the county. Other small libraries were established by other organizations within Clay County. In 1961, representatives from different women's organizations in the county started a movement to establish a library system within the county, and resulted in the Clay County Board of County Commissioners beginning to set aside funds to create the county library system. Due to their efforts, the first public library in Clay County was opened in 1961 in Green Cove Springs. The Green Cove Springs Library purchased a bookmobile in 1962 and began to provide outreach services to different areas within Clay County that same year. In 1962 two more public libraries opened in Clay County, the Keystone Heights Library and the Orange Park Library. A fire destroyed the Keystone Heights Library in February 1962. The Keystone Heights Library was relocated to a new building in Theme Park in 1964. The Headquarters Library in Green Cove Springs became open to the public in 1970 after a population boom caused the need for a new library. In 1976, the Orange Park Library moved to a larger location within the town of Orange Park. The population growth experienced in the county during the late 1970s necessitated the development of the Middleburg-Clay Hill Library, which first opened in a storefront in the late 1970s. The permanent facility for this library was completed and opened to the public in 1986.

== Communities ==
=== Cities ===
- Green Cove Springs
- Keystone Heights

=== Towns ===
- Orange Park
- Penney Farms

=== Census-designated places ===
- Asbury Lake
- Bellair-Meadowbrook Terrace
- Fleming Island
- Lakeside
- Middleburg
- Oakleaf Plantation

=== Other unincorporated communities ===
- Belmore
- Clay Hill
- Doctors Inlet
- Hibernia
- Lake Geneva
- McRae
- Virginia Village
- Camp Blanding/Kingsley Lake

== See also ==
- National Register of Historic Places listings in Clay County, Florida
