= Florida State Road 206 =

State highway in Florida, United States

State Road 206
- Florida State Road 206 highlighted in red

Route information
- Maintained by FDOT
- Length: 14.485 mi (23.311 km)

Major junctions
- West end: SR 207 near Spuds
- I-95 near Dupont Center; US 1 at Dupont Center
- East end: SR A1A in Crescent Beach

Location
- Country: United States
- State: Florida
- Counties: St. Johns

Highway system
- Florida State Highway System; Interstate; US; State; Former; Pre‑1945; Toll; Scenic
← SR 202	→ SR 207

State Road 206 (SR 206) is a 14.5-mile-long (23.3 km) 2-lane-wide, state highway completely within St. Johns County in the northeastern part of the U.S. state of Florida. It extends from SR 207 south-southwest of Spuds to SR A1A in Crescent Beach, two blocks west of the Atlantic Ocean.

== Route description ==
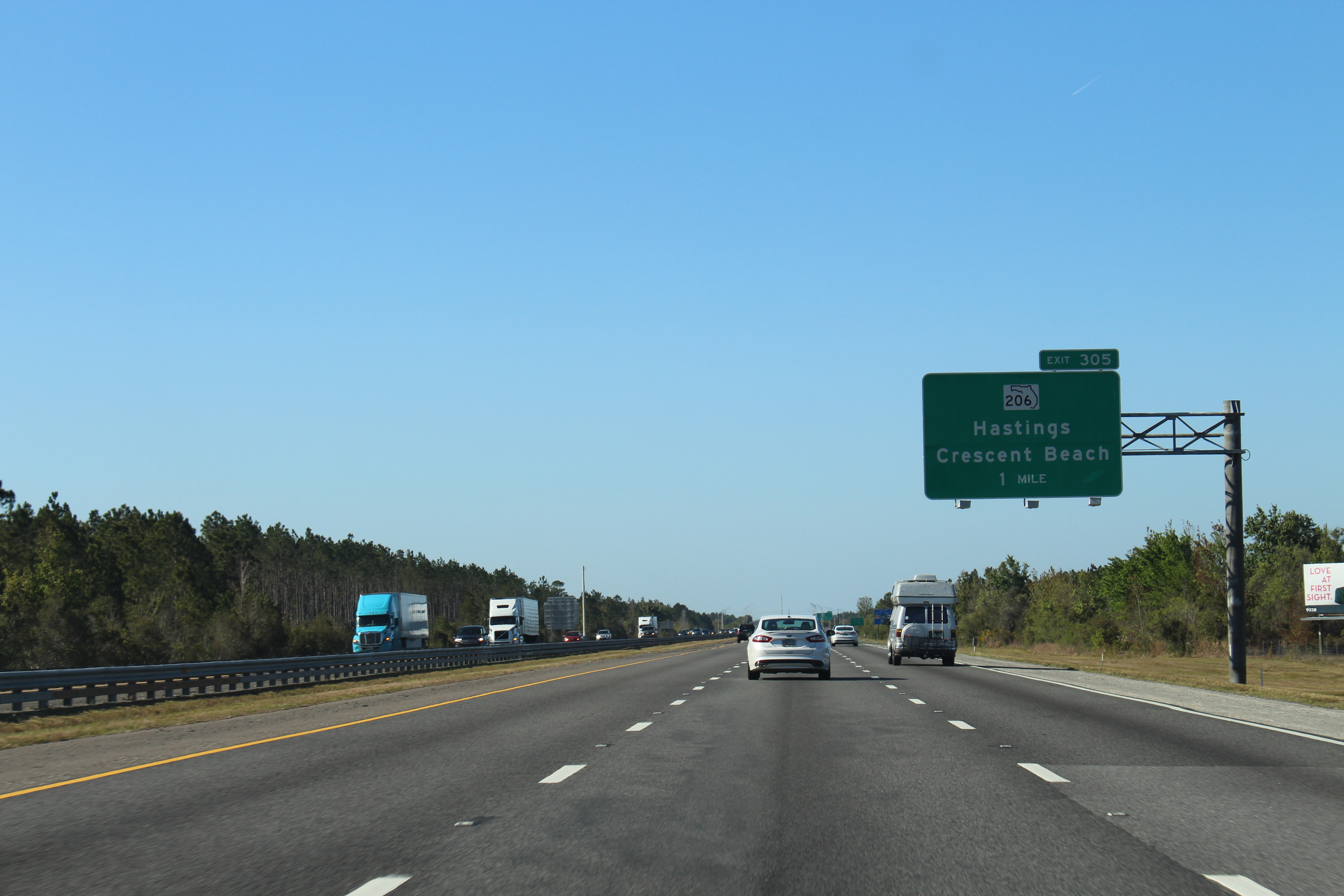
I-95 exit for SR 206

SR 206 begins at an intersection with SR 207 in Spuds, near Deep Creek, a small tributary of the St. Johns River. From there, SR 206 travels east through uninhabited farmland, crossing Interstate 95 (I-95). East of I-95, the road is mostly uninhabited, but establishments slowly emerge, especially east of US 1 in Dupont Center. SR 206 continues east through a partially established residential area before crossing the Intracoastal Waterway, entering Crescent Beach and terminating at SR A1A.

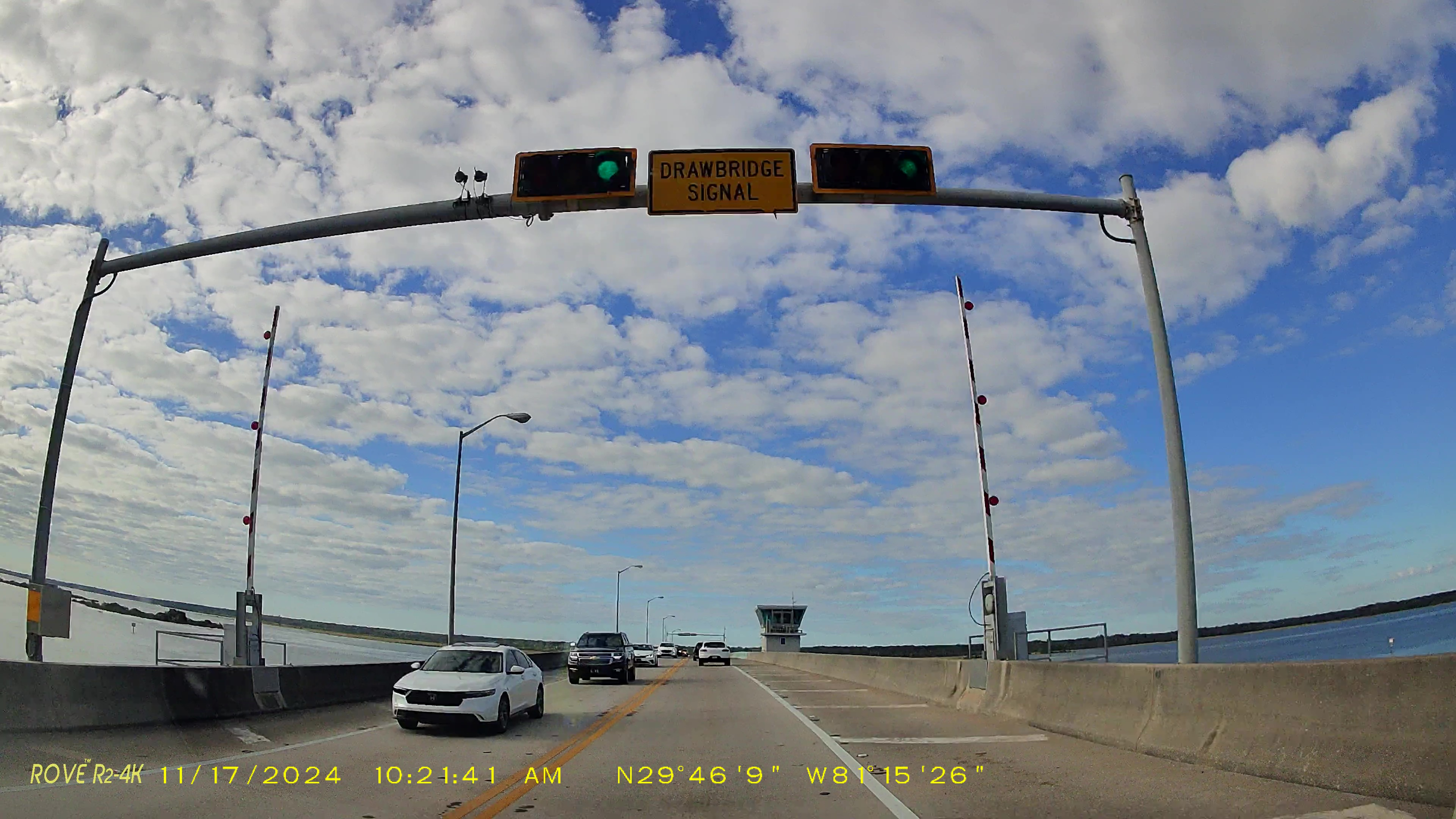
Crescent Beach Bridge

== Major intersections ==
The entire route is in St. Johns County.

Location	mi	km	Destinations	Notes
	0.000	0.000	SR 207 – Hastings, St. Augustine	Western terminus
	3.452	5.555	CR 305 north	
	8.47	13.63	I-95 (SR 9) – Jacksonville, Miami	I-95 exit 305
Dupont Center	10.621	17.093	US 1 (SR 5) – St. Augustine, Bunnell	
Crescent Beach	13.773– 14.337	22.165– 23.073	Crescent Beach Bridge over Matanzas River (Atlantic Intracoastal Waterway)	
Crescent Beach	14.485	23.311	SR A1A – Fort Matanzas, Washington Oaks State Gardens, Anastasia State Park	Eastern terminus
1.000 mi = 1.609 km; 1.000 km = 0.621 mi

== See also ==
- List of state roads in Florida
