= Florida State Road 207 =

State highway in Florida, United States

State Road 207
- Florida State Road 207 highlighted in red

Route information
- Maintained by FDOT
- Length: 24.430 mi (39.316 km)

Major junctions
- South end: US 17 / SR 100 in East Palatka
- SR 206 near Spuds; I-95 near Vermont Heights
- North end: US 1 in St. Augustine

Location
- Country: United States
- State: Florida
- Counties: Putnam, St. Johns

Highway system
- Florida State Highway System; Interstate; US; State; Former; Pre‑1945; Toll; Scenic
← SR 206	→ SR 208

State Road 207 (SR 207) is a four-lane state highway in northeast Florida, extending from US 17 in East Palatka, Florida at the southwest end to US 1 in St. Augustine, Florida at the northeastern end.

== Route description ==
State Road 207 begins at US 17 in East Palatka, and heads northeast through Putnam County, going through the community of Orange Mills. SR 207 then enters St. Johns County, passing through Hastings before intersecting SR 206 in Spuds. SR 207 continues northeast, passing through the communities of Armstrong, Elkton, and Vermont Heights before encountering an interchange with Interstate 95. From there, the road spends the rest of its journey approaching St. Augustine, slowly heading into the heart of the city, intersecting SR 312 before terminating at US 1.

SR 207 mainly goes through farming area. The Seminole Electric power plant, and the Georgia Pacific paper mill in Putnam County along the St. Johns River can be seen from the road.

Much of the road includes crossings and trailheads for the Palatka-to-St. Augustine State Trail, including a trailhead on a former segment of the road in Elkton.

== Major intersections ==
County	Location	mi	km	Destinations	Notes
Putnam	East Palatka	0.000	0.000	US 17 / SR 100 (SR 15 / SR 20) – Pomona Park, Crescent City, Palatka, Ravine State Gardens, Putnam County Fairgrounds	
Putnam		4.081	6.568	CR 207A west	
St. Johns	Hastings	7.679	12.358	CR 13 south (Main Street)	South end of CR 13 overlap
St. Johns		9.554	15.376	SR 206 east – Crescent Beach	
St. Johns	Spuds	10.777	17.344	CR 13 north – Jacksonville	North end of CR 13 overlap
St. Johns	Elkton	15.210	24.478	CR 305	
St. Johns		19.37	31.17	I-95 (SR 9) – Jacksonville, Daytona Beach, Miami	I-95 exit 311
St. Johns		23.157	37.268	SR 312 east – St. Augustine Amphitheatre, Anastasia State Park	
St. Johns	St. Augustine	24.332	39.159	CR 5A (South Dixie Highway)	
St. Johns	St. Augustine	24.430	39.316	US 1 (Ponce de Leon Boulevard / SR 5) – Historic Downtown St. Augustine, Flagler College	
1.000 mi = 1.609 km; 1.000 km = 0.621 mi: Concurrency terminus
