= Florida State Road 16 =

Highway in Florida, US

State Road 16
- SR 16 in red, related county roads in blue

Route information
- Maintained by FDOT
- Length: 63.616 mi (102.380 km)

Major junctions
- West end: SR 121 in Raiford
- US 301 in Starke; SR 23 near Penney Farms; US 17 in Green Cove Springs; I-95 near World Golf Village
- East end: US 1 Bus. in St. Augustine

Location
- Country: United States
- State: Florida
- Counties: Union, Bradford, Clay, St. Johns

Highway system
- Florida State Highway System; Interstate; US; State; Former; Pre‑1945; Toll; Scenic
← SR 15A	→ US 17

State Road 16 (SR 16) runs from northwest to southeast between Raiford and St. Augustine. It passes through the towns of Starke and Green Cove Springs in addition to providing access to Camp Blanding. Major roads and/or highways that SR 16 crosses include: US 301, SR 21, US 17, SR 13, Interstate 95 and US 1.

== Route description ==
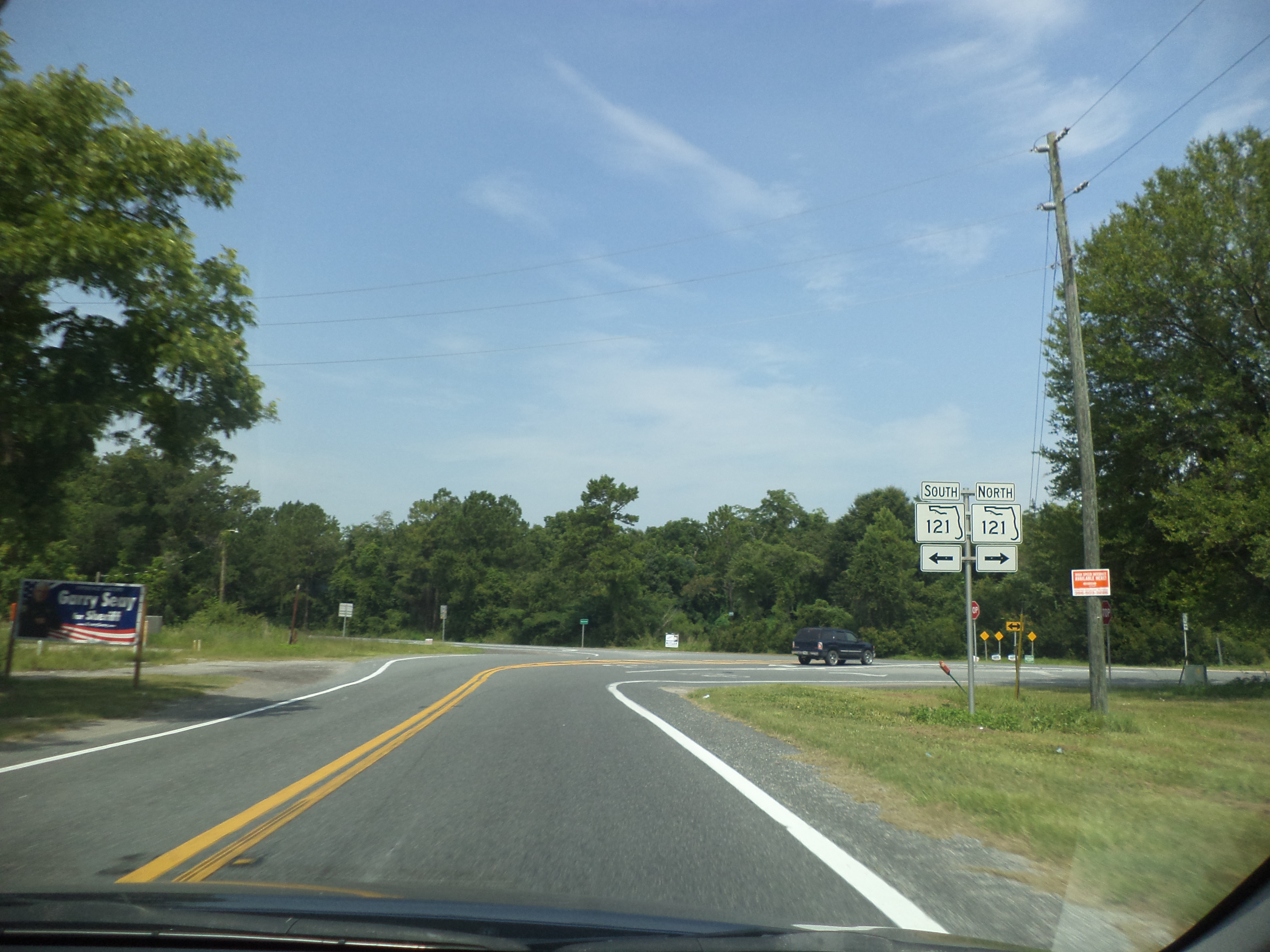
Western terminus at State Road 121 in Union County

The route begins at Florida State Road 121 in Raiford and runs straight east. After passing the Union Correctional Institute, and a furniture factory across from a forest, it curves southeast to cross a bridge over the New River, thus crossing the Union-Bradford County Line. From there it runs between the Florida State Prison and New River Correctional Institute, and remains at this general trajectory until it reaches Starke.

After passing under the diamond interchange with U.S. Route 301 Alternate (Starke Bypass), the road enters the northern edge of downtown Starke, where it encounters the intersection with CR 229 and makes a curve more towards the east before intersecting US 301. Five blocks later, it has a grade crossing with the two tracks of the CSX Wildwood Subdivision then four blocks later, curves directly east once again. Leaving the city, the road bends slightly to the northeast and later crosses the Bradford-Clay County Line where it then encounters a sharp left curve to the north at a wye intersection with the eastern terminus of SR 230, only to curve back straight east again, where it has another intersection with the southern terminus of CR 225. These sharp curves are around the northwest shores of Kingsley Lake, and then the vicinity of Camp Blanding. The southwestern terminus of CR 215 provides a shortcut towards Jacksonville, but the main road leading to that city is found later as SR 21, north of Belmore.

East of SR 21, the road passes by the historic town of Penney Farms and then runs through Pass Station before crossing a bridge over Peters Creek. At the Clay County Fairgrounds, the route has a short overlap with Clay CR 315, a tri-county road running from Marion County through Putnam County almost towards Fleming Island. In Green Cove Springs, the road crosses the CSX Sanford Subdivision and the Clay County Historical Museum, then makes a sharp turn to the south at US 17, sharing an overlap with that route until the Leonard C Taylor Parkway, where it leaves US 17 and returns to the east.

SR 16 crosses the St. Johns River using the Shands Bridge. This bridge connects Clay and St. Johns Counties. The Shands is often considered an emergency alternative to the Buckman Bridge that is farther north. The difference between both bridges is that the Buckman, which carries Interstate 295, has eight lanes while the Shands has only two lanes. The Shands Bridge is expected to be retired and replaced with a wider bridge in the future as part of the First Coast Expressway project.

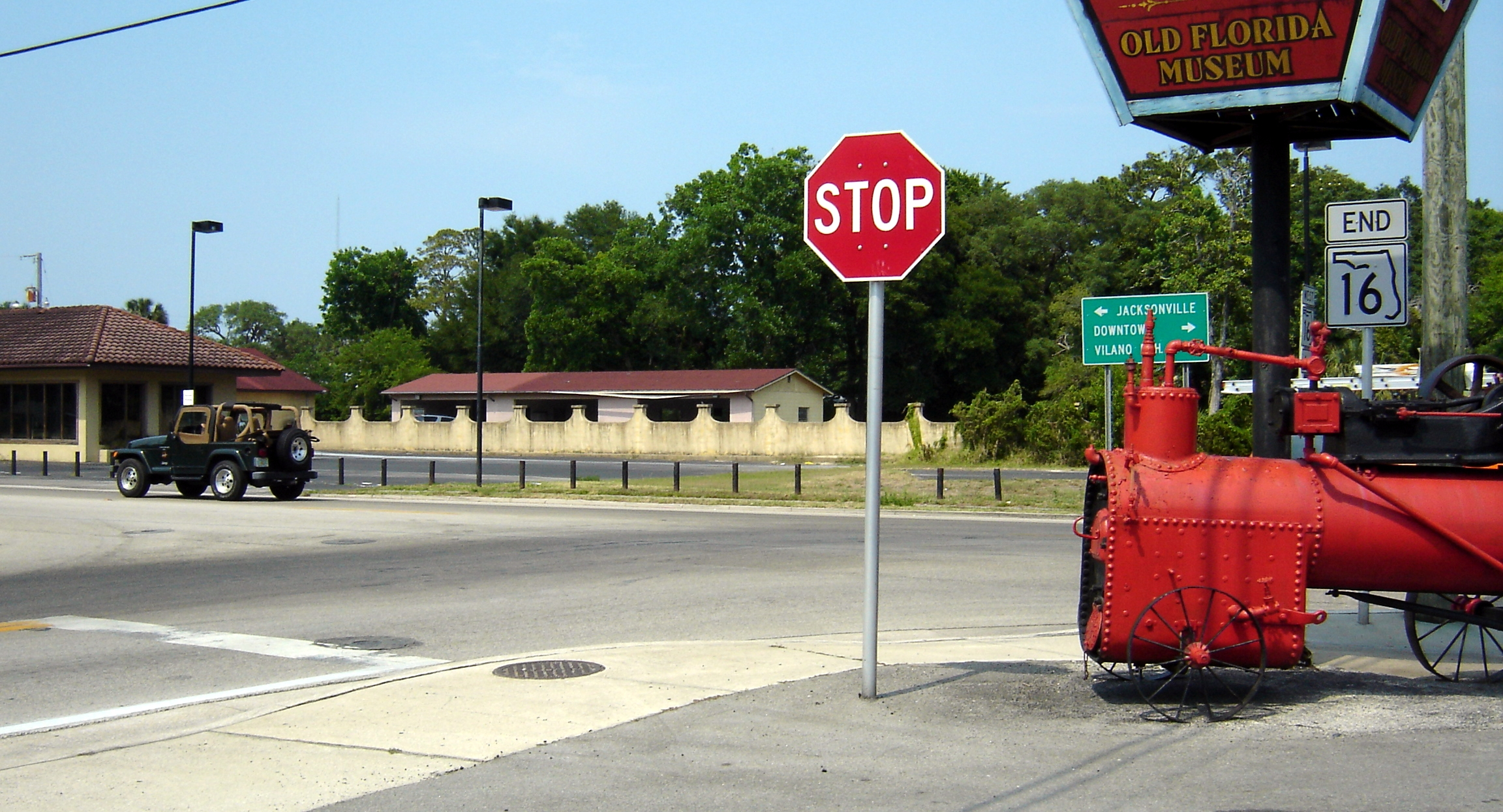
Eastern terminus at US 1 Business in St. Augustine

After the bridge, the road has a wye intersection with SR 13, and turns southbound again in another overlap. As SR 16 turns east again, Route 13 is downgraded into St. Johns County Road 13, which runs along the east bank of the St. Johns River towards Spuds, Hastings, and even as far south as the vicinity of Bunnell. SR 16's eastern trajectory ends again at the southeastern terminus of CR 16A and southern terminus of Silverlake Parkway. It curves back to the east between CR 208 and Interstate 95 at Exit 318. The last CR 16A is at Lewis Speedway before the road crosses a bridge over the San Sebastian River and enters the historic City of Saint Augustine where it crosses the main line of the Florida East Coast Railroad just before the intersection with US 1. Florida State Road 16 ends two blocks later at San Marco Avenue (US Business Route 1).

== Major intersections ==
County	Location	mi	km	Destinations	Notes
Union	Raiford	0.000	0.000	SR 121 – Lake Butler, Macclenny, Gainesville	
Union		1.460	2.350	CR 199 north	
Bradford		4.717	7.591	CR 225	
Bradford	Heilbronn	6.393	10.289	CR 229A west	
Bradford		8.239	13.259	CR 233	
Bradford	Starke	10.065	16.198	US 301 Alt. (Starke Bypass / SR 223) – Ocala, Baldwin	Interchange
Bradford	Starke	11.505	18.516	CR 229 north	
Bradford	Starke	11.789	18.973	US 301 (SR 200) to SR 100 – Lawtey, Waldo, Ocala	
Clay	Kingsley Village	17.611	28.342	SR 230 west	
Clay	Kingsley Village	18.113	29.150	Kingsley Lake Drive (CR 16A east)	
Clay		18.830	30.304	CR 225 north – Lawtey	
Clay	Kingsley Beach	19.896	32.020	Kingsley Lake Drive (CR 16A west)	
Clay		21.130	34.005	CR 215 north – Middleburg, Jacksonville	
Clay		25.817	41.548	SR 21 – Middleburg, Keystone Heights, Jacksonville, Gold Head Branch State Park	
Clay	Penney Farms	31.298	50.369	CR 218 west – Middleburg	
Clay		34.131	54.929	SR 23 (First Coast Expressway) to I-10 / US 17 – Jacksonville, Lake City, Green Cove Springs, Palatka	SR 23 exit 20
Clay		35.361	56.908	CR 315 south (Springbank Road)	west end of CR 315 overlap
Clay		35.858	57.708	CR 315 north	east end of CR 315 overlap
Clay		36.618	58.931	CR 315A north	
Clay		36.732	59.114	CR 16A east	
Clay		37.119	59.737	CR 16A east (Randall Road)	
Clay		37.368	60.138	CR 16A (Randall Road)	
Clay	Green Cove Springs	37.980	61.123	Oakridge Avenue (CR 15A south)	
Clay	Green Cove Springs	39.104	62.932	US 17 north (Orange Avenue / SR 15) – Jacksonville	west end of US 17 overlap
Clay	Green Cove Springs	39.734	63.946	US 17 south (SR 15) – Palatka	east end of US 17 overlap
St. Johns River		42.735– 43.997	68.775– 70.806	Shands Bridge	
St. Johns		45.040	72.485	SR 13 north – Jacksonville	west end of SR 13 overlap
St. Johns	Wards Creek	49.038	78.919	CR 13 south – Hastings	east end of SR 13 overlap
St. Johns		50.699	81.592	CR 16A west	
St. Johns	Mill Creek	52.213	84.029	CR 13A south (Pacetti Road) / International Golf Parkway – World Golf Village	
St. Johns		58.011	93.360	CR 208 west – St. Johns County Agricultural Center	
St. Johns		58.17	93.62	I-95 (SR 9) – Jacksonville, Daytona Beach, Miami	I-95 exit 318
St. Johns		63.118	101.579	CR 16A north (Lewis Speedway Road)	
St. Johns	St. Augustine	63.502	102.197	US 1 (Ponce de Leon Boulevard North / SR 5) – Jacksonville, Bunnell, Flagler College, St. Augustine Amphitheatre, Fort Mose State Park, Anastasia State Park, Historic Downtown St. Augustine	
St. Johns	St. Augustine	63.616	102.380	US 1 Bus. (San Marco Avenue / SR 5A) – Jacksonville, Downtown St. Augustine, Vilano Beach	
1.000 mi = 1.609 km; 1.000 km = 0.621 mi: Concurrency terminus; Unopened

== Related routes ==
=== Clay County ===
County Road 16A
- Location: Kingsley Lake
- Length: 1.508 mi (2.427 km)

CR 16A is a county road in Clay County. It is a suffixed spur of SR 16 located just west of the city of Green Cove Springs serving residences around the northwest quadrant of Kingsley Lake.

=== St. Johns County ===
County Road 16A
- Location: St. Johns
- Length: 7.350 mi (11.829 km)

CR 16A is a county road in St. Johns County, Florida. It is a spur of SR 16 in northwestern St. Johns County. It goes through mainly rural land. It begins at SR 13 just north of the Shands Bridge and continues about 1.5 miles before making a junction with County Road 210 afterwards it continues until its end at SR 16 near World Golf Village. It is the older alignment of SR 16, ending at SR 13 at the Old Shands Bridge pier.
