= Palatka-to-St. Augustine State Trail =

Rail trail in northeastern Florida, United States

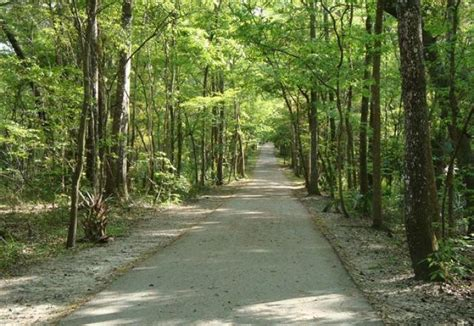
- A view of the trail

- Location within Florida Location within the United States
- Interactive map of Palatka-to-St. Augustine State Trail
- Location: Putnam and St. Johns counties, Florida, United States
- Nearest city: St. Augustine
- Coordinates: 29°43′42″N 81°29′22″W
- Established: 2001
- Visitors: 54,431 (in FY 2024–25)
- Governing body: Florida Department of Environmental Protection
- Length: 19 mi (31 km)
- Trailheads: East River Road (East Palatka); Cora C. Harrison Preserve (Hastings); Armstrong Park; Vermont Heights, Vermont Boulevard
- Use: Walking, cycling, in-line skating
- Surface: Asphalt

The Palatka-to-St. Augustine State Trail is a paved rail trail in northeastern Florida, United States, running roughly 19 miles (31 km) through Putnam and St. Johns counties along a former rail corridor mostly following parallel to State Road 207 between East Palatka and St. Augustine. The 12-foot-wide asphalt path is one of eleven state trails administered by the Florida Park Service and is a segment of the planned St. Johns River-to-Sea Loop, a five-county regional trail network.

The trail accommodates walking, cycling, and other recreational activities. The trail passes through rural pinelands and small communities including Hastings and Armstrong. The Florida State Parks Foundation reported 54,431 visitors during the 2024–25 fiscal year, with an estimated $6,516,527 in local economic impact.
