= Florida State Road 5A =

State highway in Florida, United States

State Road 5A

Route information
- Auxiliary route of SR 5
- Maintained by FDOT
- Length: 15.613 mi (25.127 km)

Major junctions
- South end: US 1 in Port Orange
- SR 400 in South Daytona; US 92 in Daytona Beach
- North end: US 1 in Ormond Beach

Location
- Country: United States
- State: Florida
- Counties: Volusia

Highway system
- Florida State Highway System; Interstate; US; State; Former; Pre‑1945; Toll; Scenic
← SR 5	→ SR 6

State Road 5A (SR 5A), also known as Nova Road, is a north–south highway that begins and ends at U.S. Highway 1 or US 1 (unsigned SR 5), in Port Orange and Ormond Beach, respectively. It is noted that when 5A was built, it was used more as a bypass or beltway, but in recent years with growth reaching far beyond SR 5A, it sees more use as a major thoroughfare that passes through the heart of the region.

== Route description ==
SR 5A begins at the intersection of US 1 (SR 5; Ridgewood Boulevard) in the Harbor Isle section of Port Orange. The road runs in close proximity to the north coast of Rose Bay until encountering the southern crossing of the Florida East Coast Railway Main Line. Beyond the intersection with Miles Drive, the road begins to curve in a more northerly direction. From there the road is almost entirely surrounded by commercial development with occasional interruptions of park and preserved land. The first major intersection with SR 5A is Florida State Road 421 (Dunlawton Avenue), which spans from I-95 at Exit 256 into the Port Orange Causeway. After the intersection with SR 421, the route is crossed by a small power line right-of-way. It is only after passing a minor street named Canal View Boulevard that SR 5A becomes flanked by the Halifax Canal, which previously flanked that road. The canal is covered over north of the intersection with Herbert Street. The northbound lanes crosses over the canal which now runs openly along the median just before the route enters South Daytona.

The first intersection in South Daytona for both lanes of SR 5A is for Walton Road, the entrance to the Lamplighter Mobile Home Park, and the entrance to Reed Canal Park, the home of the South Daytona Model Yacht Club. North of this park, the route intersects Reed Canal Road (Volusia County Road 4079). Immediately after this intersection, the route runs along the west side of the Town of Blake which is now occupied by a trailer park known as Lakeview Estates. Later it approaches a road of local importance such as Big Tree Road (CR 4072), which contains a gas station on the northeast corner surrounded by Blaine O'Neil Park. North of Rooster Road, the canal is covered over again, and the northbound lanes move over the canal, which is exposed again along the east side as the route curves slightly to the left, then to then right again just before the intersection with Florida State Road 400 (Beville Road). SR 400 spans from the I-4/I-95 interchange where it becomes a hidden state road for I-4 to US 1. Immediately after SR 400, SR 5A enters Daytona Beach.

In Daytona Beach, SR 5A continues at the same trajectory it had before crossing SR 400, but now follows the Halifax Canal at the same angle, which itself is flanked by a bikeway. Route 5A, the canal and the bikeway curve back slightly to the left just before the intersection with Carol Street. North of the intersection with South Street, SR 5A is in close proximity to the Daytona Beach Museum of Arts and Sciences and then the Cici and Hyatt Brown Museum of Art. Across from the art museum, the canal is covered over and the bikeway moves closer to the northbound lanes. The route runs along the eastern edge of Tuscawilla Park just before the intersection with Orange Avenue (CR 4050), which leads to the Veterans Memorial Bridge. Tuscawilla Park territory continues along the west side of South Nova Road for one block until the intersection with U.S. Route 92 (SR 600), otherwise known as International Speedway Boulevard. South Nova Road becomes North Nova Road north of US 92. Two signalized intersections later, the road encounters Cypress Park on the southeast corner of the intersection with George W. Engram Boulevard (Volusia CR 4040), which leads to the Main Street Bridge. The road will pass and electrical substation, and a Daytona Beach fire station before eventually encountering the intersection with the last state road in the city, specifically Florida State Road 430 which spans from Clyde Morris Boulevard to the Seabreeze Bridges.

North of Brentwood Avenue, SR 5A begins to run along the western edges of Holly Hill. The Halifax Canal is daylit again, but this time on the west side of the road. Beginning at Third Street a frontage road exists across the canal from the southbound lanes. That frontage road ends between Eighth and Tenth Streets, where the canal passes under SR 5A for the last time, as the road curves to the left and right before the intersection with 10th Street. The closest representation of a major intersection within the city is LPGA Boulevard (CR 4019). The canal is exposed again, as the route bears another curve to the left while the canal remains straight, never to flank SR 5A again. It then bears to the right between Flomich Street and Old Kings Road, replacing the alignment of the latter street.

As SR 5A leaves Holly Hill at the intersection of Alabama Avenue, North Nova Road becomes South Nova Road once again as it enters Ormond Beach. The commercial zoning remains fairly consistent with previous cities, and several signalized crossroads can be found along the way. The last major intersection with a west-to-east route is with Florida State Road 40 where South Nova Road becomes North Nova Road once again. North of there, SR 5A replaces the alignment of another local street named "Old Kings Road." Commercial development begins to dissipate north of Wilmette Avenue, replaced primarily by condominiums, as well as the Nova Community Park complex as well as the Volusia Memorial Park Cemetery. The last buildings on the west side as the road takes a notable curve to the northeast are Escondido at Tomoka Condo at the entrance to the historic but run-down Tomoka Oaks Golf and Country Club and Tomoka Oakwood North, just before it approaches the northern crossing of the Florida East Coast Railway Main Line, then developed land disappears altogether.

Florida State Road 5A seems to end at US 1 in the marshland north of Ormond Beach across from the southern reaches of Tomoka State Park, but another SR 5A exists much further north as a hidden state road for US Business Route 1 in St. Augustine.

== Major intersections ==
The entire route is in Volusia County.

Location	mi	km	Destinations	Notes
Port Orange	0.000	0.000	US 1 (South Ridgewood Avenue / SR 5)	Southern terminus
Port Orange	2.521	4.057	SR 421 (Dunlawton Avenue)	
South Daytona	6.127	9.860	SR 400 (Beville Road)	
Daytona Beach	8.192	13.184	US 92 (West International Speedway Boulevard / SR 600) – Daytona State College, Bethune-Cookman University	
Daytona Beach	9.411	15.146	SR 430 (Mason Avenue)	
Ormond Beach	14.108	22.705	SR 40 (West Granada Boulevard) to I-95	
Ormond Beach	15.613	25.127	US 1 (SR 5) – Bunnell, Ormond Beach	Northern terminus
1.000 mi = 1.609 km; 1.000 km = 0.621 mi

== History ==
=== Previous designations ===
There have been several former SR 5A in existence:

- Flagler Avenue from First Street to South Roosevelt Drive (State Road A1A) in Key West - now County Road 5A
- Krome Avenue (now State Road 997) in Florida City and North Flagler Avenue (formerly U.S. Highway 1 Business) in Homestead - the BUS US 1 designation was removed in 1969.
- Portions of West Dixie Highway and Old Federal Highway from State Road 826 in North Miami Beach to US 1 in Dania Beach - designation removed in the late 1990s, although it is still recognized on the FDOT's official map of Broward County as County Road 5A. The Florida East Coast Railroad Main Line runs between the road from the Miami-Dade-Broward County Line to the vicinity of Southwest 13th Street in Dania Beach.
- State Road 5A was also a short connector between Federal Highway (US 1) and the former State Road A1A (Southeast Dixie Highway, now County Road A1A) in Stuart. The connector is now County Road 5A.
- State Road 5A (Old Dixie Highway) was another connector between Gifford and Wabasso, that ran along the FEC Main Line, that is now County Road 5A.

=== Brevard County Road 5A ===
County Road 5A
- Location: Scottsmoor

County Road 5A (also known as Stuckway Road) is a 1-mile (1.6 km) spur route of State Road 5 (U.S. Route 1). It is the northernmost Brevard County route, and also the shortest. From Interstate 95, it provides access to Oak Hill and Scottsmoor, the northernmost town in Brevard. However, at its eastern terminus, it isn't in the town limits of Scottsmoor. Geographically, it is bounded by Volusia County to the north, and Aurantia to the south. The western terminus is with an interchange with Interstate 95 (exit 231), although Stuckway Road continues west as a dirt road. The eastern terminus is with an intersection with U.S. Route 1/State Road 5 near Scottsmoor.

=== St. Johns County Road 5A ===
County Road 5A
- Location: Saint Augustine Shores-Saint Augustine

County Road 5A is another spur route of State Road 5 (U.S. Route 1). The route also serves as a county extension of Florida State Road 5A (St. Augustine). The route begins on Old Moultrie Road at US 1 across the street from a trailer park in St. Augustine Shores briefly running westbound before curving to the north and running parallel to the main line of the and Florida East Coast Railway. Most of the surroundings start out residential but are gradually replaced by commercial development, much of which is behind shopping centers along US 1. It also runs west of the transition from St. Augustine Shores to St. Augustine South. The first major intersection is with Florida State Road 312, a short west-to-east route spanning from Florida State Road 207 to St. Augustine Beach, with a proposed northwest extension intended to lead to Florida State Road 16.

The route runs along the back of the San Lorenzo Cemetery just before the intersection with Old Dixie Highway a former segment of US 1, as well as hidden SR 5. North of that intersection, Old Moultrie Road ends and CR 5A runs along Old Dixie Highway, which was extended along Old Dixie when US 1 was relocated to a bypass in the late-1950's. The road officially enters the City Limits of Saint Augustine just south of the intersection with Arapaho Avenue, where Old Dixie Highway becomes South Dixie Highway. Shortly after this point, the route intersects Florida State Road 207. South Dixie Highway continues north of SR 207 but is unmarked. Along the way encounters a small bridge over Oyster Creek, then curves onto Pellicer Lane. The route previously continued north onto South Leonardi Avenue, which today is a partial southbound one-way street.

St. Johns County Road 5A ends at St. Johns County Road 214 (West King Street) and Pellicer Lane becomes Palmer Avenue. but historically both routes were originally state roads and 5A ran in an overlap with CR 214 towards the present intersection of US 1 (SR 5) and US Business Route 1 (SR 5A).
