= County Road 13 =

County Road 13 or County Route 13 may refer to:

- County Road 13 (Flagler County, Florida)
- County Road 13 (Orange County, Florida)
- County Road 13 (St. Johns County, Florida)
- County Road 13 (Goodhue County, Minnesota)
- County Road 13 (Hennepin County, Minnesota)
- County Road 13 (St. Louis County, Minnesota)
- County Road 13 (Washington County, Minnesota)
- County Route 13 (Monmouth County, New Jersey)
- County Route 13 (Allegany County, New York)
- County Route 13 (Chemung County, New York)
- County Route 13 (Chenango County, New York)
- County Route 13 (Columbia County, New York)
- County Route 13 (Dutchess County, New York)
- County Route 13 (Franklin County, New York)
- County Route 13 (Genesee County, New York)
- County Route 13 (Greene County, New York)
- County Route 13 (Herkimer County, New York)
- County Route 13 (Jefferson County, New York)
- County Route 13 (Lewis County, New York)
- County Route 13 (Niagara County, New York)
- County Route 13 (Oneida County, New York)
- County Route 13 (Onondaga County, New York)
- County Route 13 (Putnam County, New York)
- County Route 13 (Rockland County, New York)
- County Route 13 (Schoharie County, New York)
- County Route 13 (Schuyler County, New York)
- County Route 13 (Steuben County, New York)
- County Route 13 (Suffolk County, New York)
- County Route 13 (Sullivan County, New York)
- County Route 13 (Ulster County, New York)
