= County Route 210 =

County Route 210 or County Road 210 may refer to:

- County Road 210 (St. Johns County, Florida)
- County Route 210 (Wayne County, New York)
