= Spuds, Florida =

Community in Florida, United States

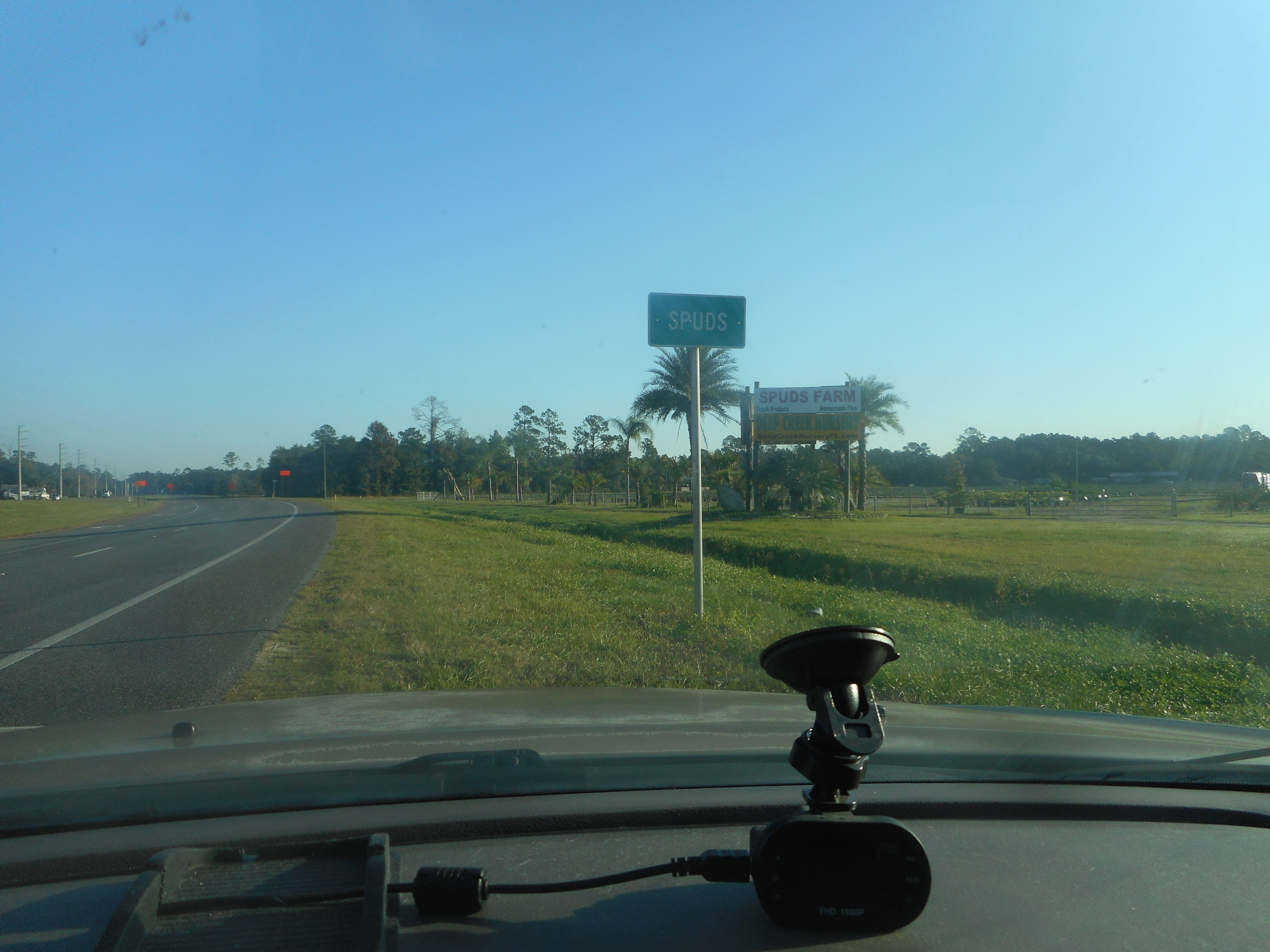
Eastbound Florida State Road 207 entering Spuds.

Spuds is an unincorporated community in St. Johns County, Florida, United States. The community is situated in a region that depends economically on potato growing and other agriculture. As well as potatoes, the land around Spuds provides gladioli. A camp for German prisoners of war was built in Spuds during World War II, close to the intersection between State Roads 206 and 207.

== Location ==
Spuds is located at 29°44′22″N 81°28′18″W (29.7394, -81.4717), near the intersection of State Road 207, which is six miles to the south-west leads to Hastings and 25 miles to the north-east leads to St. Augustine, and County Road 13, which eventually leads to Jacksonville, 50 miles to the north. A Florida East Coast Railway line formerly ran through Spuds from St. Augustine to Palatka, with a stop also called Spuds. Today this line is part of the Palatka-to-St. Augustine State Trail.
