= Anastasia Island =

Barrier island off the coast of Florida, United States

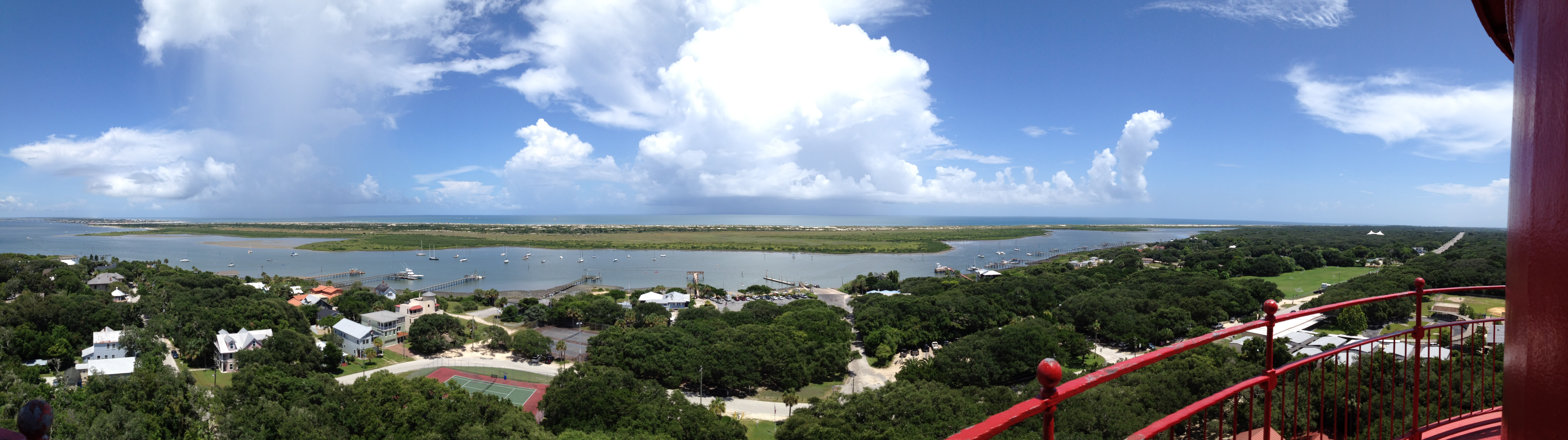
- View of Anastasia Island from St. Augustine Lighthouse.

- Anastasia Island Anastasia Island (North Atlantic)

Geography
- Location: North Atlantic
- Coordinates: 29.80406°N 81.26692°W

Administration
- United States
- State: Florida
- County: St. Johns

Anastasia Island is a barrier island located off the northeast Atlantic coast of Florida in the United States. It sits east of St. Augustine, running north–south in a slightly southeastern direction to Matanzas Inlet. The island is about 14 miles (23 km) long and an average of 1 mile in width. It is separated from the mainland by the Matanzas River, part of the Intracoastal waterway. Matanzas Bay, the body of water between the island and downtown St. Augustine, opens into St. Augustine Inlet.

Part of the island (the Davis Shores and Lighthouse Park neighborhoods) is within St. Augustine city limits, while other communities on the island include St. Augustine Beach, Coquina Gables, Butler Beach, Crescent Beach, and Treasure Beach.

Fort Matanzas National Monument, a Spanish colonial-era fort built in 1740–1742, is located at the southern end of the island on Rattlesnake Island in the Intracoastal waterway within the park boundaries; it was designed to protect St. Augustine from attack via the Matanzas River.

== History ==
Juan Ponce de León may have landed on the barrier island in 1513. Spanish Admiral Pedro Menéndez de Avilés, founder of St. Augustine, moved his initial settlement to Anastasia Island after a revolt by the Timucuan Indians in 1566. This settlement was short-lived, and the colonists moved back to the mainland at the site of present-day downtown St. Augustine.

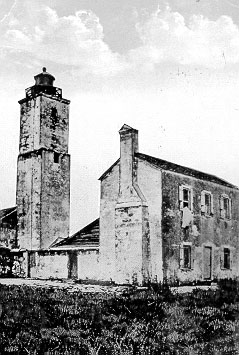
Original Anastasia Island lighthouse, now destroyed. Lower parts of the coquina tower dated to the First Spanish Period.

The Spanish built a wooden watch-tower on the northern end of Anastasia Island to warn the town of approaching vessels by raising signal flags. It was sighted by Sir Francis Drake in 1586; consequently he came ashore and attacked the city. The Spanish eventually replaced the tower with a coquina structure that was converted into a lighthouse soon after Florida came into the possession of the United States in 1821. This was replaced by the present-day St. Augustine Light in 1874. The original lighthouse collapsed in 1880 due to beach erosion and the encroachment of the sea. The earliest built residence on Anastasia Island still standing is the lighthouse keepers' house built in 1876 next to the present lighthouse. Several other houses in the Lighthouse Park neighborhood date to the 1880s.

The island was part of a 10,000-acre land grant from the Spanish crown to the land dealer Jesse Fish, who established a plantation, El Vergel (The Orchard), and built his home there in 1763. Fish planted orange groves on the property which produced fruit known as far away as London for its juiciness and sweetness. His production increased annually until 1776, when he shipped a total of 65,000 oranges from Florida.

In 1792, Jesse Fish's son, Jesse Fish, Jr., purchased the tract, amounting to the whole of "St. Anastasia" island except certain lands marked off by officials as reserved, such as the King's Quarry. Sarah Fish, Jesse Fish, Jr.'s wife and heir, filed a claim that was reported to Congress in 1826 as valid by the commissioners for East Florida and the Secretary of State of the United States, and subsequently confirmed by an act of Congress on May 23, 1828.

In 1896, two boys found an oddly shaped carcass on the beach, named the St. Augustine Monster. Long suspected to be the remains of some form of gigantic octopus and gaining the interest of cryptozoologists, analysis from 1995 and 2004 concluded it to be whale blubber.

The land developer David Paul Davis, known as "D. P." or "Doc", a native of Green Cove Springs, developed the Davis Shores neighborhood at the north end of Anastasia Island during the land boom of the mid–1920s. In 1925–1926 he filled in the extensive salt marshes located directly opposite the center of St. Augustine across the Matanzas River. As the construction bubble collapsed and real estate values plummeted, D.P. Davis mysteriously disappeared at sea on October 12, 1926. Construction of the Bridge of Lions had begun in 1925 to provide access to his projected development and was completed in 1927. A rehabilitation and partial replacement of the Bridge of Lions, as well as restoration of its two Medici lions statues began in 2006 and was completed in 2010. During World War II the Coast Guard occupied the lighthouse, and other residences in Davis Shores were used as barracks for soldiers.

Beneath the sandy soil of most of the island lie layers of coquina, a shelly rock in various stages of consolidation. This rock is composed primarily of whole and fragmented shells of the donax, or coquina, clam admixed occasionally with scattered fossils of various marine vertebrates, including sharks' and rays' teeth. This deposition is known as the Anastasia Formation, and was formed during the Late Pleistocene epoch, in the period of successive glacial ages from about 110,000 years to 11,700 years ago. It is the only local natural source of stone, and was quarried by the Spanish and later the British to construct many of the buildings in St. Augustine (including the Castillo de San Marcos). An old well and chimney made of coquina rock, located on Old Beach Road, are all that remain of the Spanish barracks built to house the workers who mined the coquina for construction of the fort. These included quarry overseers, masons, and stonecutters. The years-long project (1672-1695) was accomplished with the help of Native American forced labor and African slaves.

== Parks ==
In addition to Fort Matanzas National Monument, Anastasia island is also home to the 1,600-acre (6.5 km^{2}), Anastasia State Park.

== See also ==
- Anastasia State Park
- St. Augustine Light
- St. Augustine Bridge Company
