= Clay County Historical Museum =

Museum in Florida, United States

Coordinates: 29°59′29″N 81°41′05″W

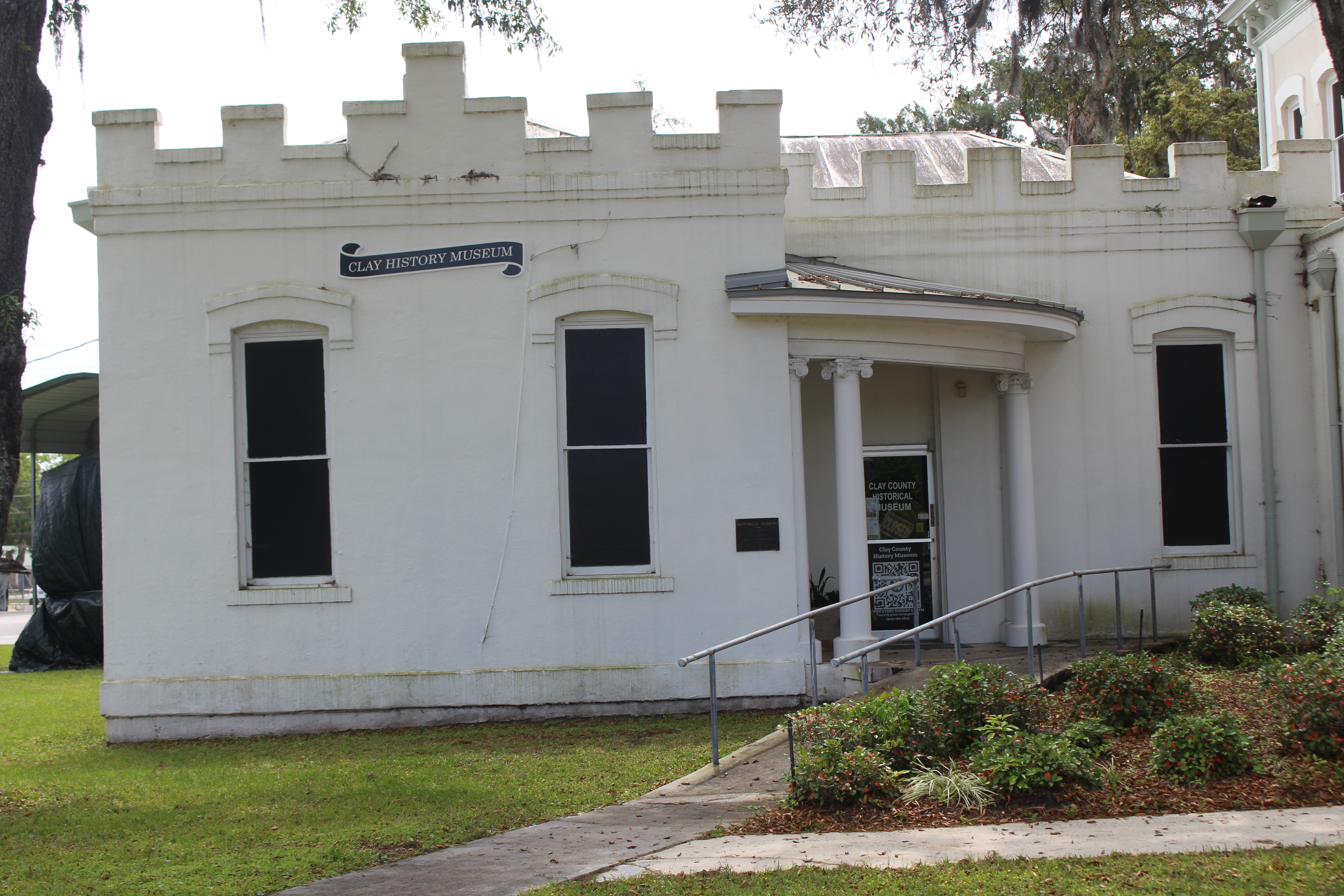
Clay Historical Museum

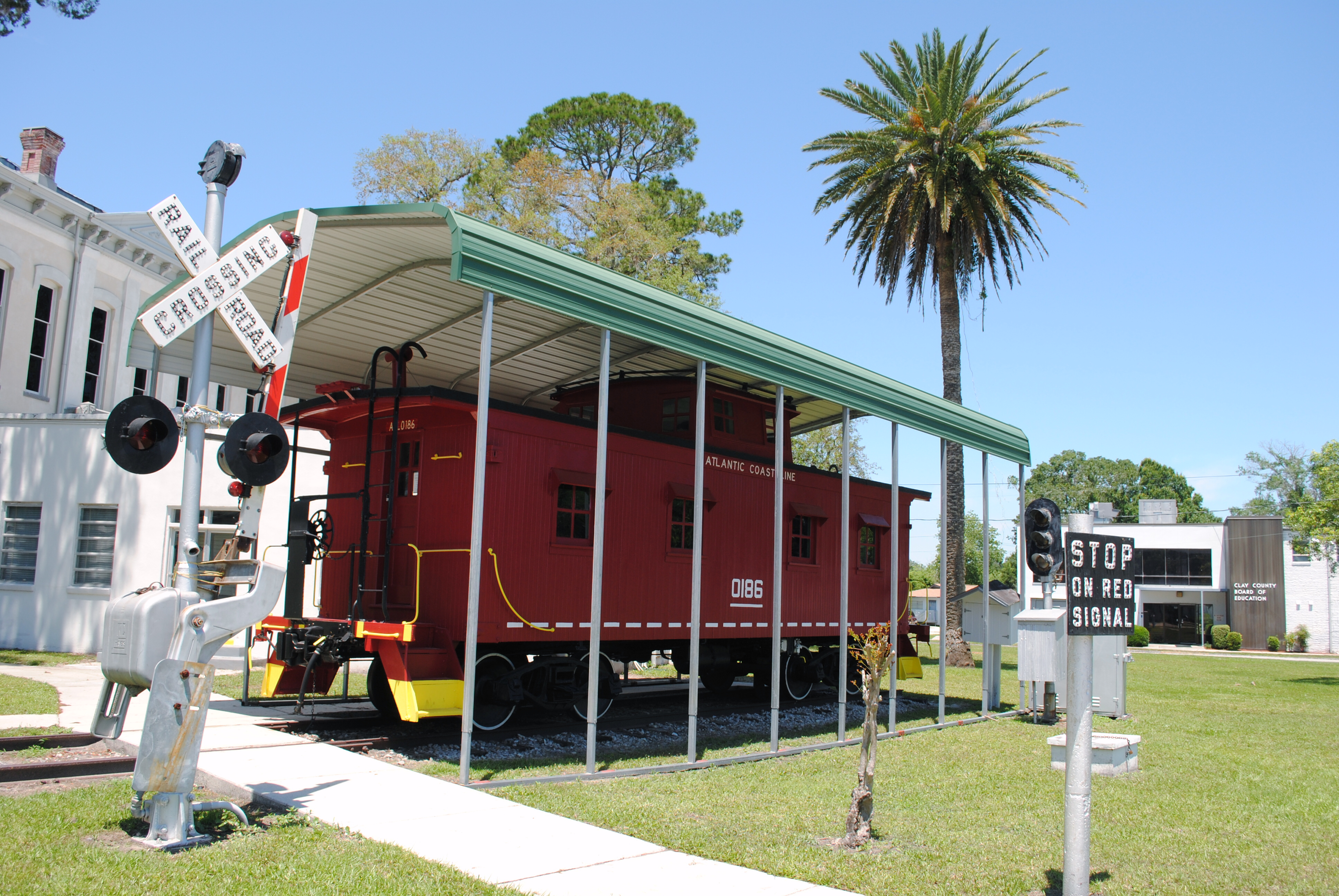
Caboose at the Clay County Historical Museum

The Clay County Historical Society Museum is located in Green Cove Springs, Clay County, Florida. It is located in the 1890 Courthouse Annex. Exhibits include a country kitchen, a music room, doll room, vault, climb aboard wooden caboose, fully equipped railroad transfer station and a country store. It is operated by volunteers of the Clay County Historical Society. The museum is located at 915 Walnut Street in the Clay County Historical Triangle which also includes the 1894 county jail and 1890 courthouse between Walnut Street and Ferris Street (Hwy 16).

== Website ==
- Clay County Historical Society
- website
