= St. Augustine Bridge Company =

Company in Florida, US

The St. Augustine Bridge Company was incorporated in Florida in 1892. It was established for the purpose of constructing, maintaining and operating a toll bridge between the city of St. Augustine and Anastasia Island.

It was incorporated on May 16, 1892, by O. B. Smith, M. S. Carter, Mathew Hays, Allen Wood and W. W. Dewhurst. Florida state law chapter 4279, approved June 2, 1893, extended the powers of the company to include issuing bonds, and required the bridge to be a drawbridge.

The toll was not to exceed five cents per pedestrian, 25 cents for one-horse vehicles, 50 cents for two-horse vehicles, and other reasonable rates for other classes.

The corporation would dissolve after 99 years.
