= Matanzas Bay =

Coordinates: 29.9071°N 81.2976°W

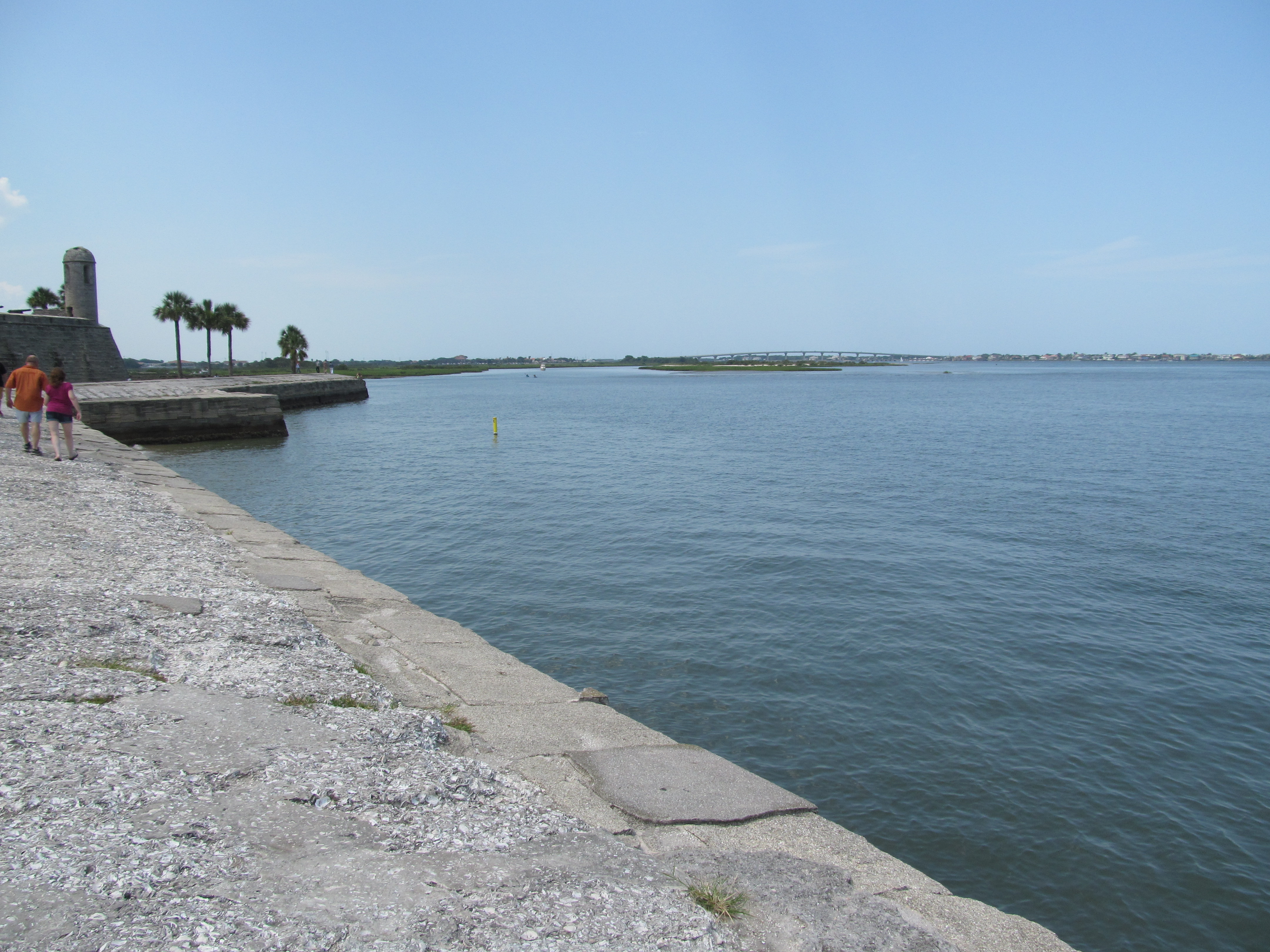
View of the Matanzas Bay from the Castillo de San Marcos

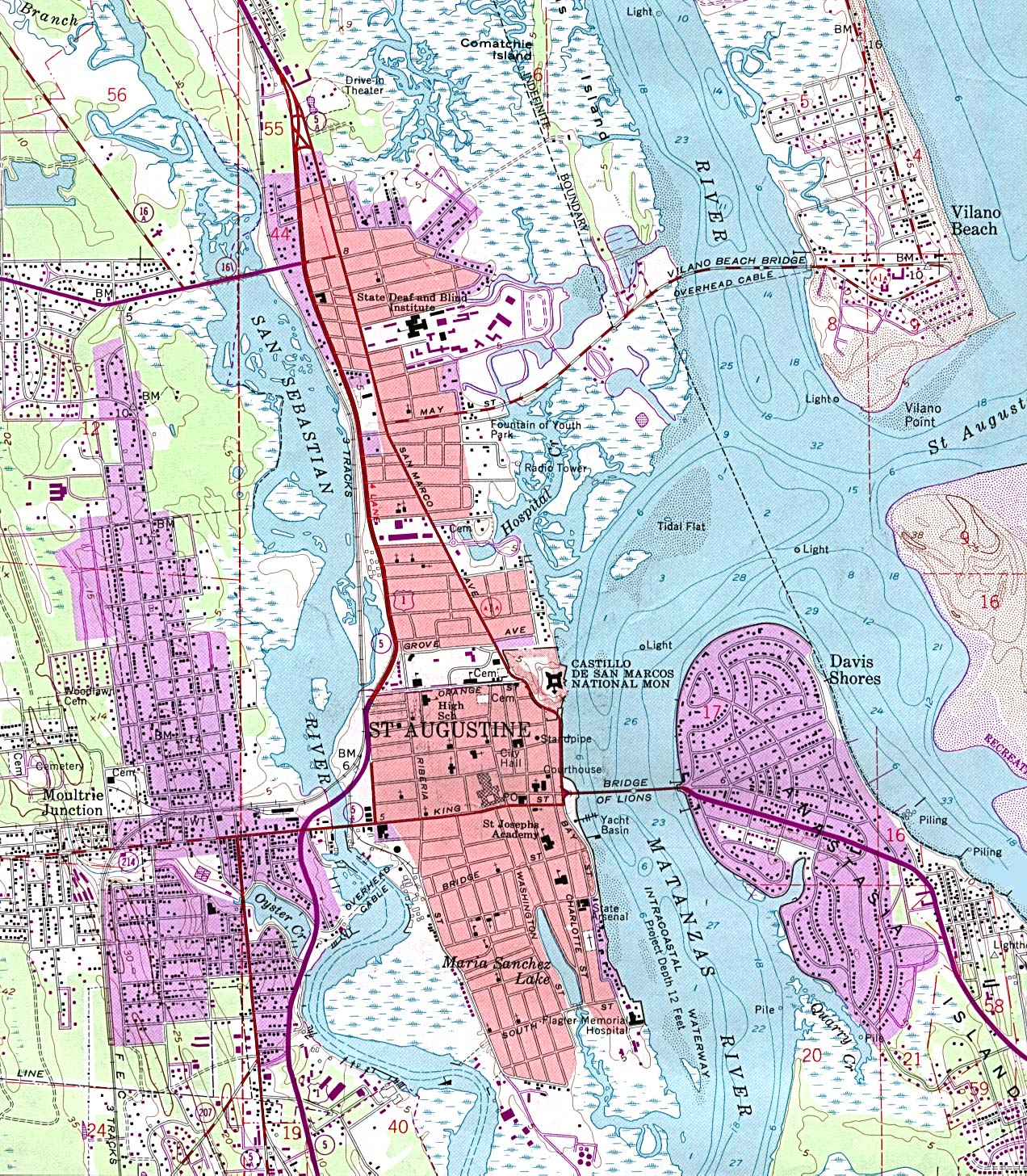
United States Topographical Map of St. Augustine, Florida

Matanzas Bay is a saltwater bay in St. Johns County, Florida; the entrance to the bay from the South Atlantic is via St. Augustine inlet. Technically this stretch of water running along the city's waterfront is part of the Matanzas River, though it is regularly referred to as a bay or harbor. Bodies of water that connect to the bay in addition to the South Atlantic are clockwise from the inlet:

- Salt Run: an inlet of Anastasia Island creating a peninsula of the eastern portion of Anastasia State Park.
- Matanzas River: a tidal channel; part of the Intracoastal Waterway which flows in an easterly direction then south for approximately 15 miles, separating Anastasia Island from the mainland. Another tidal channel the San Sebastian River flows westerly from the Matanzas River creating a peninsula of the original Spanish era section of St. Augustine.
- Hospital Creek: tidal channel flowing north from confluence of Matanzas Bay and North River. Creek in which Pedro Menéndez de Avilés sailed into and initially established St. Augustine on its mainland shore.
- Tolomato River (also known locally and historically in the British period as the North River): tidal channel flowing north
- Municipalities: St. Augustine and Vilano Beach.
- Tides: The average fall of the tides in Matanzas Bay is 4.5 feet between high and low tide.
- Bridges: State road A1A crosses the bay via the Bridge of Lions which connects the mainland portion of St. Augustine with the portion of the city located on Anastasia Island.
- Wetlands: A large portion of the tidal wetlands directly fronting the bay have been obliterated due to construction of the seawall in the old quarter of St. Augustine and the construction of Davis Shores a residential development created on reclaimed land on Anastasia Island and a subsequent seawall. The portions of the Intracoastal Waterway connected to Matanzas Bay have wetlands of varying amounts and degrees of natural state.
- Parks: Castillo de San Marcos National Monument, Spanish era fort completed in 1675 and Anastasia State Park.
