= Florida State Road 13 =

Highway in Florida, US

State Road 13
- SR 13 in red, unsigned Jacksonville segment in grey, related county roads in blue

Route information
- Maintained by FDOT
- Length: 32.288 mi (51.962 km)
- Existed: 1945 renumbering (definition)–present

Major junctions
- South end: SR 16 / CR 13 near Green Cove Springs
- I-295 in Jacksonville; US 1 / US 90 / SR 5 in Jacksonville
- North end: Downtown Jacksonville

Location
- Country: United States
- State: Florida
- Counties: St. Johns, Duval

Highway system
- Florida State Highway System; Interstate; US; State; Former; Pre‑1945; Toll; Scenic
← SR 12	→ SR 14

State Road 13 (SR 13) is a 28.25-mile-long (45.46 km) state highway in the U.S. state of Florida, running north from SR 16 near Green Cove Springs, through Switzerland to Jacksonville on the east shore of the St. Johns River.

== Route description ==
Its southern terminus is with SR 16 and County Road 13 (CR 13) near Green Cove Springs. CR 13 continues south to Hastings and then southeast, along old Dixie Highway to U.S. Route 1 (US 1, unsigned SR 5) near Bunnell.

SR 13 is known as San Jose Boulevard for much of its run through Duval County (coextensive with the city limits of Jacksonville). As it approaches Downtown Jacksonville, it becomes Hendricks Avenue, then turns west along Prudential Drive and then turns into San Marco Boulevard before crossing the St. Johns River at the Acosta Bridge. The road ends at an interchange with Riverside Avenue (former US 17).

A portion of the route that runs along the east bank of the St. Johns River, south of Jacksonville, is designated the William Bartram Scenic and Historic Highway.

== Major intersections ==
County	Location	mi	km	Destinations	Notes
St. Johns	Wards Creek	0.000	0.000	SR 16 east / CR 13 south to I-95 – St. Augustine, Hastings	south end of SR 16 overlap
St. Johns		3.998	6.434	SR 16 west to US 17 – Green Cove Springs	north end of SR 16 overlap
St. Johns	Orangedale	5.356	8.620	CR 16A east / CR 210 east – St. Augustine	
St. Johns	Fruit Cove	16.303	26.237	Race Track Road / Fruit Cove Road	
Duval	Jacksonville	20.66	33.25	I-295 (SR 9A) – St. Augustine, Orange Park	Exit 5 on I-295
Duval	Jacksonville	22.488	36.191	Sunbeam Road	former SR 116
Duval	Jacksonville	23.307	37.509	SR 152 east (Baymeadows Road)	Western terminus of SR 152
Duval	Jacksonville	26.990	43.436	SR 109 east (University Boulevard)	Western terminus of SR 109
Duval	Jacksonville	28.676	46.150	SR 126 east (Emerson Street)	Western terminus of SR 126
Duval	Jacksonville	30.056	48.370	To I-95 north / San Marco Boulevard	
Duval	Jacksonville	30.198	48.599	Atlantic Boulevard	
Duval	Jacksonville	30.818	49.597	Gary Street	ramp from US 1 south / US 90 east
Duval	Jacksonville	31.003	49.894	US 1 south / US 90 east (Prudential Drive / SR 5 south)	south end of US 1 / US 90 / SR 5 / overlap
Duval	Jacksonville	31.28	50.34	US 1 north / US 90 west (Main Street / SR 5 north / SR 10 west) to I-95 south (SR 10 east)	interchange; north end of US 1 / US 90 / SR 5 overlap
Duval	Jacksonville	31.367	50.480	To I-95 / US 1 south / US 90 east / I-10 west / San Marco Boulevard – Beaches	interchange; access to Baptist Medical Center and Wolfson Children's Hospital
Duval	Jacksonville	31.8	51.2	Acosta Bridge over St. Johns River	
Duval	Jacksonville	32.288	51.962	To I-95 / Riverside Avenue / Broad Street / Water Street – Convention Center	interchange; former US 17 / SR 15 / SR 228
1.000 mi = 1.609 km; 1.000 km = 0.621 mi: Concurrency terminus

== Related roads ==
=== County Road 13 ===
County Road 13
- Location: Bunnell – Wards Creek
- Length: 49.1 mi (79.0 km)

County Road 13 (CR 13) is a road in western St. Johns County, Florida that runs from its southern terminus of US 1 near Bunnell in Flagler County, Florida, traveling northwest along Old Dixie Highway until it reaches Hastings. This includes a gap in the route exists between CR 205 in Espanola and CR 204 in St Johns County, much of which is a dirt road. North of Hastings, it travels along an overlap with Florida State Road 207 until it reaches Spuds, then branches off to the north running along the east bank of the St. Johns River until it reaches its northern terminus at SR 13 and SR 16.

=== County Road 13A ===
County Road 13A
- Location: St. Johns County
- Length: 21.3 mi (34.3 km)

County Road 13A (CR 13A) is a 14.2-mile-long (22.9 km) spur route in St. Johns County.

=== County Road 13B ===
County Road 13B
- Location: Fruit Cove
- Length: 2.381 mi (3.832 km)

County Road 13B (CR 13B) is a county-suffixed local route on the west side of SR 13, named Fruit Cove Road in Fruit Cove.
