= Armstrong, Florida =

Unincorporated community in Florida, U.S.

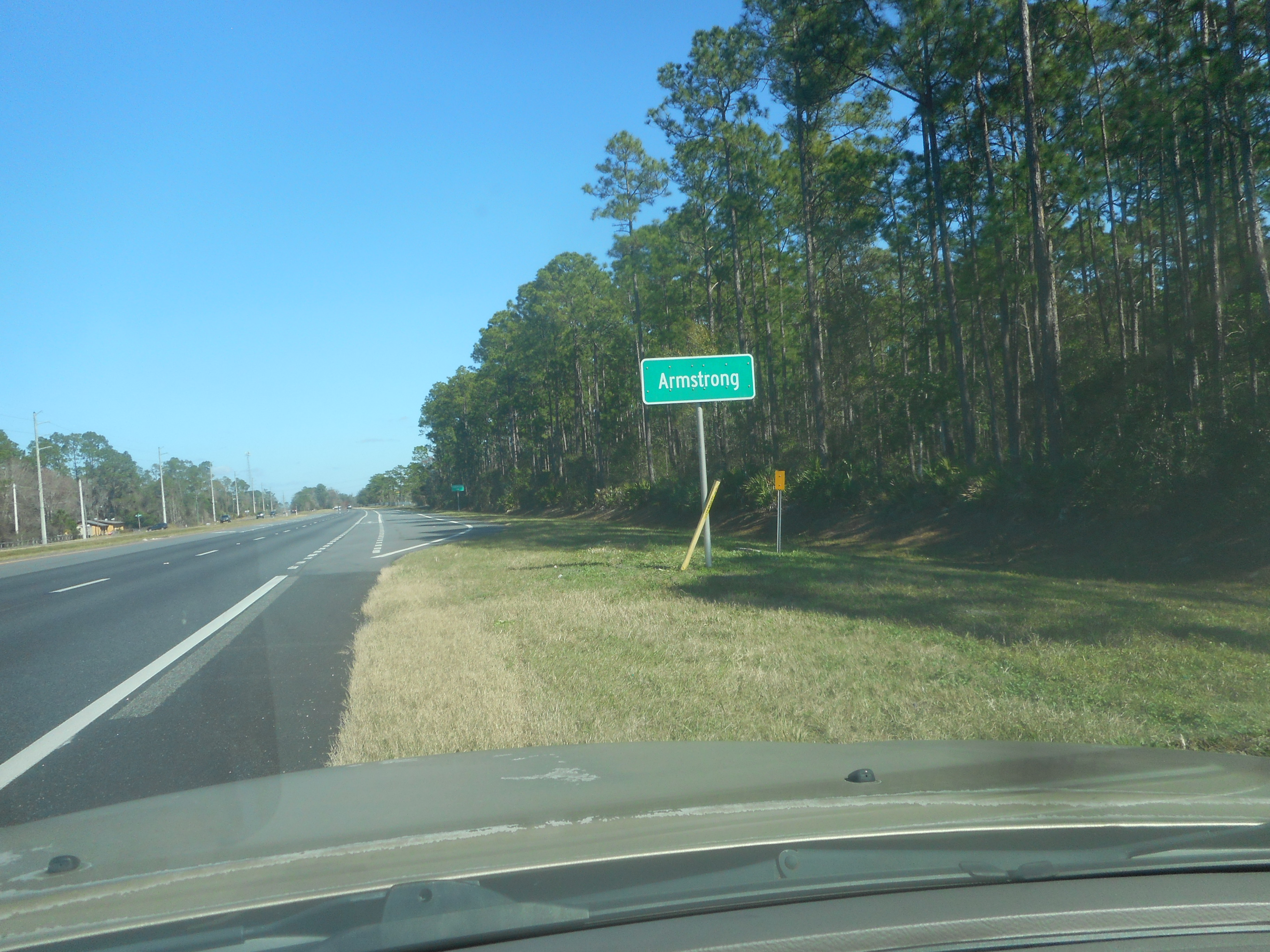
Eastbound Florida State Road 207 enters Armstrong.

Armstrong is an unincorporated community in St. Johns County, Florida, United States, located off State Road 207. It was established in 1886 and became an African American community along a rail line. Potatoes and turpentine were among the products produced commercially in the area.

Armstrong is the location of the Saint Johns County Fairgrounds, though the fairgrounds lists their address as being in nearby Elkton.

== Geography ==
Armstrong is located at 29°45′43″N 81°26′53″W.
