= Florida State Road 312 =

State highway in Florida, United States

State Road 312

Route information
- Maintained by FDOT
- Length: 3.836 mi (6.173 km)

Major junctions
- West end: SR 207 near St. Augustine
- US 1 near St. Augustine; SR A1A in St. Augustine
- East end: CR A1A in St. Augustine

Location
- Country: United States
- State: Florida
- Counties: St. Johns

Highway system
- Florida State Highway System; Interstate; US; State; Former; Pre‑1945; Toll; Scenic
← US 301	→ US 319

State Road 312 (SR 312) is a 3.8-mile-long (6.1 km) state highway serving St. Augustine, Florida in the United States. Its western terminus is at SR 207, and its eastern terminus is at County Road A1A (CR A1A) near St. Augustine Beach.

== Route description ==
State Road 312 begins at the intersection between SR 207 and SR 312, where SR 207 continues northeast into central St. Augustine. About 0.4 miles (0.64 km) east of the western terminus, SR 312 passes over the Florida East Coast Railway main line via an overpass. one mile (1.6 km) from the western terminus, SR 312 intersects U.S. Route 1 (US 1), with SR 312 continuing a few blocks east through St. Augustine until the Mickler-O'Connell Bridge over the Intracoastal Waterway. At the waterway, SR 312 enters St. Augustine city limits, where it intersects SR A1A. Continuing east, the state highway ends at the point CR A1A transitions to the roadway to continue heading east.

== Major intersections ==
The entire route is in St. Johns County.

Location	mi	km	Destinations	Notes
	0.000	0.000	SR 207 to I-95	Western terminus
	0.801	1.289	Old Moultrie Road (CR 5A)	
	1.009	1.624	US 1 (Ponce de Leon Boulevard / SR 5) – St. Augustine, Bunnell	
St. Augustine	1.556– 2.233	2.504– 3.594	Mickler-O'Connell Bridge over Matanzas River (Atlantic Intracoastal Waterway)	
St. Augustine	3.603	5.798	SR A1A – Business district	Eastern signed terminus
	3.788– 3.836	6.096– 6.173	CR A1A (A1A Beach Boulevard) – St. Augustine Beach, St. Augustine Amphitheatre	
1.000 mi = 1.609 km; 1.000 km = 0.621 mi
