= Vermont Heights, Florida =

Unincorporated community in Florida, U.S.

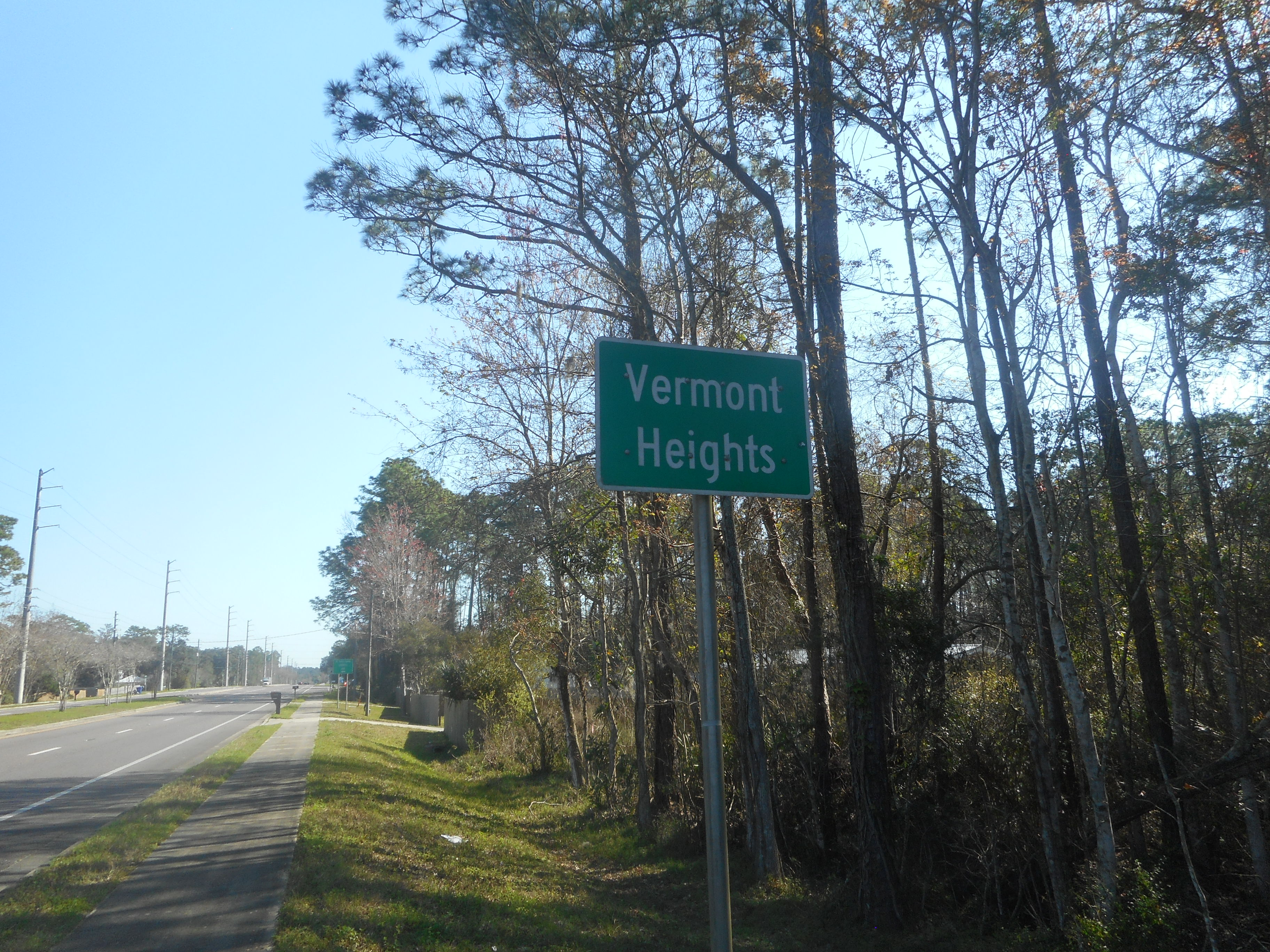
Eastbound Florida State Road 207 enters Vermont Heights, as seen from the sidewalk.

Vermont Heights is an unincorporated community in St. Johns County, Florida, United States. It is located on State Road 207, west of I-95.

== Geography ==
Vermont Heights is located at 29°48′36″N 81°23′50″W (29.81, -81.3972), at an elevation of 46 feet (14 m). Vermont Heights is the location of the Coquina Crossing Mobile Home Park and St. Augustine Community School of Performing Arts, both of which give their addresses as being in Elkton to the southwest.

A Florida East Coast Railway line formerly ran through Vermont Heights from St. Augustine to Palatka, and included a station. Today this line is part of the Palatka-to-St. Augustine State Trail, and two trailheads exist within the community.
