= Elkton, Florida =

Unincorporated community in Florida, U.S.

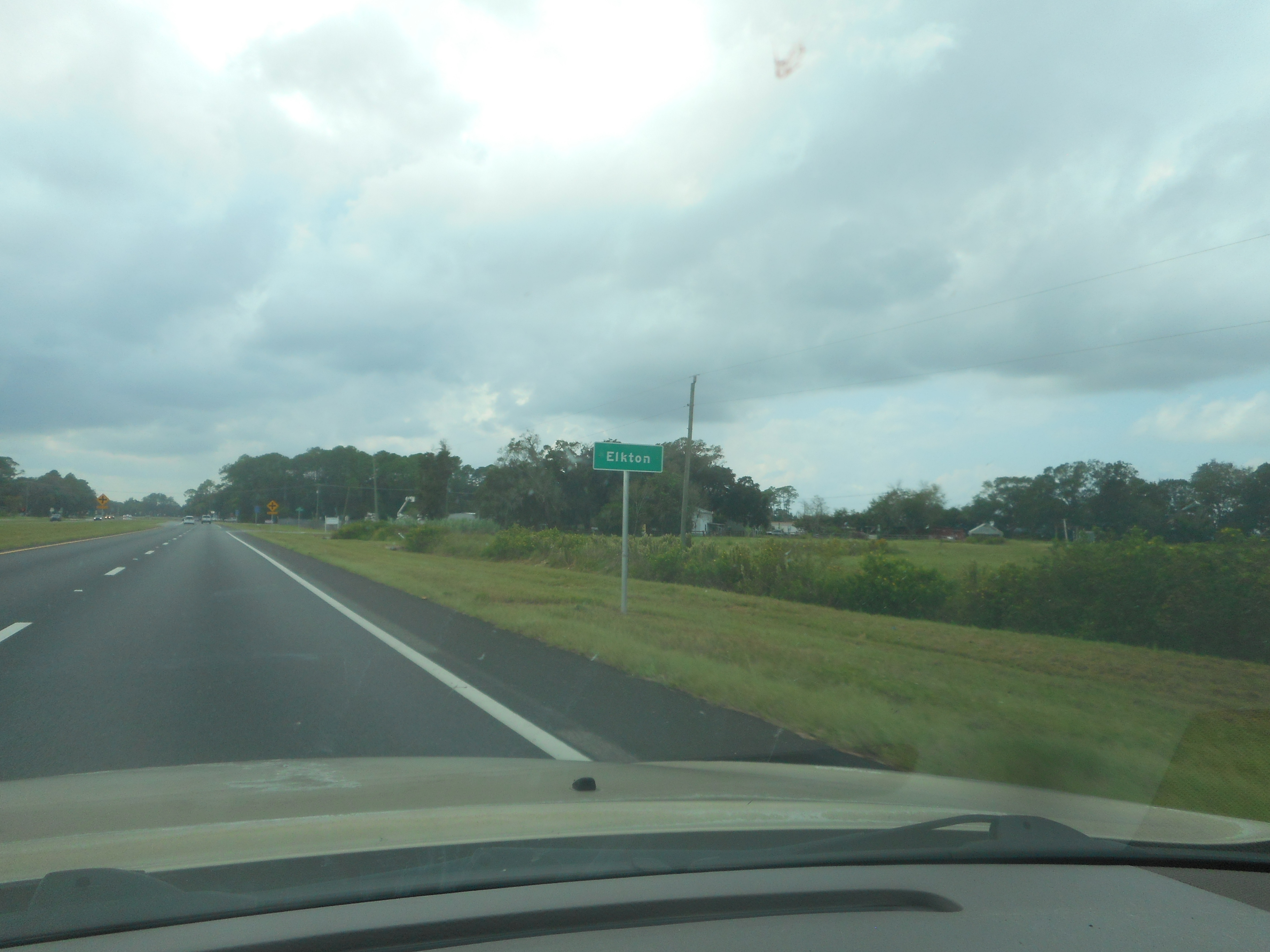
Westbound Florida State Road 207 as it enters Elkton

Elkton is an unincorporated community in St. Johns County, Florida, United States. It is located at the intersection of State Road 207 and County Road 305. The most prominent landmark is the Post Office, which delivers mail to the rural southwest section of the county.

== Geography ==
Elkton is located at 29°46′45″N 81°26′12″W.
