= List of county roads in St. Johns County, Florida =

- County road shields used in Florida

Highway names
- Interstates: Interstate X (I-X)
- US Highways: U.S. Highway X (US X)
- State: State Road X (SR X)
- County: County Road X (CR-X)

System links
- County roads in Florida; County roads in St. Johns County

The following is a list of county roads in St. Johns County, Florida. All county roads are maintained by the county in which they reside.

== County roads in St. Johns County ==
Number	Road Name(s)	From	To	Notes
CR A1A	A1A Beach Boulevard	SR A1A	SR A1A / SR 312	former SR A1A (current SR A1A here was SR 3)
CR 5A	Old Moultrie Road; South Dixie Highway	US 1	SR 207	former SR 5A; Once included King Street east of South Leonard Street.
CR 13		CR 204 and Old Brick Road SR 207	SR 207 SR 13 / SR 16	former SR 13; SR 207 splits CR 13 in two.
CR 13A	Tocoi Road and Pacetti Road	CR 13	SR 16 and International Golf Parkway	former SR 13A
CR 13B	Fruit Cove Road	SR 13	SR 13 and Race Track Road	former SR 13B
CR 16A		SR 13	SR 16	former SR 16 (current SR 16 was SR 16A)
CR 16A	Lewis Speedway	SR 16	US 1	former SR 16A inventoried by FDOT as CR 1333, but signed as CR 16A
CR 203		SR A1A	St. Johns–Duval county line	former SR 203
CR 204		CR 13 and Old Brick Road	US 1 near I-95 (exit 298)	former SR 204
CR 208		CR 13	SR 16 near I-95 (exit 318)	former SR 208
CR 210	Nocatee Parkway, Palm Valley Road	CR 16A SR A1A	SR A1A CR 203 (Ponte Vedra Boulevard)	former SR 210; western segment cuts across southeastern corner of Duval County
CR 210A	Roscoe Boulevard, Solana Road	CR 210 (Palm Valley Road)	SR A1A	former SR 210A
CR 214	King Street	CR 13	US 1 / US 1 Bus.	former SR 214, as well as the Tocoi Branch of the Florida East Coast Railway
CR 223	Veterans Parkway	CR 244 (Longleaf Pine Parkway)	Race Track Road and Linde Avenue	
CR 244	Longleaf Pine Parkway	CR 16A / CR 210	CR 2209 (St. Johns Parkway)	
CR 305	St. Amrose Church Road	CR 13	SR 206	former SR 305
CR 2209	St. Johns Parkway	Johns Creek Parkway (proposed south to CR 208)	Race Track Road	
