= East Palatka, Florida =

- CDP
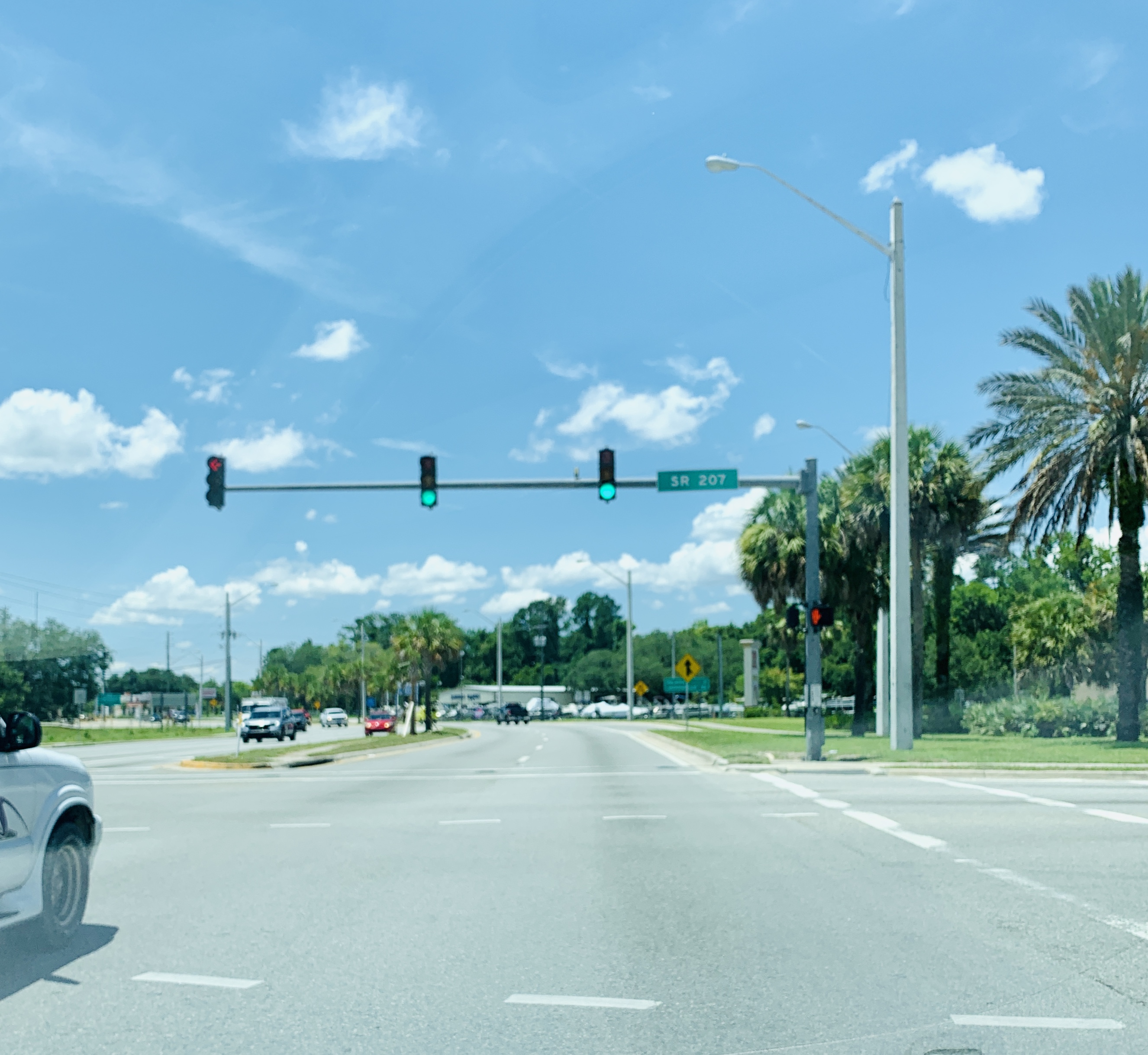
- Intersection of U.S. Route 17/State Road 20/State Road 100 and the southwestern terminus of State Road 207

- Location in Putnam County and the state of Florida
- Coordinates: 29°38′49″N 81°36′42″W
- Country: United States
- State: Florida
- County: Putnam

Area
  - Total: 4.71 sq mi (12.20 km^{2})
  - Land: 3.18 sq mi (8.24 km^{2})
  - Water: 1.53 sq mi (3.97 km^{2})
- Elevation: 16 ft (4.9 m)

Population (2020)
  - Total: 1,573
  - Density: 494.7/sq mi (191.01/km^{2})
- Time zone: UTC-5 (Eastern (EST))
  - Summer (DST): UTC-4 (EDT)
- ZIP code: 32131
- Area code: 386
- FIPS code: 12-19350
- GNIS feature ID: 2402433

East Palatka is a census-designated place (CDP) in Putnam County, Florida, United States. It is located east of the City of Palatka at the intersection of U.S. Route 17/State Road 20/State Road 100 and the southwestern terminus of State Road 207. The population was 1,573 at the 2020 census, down from 1,654 at the 2010 census. It is part of the Palatka, Florida Micropolitan Statistical Area.

East Palatka is home to the Palatka State Farmer's Market, as well as the Putnam County Fairgrounds.

== Geography ==
According to the United States Census Bureau, the CDP has a total area of 4.5 square miles (12 km^{2}), of which 3.2 square miles (8.3 km^{2}) is land and 1.3 square miles (3.4 km^{2}) (28.89%) is water. East Palatka is drained by the St. Johns River.

== Demographics ==
Historical population
Census	Pop.	Note	%±
1990	1,989		—
2000	1,707		−14.2%
2010	1,654		−3.1%
2020	1,573		−4.9%
U.S. Decennial Census

=== 2020 census ===
As of the 2020 census, East Palatka had a population of 1,573. The median age was 41.4 years. 13.7% of residents were under the age of 18 and 18.4% of residents were 65 years of age or older. For every 100 females there were 152.1 males, and for every 100 females age 18 and over there were 166.1 males age 18 and over.

59.2% of residents lived in urban areas, while 40.8% lived in rural areas.

There were 457 households in East Palatka, of which 27.6% had children under the age of 18 living in them. Of all households, 44.2% were married-couple households, 17.7% were households with a male householder and no spouse or partner present, and 30.2% were households with a female householder and no spouse or partner present. About 24.7% of all households were made up of individuals and 14.0% had someone living alone who was 65 years of age or older.

There were 534 housing units, of which 14.4% were vacant. The homeowner vacancy rate was 2.4% and the rental vacancy rate was 7.6%.

Racial composition as of the 2020 census
Race	Number	Percent
White	1,062	67.5%
Black or African American	407	25.9%
American Indian and Alaska Native	12	0.8%
Asian	4	0.3%
Native Hawaiian and Other Pacific Islander	2	0.1%
Some other race	23	1.5%
Two or more races	63	4.0%
Hispanic or Latino (of any race)	114	7.2%

=== 2000 census ===
As of the census of 2000, there were 1,707 people, 521 households, and 365 families residing in the CDP. The population density was 532.3 inhabitants per square mile (205.5/km^{2}). There were 594 housing units at an average density of 185.2 per square mile (71.5/km^{2}). The racial makeup of the CDP was 59.64% White, 37.26% African American, 0.29% Native American, 1.00% Asian, 0.76% from other races, and 1.05% from two or more races. Hispanic or Latino of any race were 2.40% of the population.

There were 521 households, out of which 28.6% had children under the age of 18 living with them, 50.5% were married couples living together, 15.5% had a female householder with no husband present, and 29.9% were non-families. 25.3% of all households were made up of individuals, and 12.7% had someone living alone who was 65 years of age or older. The average household size was 2.50 and the average family size was 2.98.

In the CDP, the population was spread out, with 18.5% under the age of 18, 8.7% from 18 to 24, 36.7% from 25 to 44, 21.8% from 45 to 64, and 14.3% who were 65 years of age or older. The median age was 38 years. For every 100 females, there were 158.2 males. For every 100 females age 18 and over, there were 175.6 males.

The median income for a household in the CDP was $37,857, and the median income for a family was $46,071. Males had a median income of $31,507 versus $26,250 for females. The per capita income for the CDP was $18,478. About 12.6% of families and 17.4% of the population were below the poverty line, including 41.4% of those under age 18 and 12.8% of those age 65 or over.
