= Scottsmoor, Florida =

- CDP
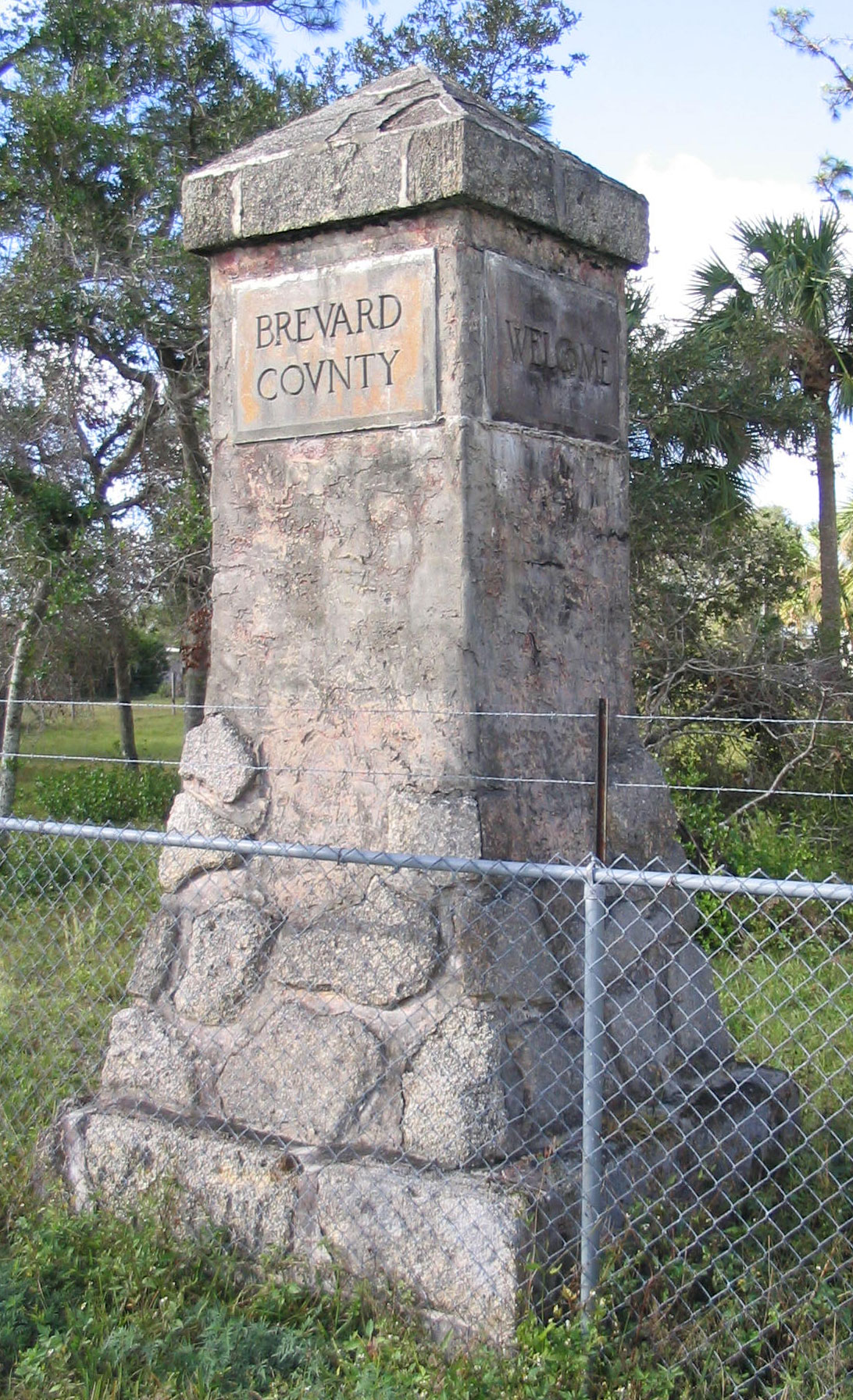
- U.S. 1 southbound entering Brevard County from Volusia County near Scottsmoor

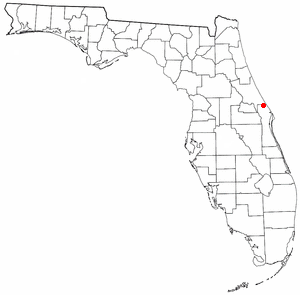
- Location in Brevard County and the state of Florida
- Coordinates: 28°46′02″N 80°52′16″W
- Country: United States
- State: Florida
- County: Brevard
- Elevation: 20 ft (6.1 m)

Population (2020)
  - Total: 692
- Time zone: UTC-5 (Eastern (EST))
  - Summer (DST): UTC-4 (EDT)
- ZIP code: 32754
- Area code: 321
- FIPS code: 12-64625
- GNIS ID: 2805192

Scottsmoor is an unincorporated community and census-designated place in the north end of Brevard County, Florida, United States. The population with 692 at the 2020 census. The community is part of the Palm Bay–Melbourne–Titusville Metropolitan Statistical Area. It is on U.S. 1, and also the northernmost settlement in the county. It is a farming community east of Interstate 95, similar to Malabar.

== Geography ==
Scottsmoor is situated at the north end of Brevard County. Bounded by the north is Volusia County; on the west by Interstate 95; on the east by the Indian River Lagoon; and on the south is Aurantia. Including precinct 106.

=== Climate ===
Climate data for Scottsmoor, Florida, 1991–2020 normals, extremes 2000–present
Month	Jan	Feb	Mar	Apr	May	Jun	Jul	Aug	Sep	Oct	Nov	Dec	Year
Record high °F (°C)	87 (31)	88 (31)	92 (33)	95 (35)	98 (37)	101 (38)	102 (39)	100 (38)	98 (37)	95 (35)	90 (32)	88 (31)	102 (39)
Mean maximum °F (°C)	83.5 (28.6)	84.9 (29.4)	87.5 (30.8)	90.7 (32.6)	93.5 (34.2)	95.6 (35.3)	95.7 (35.4)	95.8 (35.4)	93.9 (34.4)	90.9 (32.7)	86.3 (30.2)	84.4 (29.1)	97.1 (36.2)
Mean daily maximum °F (°C)	70.5 (21.4)	72.6 (22.6)	76.5 (24.7)	80.8 (27.1)	85.4 (29.7)	88.8 (31.6)	90.6 (32.6)	90.5 (32.5)	88.1 (31.2)	83.5 (28.6)	77.2 (25.1)	72.5 (22.5)	81.4 (27.4)
Daily mean °F (°C)	59.4 (15.2)	61.6 (16.4)	64.7 (18.2)	70.1 (21.2)	74.9 (23.8)	79.7 (26.5)	81.5 (27.5)	81.7 (27.6)	79.6 (26.4)	74.7 (23.7)	67.5 (19.7)	62.1 (16.7)	71.4 (21.9)
Mean daily minimum °F (°C)	48.2 (9.0)	50.5 (10.3)	52.8 (11.6)	59.4 (15.2)	64.4 (18.0)	70.5 (21.4)	72.4 (22.4)	72.8 (22.7)	71.2 (21.8)	65.8 (18.8)	57.7 (14.3)	51.7 (10.9)	61.5 (16.4)
Mean minimum °F (°C)	29.6 (−1.3)	32.3 (0.2)	34.1 (1.2)	44.1 (6.7)	52.4 (11.3)	63.3 (17.4)	67.3 (19.6)	68.8 (20.4)	63.9 (17.7)	48.7 (9.3)	39.3 (4.1)	33.9 (1.1)	27.6 (−2.4)
Record low °F (°C)	21 (−6)	25 (−4)	26 (−3)	30 (−1)	46 (8)	56 (13)	62 (17)	64 (18)	57 (14)	39 (4)	31 (−1)	18 (−8)	18 (−8)
Average precipitation inches (mm)	2.90 (74)	2.58 (66)	3.43 (87)	2.54 (65)	4.33 (110)	8.11 (206)	6.81 (173)	7.66 (195)	7.53 (191)	4.74 (120)	2.45 (62)	2.53 (64)	55.61 (1,412)
Source: NOAA (mean maxima/minima 2006–2020)

== History ==
Scottsmoor was settled in 1861 by James Garvin, who acquired the land through the Spanish Land Grant. The town gained resort community status in the 1920s. Today, all of the resorts have moved to Titusville because of its proximity to John F. Kennedy Space Center.

It is also on the Dixie Highway

Scottsmoor first appeared as a census designated place in the 2020 U.S. census.

== See also ==
- Malabar, Florida
