= Florida State Road 5 =

State highway in Florida, United States

State Road 5
- Signed portion of SR 5 in red; expand map to see remainder of SR 5 designated along US 1 and 17 in blue

Route information
- Maintained by FDOT
- Length: 536.724 mi (863.774 km) 6.784 miles (10.918 km) signed
- Existed: 1945 renumbering (definition)–present

Major junctions
- South end: US 1 / Fleming Street in Key West
- US 98 / SR 80 in West Palm Beach
- North end: US 17 / SR 25 in Kingsland, GA

Location
- Country: United States
- State: Florida
- Counties: Monroe, Miami-Dade, Broward, Palm Beach, Martin, St. Lucie, Indian River, Brevard, Volusia, Flagler, St. Johns, Duval, Nassau

Highway system
- Florida State Highway System; Interstate; US; State; Former; Pre‑1945; Toll; Scenic
← SR 4	→ SR 5A

State Road 5 (SR 5) is a mostly-unsigned state highway in the state of Florida. It is mainly signed as US 1 from its south end in Key West, Florida to Jacksonville, Florida, and US 17 from Jacksonville to the Georgia state line at the Saint Marys River. US 1 is SR 15 northwest from Jacksonville.

However, from northern Lantana through Lake Worth to Belvedere Road in West Palm Beach, SR 5 is separate from US 1, which runs to the west on the older but wider Dixie Highway. Here, SR 5 runs along a road named Olive Avenue.

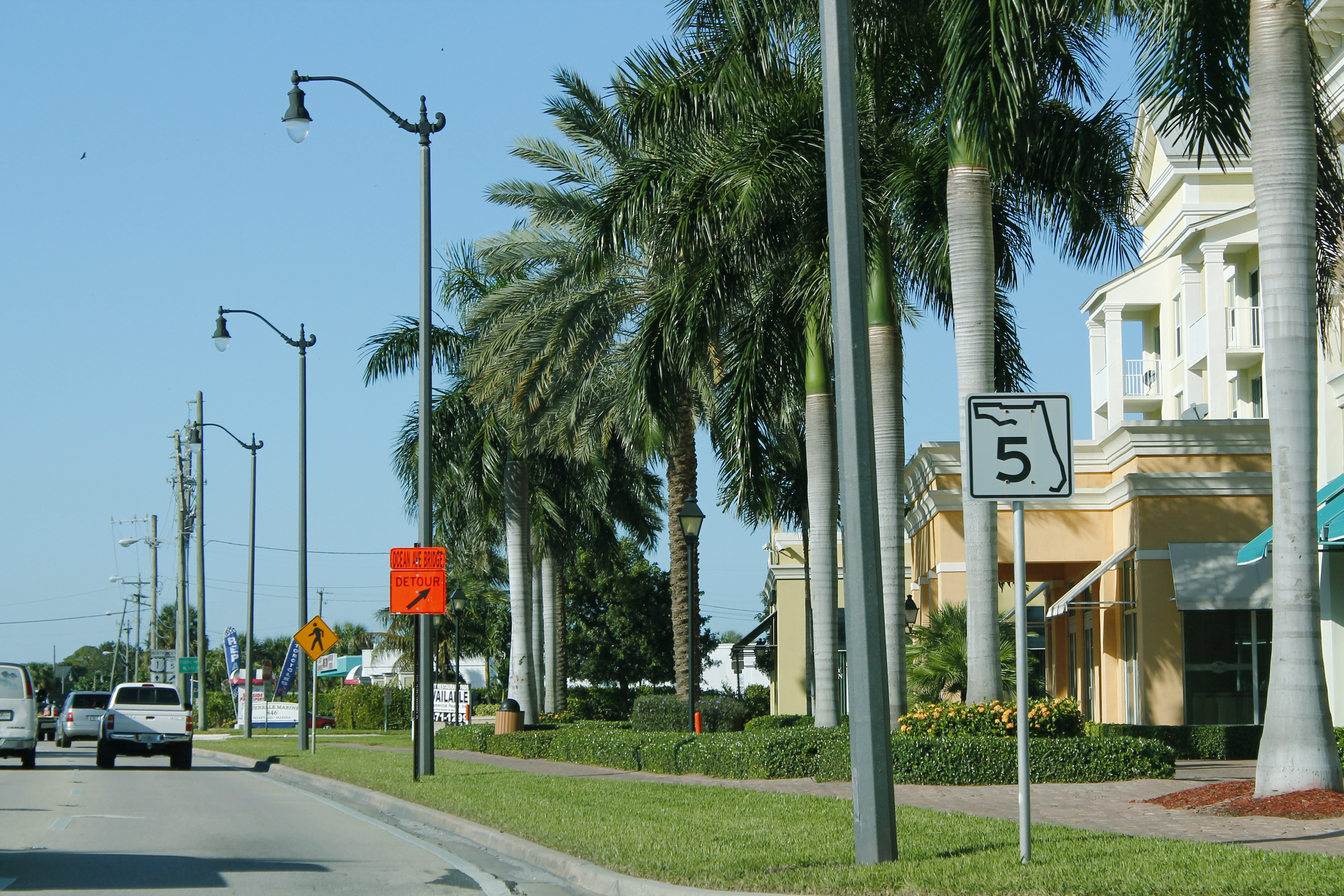

== Route description ==
SR 5 uses the parallel Olive Avenue from just north of County Road 812 (Lantana Road) in Lantana until Belvedere Road in West Palm Beach, where it turns west one block to rejoin Dixie Highway and US 1. Olive Avenue and Dixie Highway are parallel and extremely close to each other for this entire length. Olive Avenue is also signed as Federal Highway, but this name is not used as much.

== History ==
Until around 2004, Olive Avenue carried northbound US 1 (and SR 5) north from Dixie Highway (new US 1 / SR 805) to SR A1A. In 2004, US 1 was re-routed onto Dixie Highway without SR 5. Afterwards, FDOT started periodically relinquishing SR 5 in fragments between July 1, 2004 and April 7, 2011. FDOT has relinquished all of former SR 5 in the city of West Palm Beach. Therefore, SR 5 has a gap starting at the West Palm Beach-Lake Worth city line, and resumes at the US 1 intersection with Belvedere Road in West Palm Beach.

== Major intersections ==
County	Location	mi	km	Destinations	Notes
Monroe	Key West	0.000	0.000	Fleming Street	Southern terminus; south end of concurrency with US 1
see US 1 (mile 0.000-216.945)
Palm Beach	Lantana	216.945	349.139	US 1 north (Dixie Highway)	Northern terminus of concurrency with US 1; southern terminus of SR 805
Palm Beach	Lake Worth	218.590	351.787	SR 802 east (Lake Avenue)	One-way eastbound
Palm Beach	Lake Worth	218.639	351.865	SR 802 west (Lucerne Avenue)	One-way westbound
Palm Beach	Lake Worth	219.391	353.076	10th Avenue to I-95	
Palm Beach	West Palm Beach	220.596	355.015	C-51 Canal Bridge	Southern terminus of city maintenance
Palm Beach	West Palm Beach	221.300	356.148	Forest Hill Boulevard	To SR 882
Palm Beach	West Palm Beach	222.721	358.435	US 98 / SR 80 (Southern Boulevard) to I-95 / Florida's Turnpike	
Palm Beach	West Palm Beach	223.729	360.057	Olive Avenue	Former US 1 north
Palm Beach	West Palm Beach	223.834	360.226	US 1 south (Dixie Highway) to Belvedere Road / I-95	Northern terminus of city maintenance; southern terminus of concurrency with US 1; northern terminus of SR 805
see US 1 (mile 223.834-503.54)
Duval	Jacksonville	503.54	810.37	I-95 / US 1 north (SR 9)	Northern end of US 1 concurrency; northbound exit and southbound entrance (I-95 exit 348)
Duval	Jacksonville	503.820	810.820	Atlantic Boulevard	former US 90 / SR 10 east
Duval	Jacksonville	504.670	812.188	SR 13 south (Hendricks Avenue)	Southern end of SR 13 concurrency
Duval	Jacksonville	504.918	812.587	SR 13 north (Prudential Drive) to I-95	Northern end of SR 13 concurrency
Duval	Jacksonville	505.240	813.105	US 1 south / US 90 east (Main Street / SR 10 east)	Southern end of US 1/US 90/SR 10 concurrencies; northbound entrance and southbound exit
see US 1 (mile 504.918-507.69), US 17 (mile 288.08-317.070)
Nassau	Wilds Landing	537.002	864.221	US 17 north / SR 25 north – Kingsland, Brunswick	Georgia state line (St. Marys River Bridge over St. Marys River); northern terminus; north end of concurrency with US 17
1.000 mi = 1.609 km; 1.000 km = 0.621 mi: Concurrency terminus

== Related Routes ==
=== State Road 5A ===
State Road 5A
- Location: Volusia County
- Length: 15.613 mi (25.127 km)

State Road 5A, known locally as Nova Road, is a north-south road that runs 15.613 miles (25.127 km) through the cities of Port Orange, Daytona Beach, South Daytona and Ormond Beach in Volusia County. It serves as an alternate route to US 1 (SR 5), which runs to the east of SR 5A.

=== County Road 5A ===
County Road 5A
- Location: Scottsmoor

County Road 5A (also known as Stuckway Road) is a 1-mile (1.6 km) spur route of State Road 5 (U.S. Route 1.) It is the northernmost Brevard County route, and also the shortest. From Interstate 95, it provides access to Oak Hill and Scottsmoor, the northernmost town in Brevard. However, at its eastern terminus, it isn't in the town limits of Scottsmoor. Geographically, it is bounded by Volusia County to the north, and Aurantia to the south. The western terminus is with an interchange with Interstate 95 (exit 231), although Stuckway Road continues west as a dirt road. The eastern terminus is with an intersection with U.S. Route 1/State Road 5 near Scottsmoor.

=== State Road 5F ===
State Road 5F
- Location: Miami
- Length: 0.128 mi (206 m)

State Road 5F is the unsigned designation for the Southeast 2nd Street and Southeast 2nd Avenue frontage road in Downtown Miami. The road runs 0.128 miles (0.206 km) from Southeast 3rd Avenue to the Downtown Distributor and is a one-way southbound street. SR 5F runs in the same right-of-way as US 1 (SR 5) and is separated only by a concrete curb.

=== State Road 5S ===
State Road 5S
- Location: Key Largo
- Length: 0.77 mi (1,240 m)

State Road 5S is the unsigned designation for both Yacht Club Drive and Gilberts Resort Drive in Key Largo, running 0.246 miles (0.396 km) and 0.524 miles (0.843 km) respectively. The roads serve as access roads for motorists on US 1 (SR 5) as well as destinations for Gilbert's Resort & Marina and the Anchorage Resort & Yacht Club.

=== State Road 963 ===
State Road 963
- Location: Miami-Dade County
- Length: 0.24 mi (390 m)

State Road 963, part of Southwest 424th Street, is a short frontage road running west of US 1 (SR 5) in unincorporated Miami-Dade County south of Homestead. At the state road's northern end, it turns west as a local road, serving the Everglades Youth Academy.

Browse numbered routes
← SR 961	SR 963	→ SR 968

=== State Road 975 ===
State Road 975
- Location: Monroe County
- Length: 0.398 mi (641 m)

State Road 975, known locally as Saratoga Avenue, is a short frontage road running north of US 1 (SR 5) near the Key West Naval Air Station on Boca Chica Key. It runs 0.398 miles (0.641 km). SR 975 is both the only 900 numbered and the only three-digit state highway in Monroe County.

Browse numbered routes
← SR 973	SR 975	→ SR 976
