= Crescent Beach, St. Johns County, Florida =

Crescent Beach, Florida
- CDP
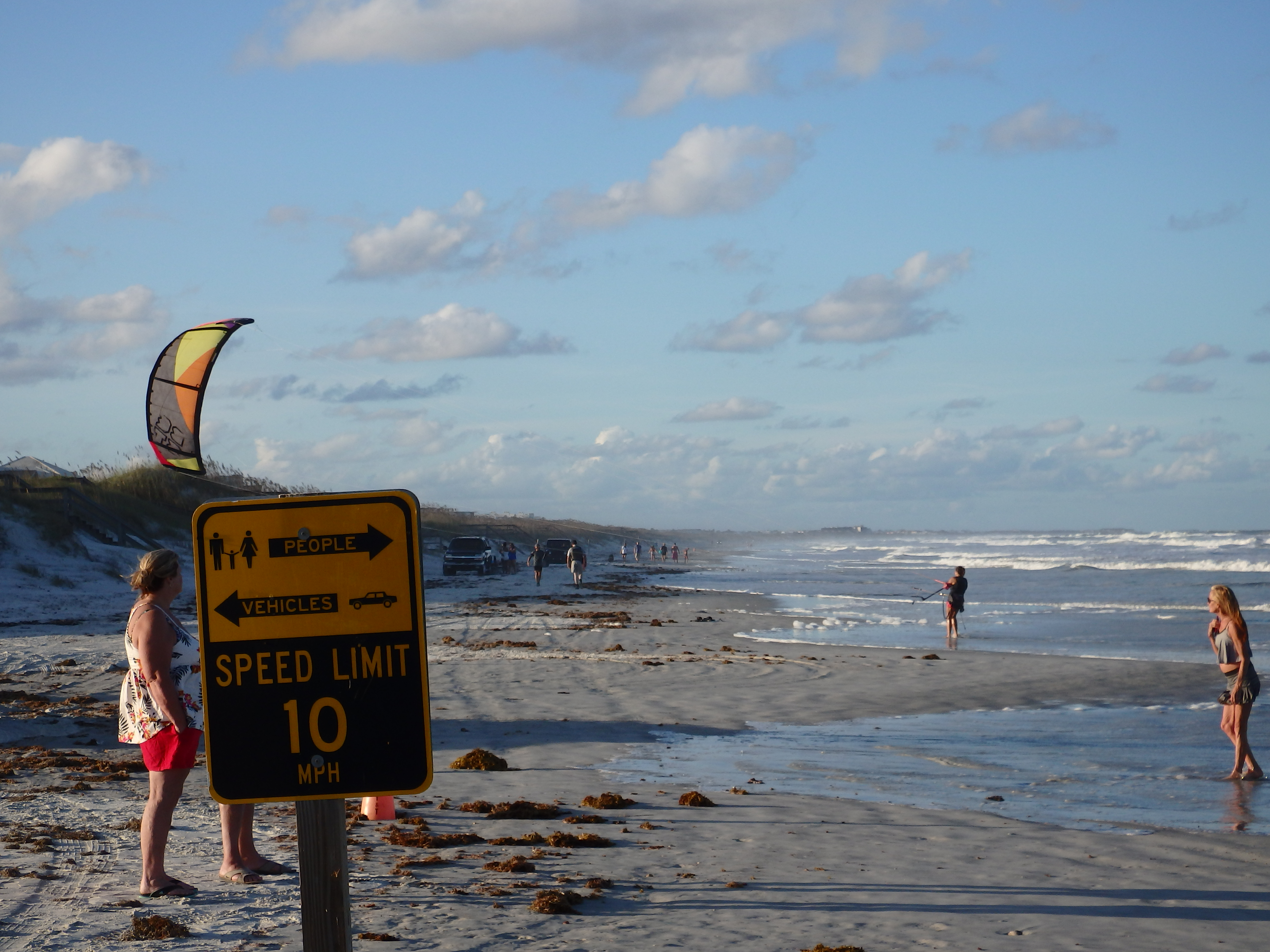

- Location in St. Johns County and the state of Florida
- Coordinates: 29°45′16″N 81°14′40″W
- Country: United States
- State: Florida
- County: St. Johns

Area
  - Total: 1.46 sq mi (3.78 km^{2})
  - Land: 1.44 sq mi (3.72 km^{2})
  - Water: 0.019 sq mi (0.05 km^{2})
- Elevation: 7 ft (2.1 m)

Population (2020)
  - Total: 844
  - Density: 586.8/sq mi (226.58/km^{2})
- Time zone: UTC-5 (Eastern (EST))
  - Summer (DST): UTC-4 (EDT)
- ZIP Code: 32080
- Area code: 904
- FIPS code: 12-15325
- GNIS feature ID: 2402803

Crescent Beach is an unincorporated census-designated place in St. Johns County, Florida, United States. The population was 844 at the 2020 census, down from 931 at the 2010 census. It is part of the Jacksonville, Florida Metropolitan Statistical Area.

== Geography ==
According to the United States Census Bureau, the community has a total area of 1.5 square miles (3.9 km^{2}), all land.

== Demographics ==
Historical population
Census	Pop.	Note	%±
1990	1,081		—
2000	985		−8.9%
2010	931		−5.5%
2020	844		−9.3%
U.S. Decennial Census

As of the census of 2000, there were 985 people, 530 households, and 299 families residing in the community. The population density was 646.2 inhabitants per square mile (249.5/km^{2}). There were 1,535 housing units at an average density of 1,007.1 per square mile (388.8/km^{2}). The racial makeup of the community was 97.36% White, 0.10% African American, 0.51% Native American, 0.41% Asian, 0.20% Pacific Islander, and 1.42% from two or more races. Hispanic or Latino of any race were 0.81% of the population.

There were 530 households, out of which 9.4% had children under the age of 18 living with them, 50.8% were married couples living together, 3.2% had a female householder with no husband present, and 43.4% were non-families. 35.3% of all households were made up of individuals, and 16.6% had someone living alone who was 65 years of age or older. The average household size was 1.86 and the average family size was 2.33.

The population was spread out, with 8.8% under the age of 18, 4.5% from 18 to 24, 17.6% from 25 to 44, 32.8% from 45 to 64, and 36.3% who were 65 years of age or older. The median age was 57 years. For every 100 females, there were 105.6 males. For every 100 females age 18 and over, there were 100.4 males.

The median income for a household in the community was $39,821, and the median income for a family was $49,712. Males had a median income of $42,750 versus $29,091 for females. The per capita income for the community was $32,279. None of the families and 8.9% of the population were living below the poverty line, including no under eighteens and 4.8% of those over 64.

== Education ==
It is in the St. Johns County School District.

Zoned schools include W. D. Hartley Elementary School, Gamble Rogers Middle School, and Pedro Menendez High School.
