= Anastasia State Park =

State park in Florida, United States

- IUCN category IV (habitat/species management area)
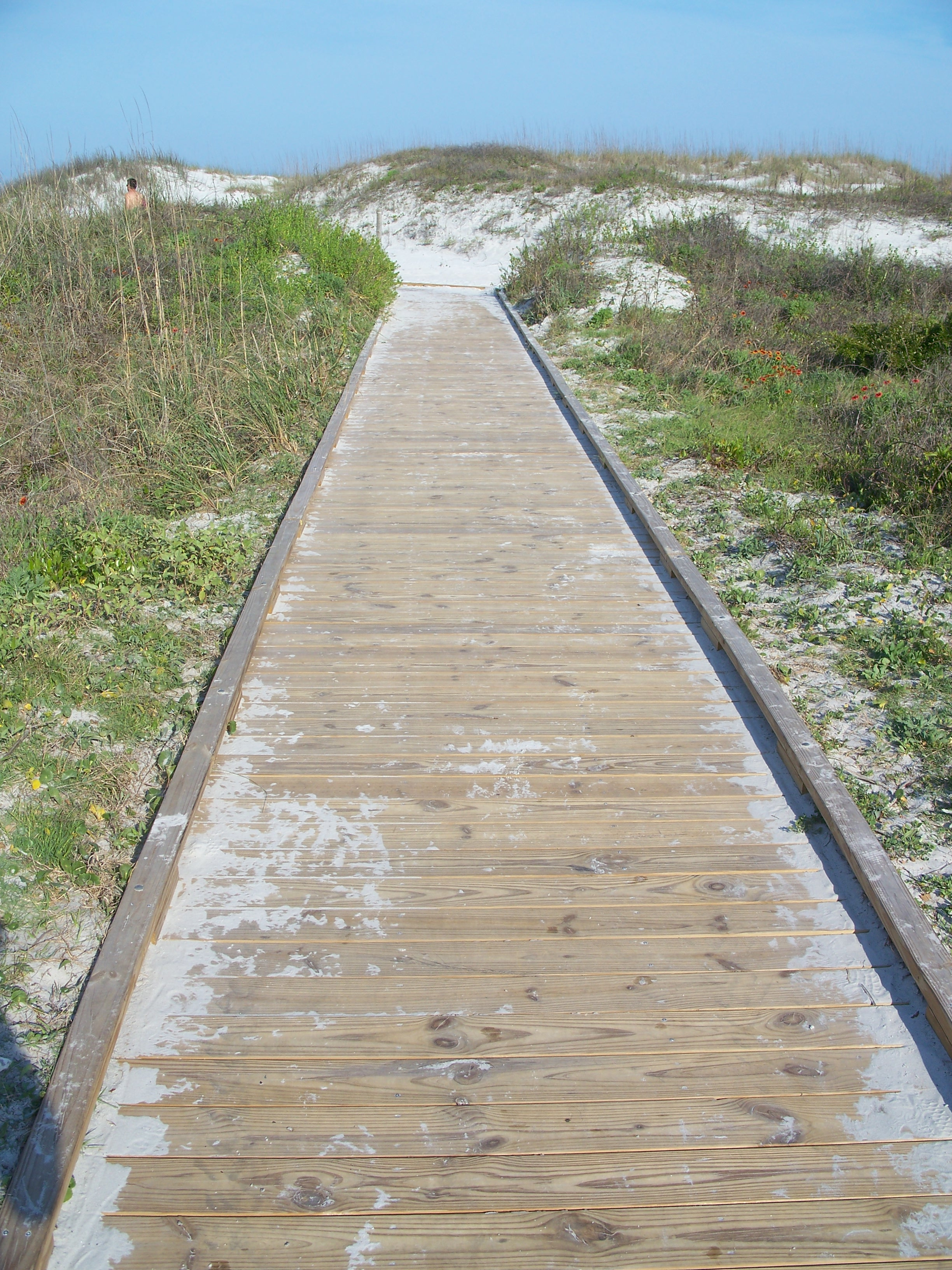
- Boardwalk to beach, Anastasia State Park

- Location within Florida Location within the United States
- Interactive map of Anastasia State Park
- Location: St. Johns County, Florida, United States
- Nearest city: St. Augustine, Florida
- Coordinates: 29°51′43″N 81°16′23″W
- Area: 1,700 acres (6.9 km^{2})
- Established: 1949
- Governing body: Florida Department of Environmental Protection

Anastasia State Park is a 1,600-acre (6.5 km^{2}) state park in Florida, United States. Its location is on a peninsula on Anastasia Island across Matanzas Bay from downtown St. Augustine along the Atlantic coastal plain. This park has a variety of wildlife, birds and plants in a setting of beaches, tidal salt marsh, and marine and upland hammock.

It is also home to the Old Spanish Coquina Quarries, an archaeological site from which the coquina stone used in the construction of the Castillo de San Marcos in St. Augustine was mined, earning it a spot on the National Register of Historic Places.

Acquired by the state of Florida in 1949.

== Recreational activities ==
Activities include bird watching, camping, fishing, sun bathing, beachcombing, running, surfing, sail boarding, swimming, kayaking, hiking, and picnicking.

Along with park interpretive programs and nature trails, there is also a campground.

== Hours ==
Florida state parks are open between 8 a.m. and sundown every day of the year (including holidays).

== See also ==
- Fort Mose Historic State Park
- St. Augustine Amphitheatre

== References and external links ==
- Anastasia State Park at Florida State Parks
