= Hastings, Florida =

Town in the state of Florida, United States

Hastings
- Census-designated place
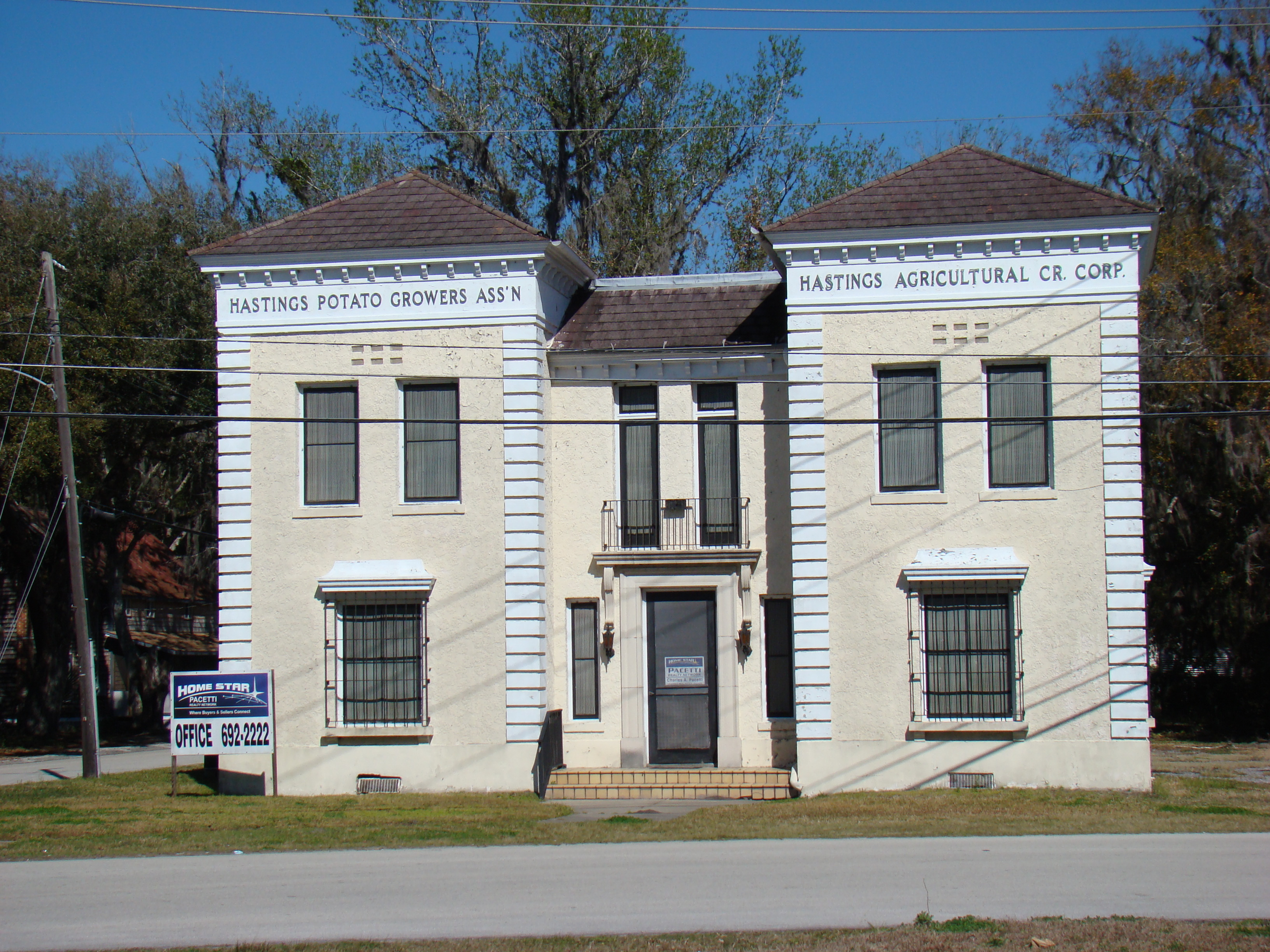
- Potato Growers Association building in Hastings, Florida

- Location in St. Johns County and the state of Florida
- Coordinates: 29°42′53″N 81°30′13″W
- Country: United States
- State: Florida
- County: St. Johns
- Settled: 1890
- Incorporated: 1909
- Dissolved: March 1, 2018

Area
  - Total: 3.24 sq mi (8.40 km^{2})
  - Land: 3.24 sq mi (8.39 km^{2})
  - Water: 0.0039 sq mi (0.01 km^{2})
- Elevation: 7 ft (2.1 m)

Population (2020)
  - Total: 1,262
  - Density: 389.6/sq mi (150.41/km^{2})
- Time zone: UTC-5 (Eastern (EST))
  - Summer (DST): UTC-4 (EDT)
- Zip code: 32145
- Area code: 904
- FIPS code: 12-29100
- GNIS feature ID: 2797201
- Website: www.hastings-fl.com

Hastings is an unincorporated census-designated place and agricultural center in St. Johns County, Florida, United States, 18 miles (29 km) southwest of St. Augustine. It was formerly an incorporated town, but it was dissolved in 2018 after a vote by residents. Its population was 1,262 at the 2020 census, up from 580 at the 2010 census. It is part of the Jacksonville, Florida metropolitan statistical area.

== History ==
Henry Morrison Flagler built tourist hotels at St. Augustine in the late 19th century, including the Ponce de León Hotel. He needed a local source of fresh vegetables for his guests, so he persuaded Thomas Horace Hastings, his cousin, to develop a farm. A small community evolved into a town, which was named for its founder in 1890. Hastings is known as the "Potato Capital of Florida", with 21,000 acres (85 km^{2}) of potato farms, but it also produces cabbage, onions, eggplant, and ornamental horticulture.

Hastings in 1910 was a thriving town that was a stop on the Florida East Coast Railway. The population of approximately 1,200 people supported several general stores, a bakery, drug stores, meat markets, an ice plant, and cold storage. In addition to farming, two companies manufactured barrels and a gristmill ground grain. A bank and a hotel, three doctors, and a dentist were available. The town had water and sewer utilities and telephone and telegraph service. The local public school was good. The former FEC line is now part of the Palatka-to-St. Augustine State Trail, and a trailhead can be found in the community within the Cora C. Harrison Preserve.

On November 7, 2017, the voters of Hastings elected to dissolve the city with an 82% majority vote. St. Johns County officially took control of the area on March 1, 2018. The United States Census Bureau designated Hastings as a census-designated place in the 2020 census.

== Geography ==
According to the United States Census Bureau, the town had a total area of 0.7 square miles (1.8 km^{2}), all land.

=== Climate ===
Climate data for Hastings, Florida, 1991-2020 normals, extremes 1978–present
| Month | Jan | Feb | Mar | Apr | May | Jun | Jul | Aug | Sep | Oct | Nov | Dec | Year |
|---|---|---|---|---|---|---|---|---|---|---|---|---|---|
| Record high °F (°C) | 86 (30) | 87 (31) | 92 (33) | 93 (34) | 99 (37) | 104 (40) | 102 (39) | 102 (39) | 97 (36) | 93 (34) | 90 (32) | 86 (30) | 104 (40) |
| Mean maximum °F (°C) | 81.5 (27.5) | 82.8 (28.2) | 86.0 (30.0) | 89.0 (31.7) | 93.6 (34.2) | 96.1 (35.6) | 95.9 (35.5) | 95.4 (35.2) | 93.2 (34.0) | 89.5 (31.9) | 85.4 (29.7) | 82.0 (27.8) | 97.0 (36.1) |
| Mean daily maximum °F (°C) | 67.8 (19.9) | 70.2 (21.2) | 74.8 (23.8) | 80.3 (26.8) | 85.6 (29.8) | 89.4 (31.9) | 91.1 (32.8) | 90.3 (32.4) | 87.3 (30.7) | 81.8 (27.7) | 74.8 (23.8) | 69.5 (20.8) | 80.2 (26.8) |
| Daily mean °F (°C) | 56.2 (13.4) | 58.8 (14.9) | 63.0 (17.2) | 68.0 (20.0) | 74.1 (23.4) | 79.4 (26.3) | 81.5 (27.5) | 81.3 (27.4) | 78.8 (26.0) | 72.2 (22.3) | 64.3 (17.9) | 58.8 (14.9) | 69.7 (20.9) |
| Mean daily minimum °F (°C) | 44.7 (7.1) | 47.4 (8.6) | 51.1 (10.6) | 55.8 (13.2) | 62.5 (16.9) | 69.4 (20.8) | 71.9 (22.2) | 72.4 (22.4) | 70.3 (21.3) | 62.5 (16.9) | 53.9 (12.2) | 48.1 (8.9) | 59.2 (15.1) |
| Mean minimum °F (°C) | 27.5 (−2.5) | 29.3 (−1.5) | 33.5 (0.8) | 41.0 (5.0) | 50.6 (10.3) | 62.4 (16.9) | 67.0 (19.4) | 67.6 (19.8) | 61.8 (16.6) | 47.3 (8.5) | 36.5 (2.5) | 31.6 (−0.2) | 25.6 (−3.6) |
| Record low °F (°C) | 12 (−11) | 21 (−6) | 25 (−4) | 33 (1) | 42 (6) | 49 (9) | 59 (15) | 60 (16) | 51 (11) | 35 (2) | 27 (−3) | 17 (−8) | 12 (−11) |
| Average precipitation inches (mm) | 3.02 (77) | 2.97 (75) | 3.40 (86) | 2.82 (72) | 4.27 (108) | 7.47 (190) | 6.44 (164) | 7.44 (189) | 8.38 (213) | 4.63 (118) | 2.42 (61) | 3.01 (76) | 56.27 (1,429) |
| Average precipitation days (≥ 0.01 in) | 8.2 | 7.4 | 7.5 | 6.3 | 7.2 | 14.7 | 14.4 | 15.6 | 13.6 | 10.0 | 7.3 | 7.8 | 120.0 |
Source: NOAA

== Demographics ==
Historical population
| Census | Pop. | Note | %± |
|---|---|---|---|
| 1910 | 399 | | — |
| 1920 | 761 | | 90.7% |
| 1930 | 673 | | −11.6% |
| 1940 | 1,035 | | 53.8% |
| 1950 | 577 | | −44.3% |
| 1960 | 617 | | 6.9% |
| 1970 | 628 | | 1.8% |
| 1980 | 636 | | 1.3% |
| 1990 | 595 | | −6.4% |
| 2000 | 521 | | −12.4% |
| 2010 | 580 | | 11.3% |
| 2020 | 1,262 | | 117.6% |
U.S. Decennial Census

As of the 2000 census, 521 people, 213 households, and 139 families were residing in the town. The population density was 790.5 inhabitants per square mile (305.2/km^{2}). The 238 housing units had an average density of 361.1 units per square mile (139.4 units/km^{2}). The racial makeup of the town was 52.02% White, 43.38% African American, 0.58% Pacific Islander, 2.11% from other races, and 1.92% from two or more races. Hispanics or Latinos of any race were 4.99% of the population.

Of the 213 households, 27.7% had children under 18 living with them, 46.9% were married couples living together, 15.5% had a female householder with no husband present, and 34.3% were not families. About 29.6% of all households were made up of individuals, and 13.1% had someone living alone who was 65 or older. The average household size was 2.44, and the average family size was 3.00.

In the town, the age distribution was 26.1% under 18, 7.3% from 18 to 24, 27.3% from 25 to 44, 21.7% from 45 to 64, and 17.7% who were 65 or older. The median age was 38 years. For every 100 females, there were 84.8 males. For every 100 females 18 and over, there were 79.9 males.

The median income in the town for a household was $26,635 and for a family was $30,769. Males had a median income of $25,909 versus $20,694 for females. The per capita income for the town was $14,537. About 15.4% of families and 21.0% of the population were below the poverty line, including 27.0% of those under 18 and 16.3% of those 65 or over.

== Education ==
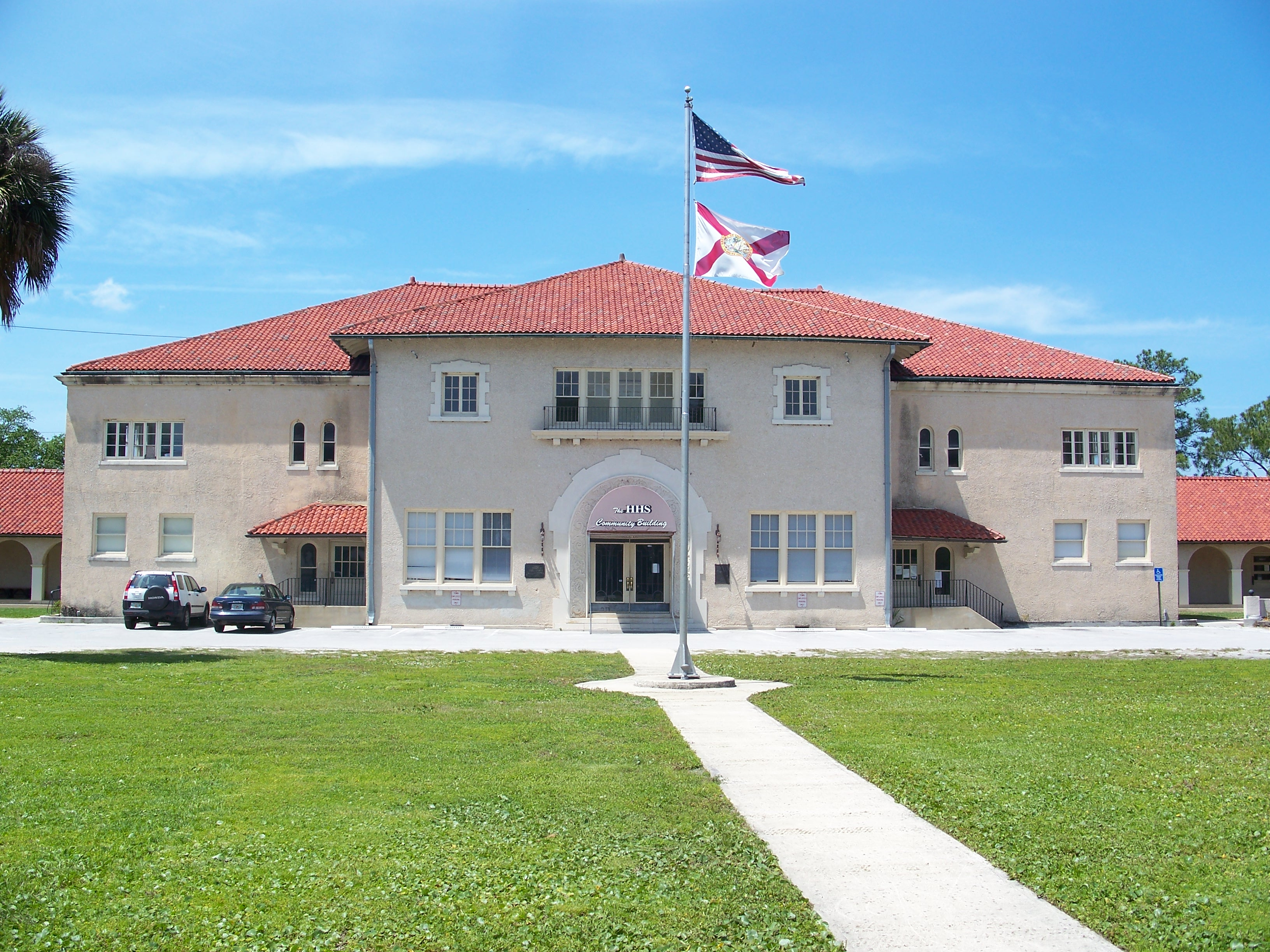
The former Hastings High School, which now includes a library of St. Johns County Public Library

It is in the St. Johns County School District.

Zoned schools include South Woods Elementary School, Gamble Rogers Middle School, and Pedro Menendez High School.

The Hastings High School was built in 1924 to provide education for the children of the farmers in the southwest corner of the county. In 1985 it closed, and the Hastings Branch of the St. Johns County Public Library is located in this building. Hastings Elementary School was replaced by Hastings Elementary-Junior High School, which occupied the former high school facility, in 1985. In 1992, it dropped its junior high school program. The school, now Hastings Elementary School, was in operation until its 2005 closure. South Woods Elementary opened in the fall of that year, replacing Hastings Elementary.

The only public school in the town after 2005 was the Hastings Youth Academy, an alternative school.

St. Johns County Public Library has a library in the former school.

== Notable people ==
- Zack Bryant (born 1997), basketball player in the Israeli Basketball Premier League
- Derrick Ramsey (born 1956), Kentucky secretary of education and workforce development and former NFL player
- Ron Waller, American football player
