= List of places in Florida: M =

This list of current cities, towns, unincorporated communities, counties, and other recognized places in the U.S. state of Florida also includes information on the number and names of counties in which the place lies, and its lower and upper ZIP Code bounds, if applicable.

Name of place	Number of counties	Counties	Lower zip code	Upper zip code
Mabel	1	Sumter	33514	
Mabry Manor	1	Leon		
McAllister	1	Marion	32663	
McAlpin	1	Suwannee	32062	
Macclenny	1	Baker	32063	
McDavid	1	Escambia	32568	
MacDill Air Force Base	1	Hillsborough	33608	
MacDill Field	1	Hillsborough		
McDonald	1	Orange		
McFall	1	Marion		
McGregor	1	Lee		
McGregor Gardens	1	Lee	33901	
McGregor Groves	1	Lee	33901	
McIntosh	1	Marion	32664	
McIntyre	1	Franklin		
Mack Bayou	1	Walton	32459	
McKinnon	1	Escambia	32568	
McLellan	1	Santa Rosa	32570	
McMeekin	1	Putnam	32640	
McNeal	1	Calhoun		
McNeils	1	Gulf		
McPherson	1	Baker		
McRae	1	Clay	32656	
Madeira Beach	1	Pinellas	33708	
Madison	1	Madison	32340	
Magnet Cove	1	Gadsden	32333	
Magnolia	1	Walton		
Magnolia Beach	1	Bay	32401	
Magnolia Bluffs	1	Franklin		
Magnolia Gardens	1	Duval	32209	
Magnolia Springs	1	Clay	32043	
Mail Xpress	1	Duval	32216	
Mainland	1	Volusia	32074	
Mainlands Center	1	Pinellas	33565	
Maitland	1	Orange	32751	
Majette	1	Bay		
Malabar	1	Brevard	32950	
Malone	1	Jackson	32445	
Mammoth	1	Polk		
Manalapan	1	Palm Beach	33460	
Manasota	1	Sarasota	34260	
Manasota Beach	1	Sarasota		
Manasota Key	1	Charlotte	33533	
Manatee	1	Manatee	33508	
Manatee Road	1	Levy		
Manavista	1	Manatee		
Mandarin	1	Duval	32217	
Mango	1	Hillsborough	33550	
Mango Hills	1	Hillsborough	33584	
Mangonia Park	1	Palm Beach	33406	
Mango-Seffner	1	Hillsborough		
Mangrove Square	1	St. Lucie	33452	
Manhattan	1	Manatee		
Manhattan Beach	1	Duval		
Mannfield	1	Citrus		
Manning	1	Baker		
Manns Spur	1	Baker		
Mannville	1	Putnam	32048	
Mar-a-Lago National Historic Site	1	Palm Beach	33480	
Marathon	1	Monroe	33050	
Marathon Shores	1	Monroe	33052	
Maravilla	1	St. Lucie	33450	
Marco	1	Collier	33937	
Marco Island	1	Collier	33937	
Marcy	1	Martin		
Margaretta	1	Baker		
Margate	1	Broward	33063	
Margate Estates	1	Broward	33063	
Marianna	1	Jackson	32446	
Maricamp	1	Marion	32670	
Marietta	1	Duval	32205	
Marineland	2	Flagler, St. Johns	32084	
Marion	1	Hamilton		
Marion Oaks	1	Marion	34473	
Marland	1	Highlands		
Mars	1	Palm Beach		
Martel	1	Marion	32670	
Martin	1	Marion	32670	
Mart Law Seminole Village	1	Miami-Dade		
Mary Esther	1	Okaloosa	32569	
Marysville	1	Calhoun		
Masaryktown	1	Hernando	34609	
Mascotte	1	Lake	34753	
Mason	1	Columbia	32055	
Matecumbe	1	Monroe		
Matlacha	1	Lee	33909	
Matlacha Isles-Matlacha Shores	1	Lee		
Matoaka	1	Manatee	33588	
Mattox	1	Nassau		
Maxcy Quarters	1	Polk	33843	
Maxville	1	Duval	32265	
Mayo	1	Lafayette	32066	
Mayo Junction	1	Lafayette	32066	
Mayport	1	Duval	32227	
Mayport Naval Station	1	Duval	32228	
Maysland	1	Madison		
Maytown	1	Volusia		
Meadowbrook	1	Clay	32073	
Meadowbrook	1	Orange	32808	
Meadowbrook Terrace	1	Clay	32073	
Meadowcrest	1	Citrus		
Meadow Oaks	1	Pasco		
Meadow Woods	1	Orange		
Mecca	1	Seminole	32771	
Medart	1	Wakulla	32327	
Medley	1	Miami-Dade	33166	
Medulla	1	Polk	33803	
Melaleuca Isle	1	Broward	33314	
Melbourne	1	Brevard	32901	36
Melbourne Beach	1	Brevard	32951	
Melbourne Gardens	1	Brevard	32901	
Melbourne Shores	1	Brevard	32951	
Melbourne Village	1	Brevard	32901	
Meldrim Park	1	St. Johns		
Melrose	4	Alachua, Bradford, Clay, Putnam	32666	
Melrose Park	1	Broward	33314	
Melrose Park	1	Columbia	32055	
Memphis	1	Manatee	33561	
Memphis Heights	1	Manatee		
Mercer	1	Suwannee		
Meredith Manor	1	Seminole	32750	
Merediths	1	Levy		
Meridian	1	Leon	32301	
Merritt Island	1	Brevard	32952	54
MetroWest	1	Orange		
Mexico Beach	1	Bay	32410	
Miad	1	Miami-Dade		
Miami	1	Miami-Dade	33101	99
Miami Beach	1	Miami-Dade	33139	
Miami Beach Coast Guard Base	1	Miami-Dade	33139	
Miami Gardens	1	Broward	33017	
Miami Gardens	1	Miami-Dade	33017	
Miami Gardens-Utopia-Carver	1	Broward		
Miami Lakes	1	Miami-Dade	33014	
Miami Park	1	Miami-Dade		
Miami Plantation	1	Miami-Dade		
Miami Shores	1	Miami-Dade	33138	
Miami Springs	1	Miami-Dade	33166	
Micanopy	1	Alachua	32667	
Micanopy Junction	1	Alachua		
Micco	1	Brevard	32976	
Miccosukee	1	Leon	32309	
Miccosukee Indian Reservation	2	Broward, Miami-Dade	33030	
Mickler Landing	1	St. Johns		
Middleburg	1	Clay	32068	
Middle River	1	Broward		
Middle River Manor	1	Broward		
Middle River Vista	1	Broward		
Middle Torch Key	1	Monroe		
Mid Florida	1	Seminole	32799	
Mid Florida Lakes	1	Lake		
Midriver	1	Broward		
Mid Town Plaza	1	Sarasota	33579	
Mid Venice	1	Sarasota	33595	
Midway	1	Gadsden	32343	
Midway	1	Hillsborough	33566	
Midway	1	Lafayette		
Midway	1	Santa Rosa		
Midway	1	Seminole	32771	
Midway-Canaan	1	Seminole		
Mikesville	1	Columbia	32055	
Milan	1	Columbia		
Mildred	1	Okeechobee		
Miles City	1	Collier		
Military Park	1	Palm Beach		
Mill Bayou	1	Bay		
Mill Creek	1	St. Johns	32084	
Miller	1	Union		
Miller Bend	1	Walton		
Miller Crossroads	1	Holmes		
Millers Ferry	1	Washington		
Miller Square	1	Miami-Dade	33175	
Millhopper Center	1	Alachua	32605	
Milligan	1	Okaloosa	32537	
Millspring	1	Jackson	32442	
Milltown	1	Gulf	32456	
Millview	1	Escambia	32506	
Millville	1	Bay	32401	
Millwood	1	Marion		
Milton	1	Santa Rosa	32570	
Mims	1	Brevard	32754	
Mincoll	1	Citrus		
Mineco	1	Polk		
Minehead	1	Marion		
Mineral Springs	1	Santa Rosa	32565	
Minneola	1	Lake	34755	
Minorville	1	Orange		
Mintons Corner	1	Brevard	32901	
Miracle Mile	1	Lee	33901	
Miramar	1	Broward	33023	
Miramar Beach	1	Walton	32541	
Miramar Terrace	1	Duval	32226	
Mission Bay	1	Palm Beach		
Mission City	1	Volusia	32069	
Mitchell Beach	1	Pinellas		
Mitchell Lake Estates	1	Miami-Dade		
Mobile Haven Estates	1	Lee	33901	
Mobile Home Park	1	Sarasota	33577	
Mobile Manor	1	Seminole	32750	
Modello	1	Miami-Dade	33030	
Moffitt	1	Hardee	33890	
Mohawk	1	Lake		
Molasses Junction	1	St. Johns		
Molino	1	Escambia	32577	
Molino Crossroads	1	Escambia	32533	
Monet	1	Palm Beach		
Money Bayou	1	Gulf	32456	
Monkey Box	1	Glades		
Monroe	1	Collier	33943	
Monroe Station	1	Collier		
Monroes Corner	1	Marion	32691	
Montague	1	Marion		
Montbrook	1	Levy	32696	
Montclair	1	Lake	32748	
Monteocha	1	Alachua	32601	
Monterey	1	Duval	32211	
Monte Vista	1	Lake		
Monticello	1	Jefferson	32344	
Montivilla	1	Jefferson		
Montura	1	Hendry		
Montverde	1	Lake	34756	
Montverde Junction	1	Lake		
Moon Lake	1	Pasco		
Moore Haven	1	Glades	33471	
Moreland Park	1	Sumter	32785	
Morgan Place	1	Franklin		
Morgantown	1	Charlotte		
Moriczville	1	Hillsborough		
Morningside Park	1	Orange	32809	
Morris Mine	1	Polk		
Morrison Home	1	Palm Beach	33406	
Morriston	1	Levy	32668	
Morse Shores	1	Lee	33905	
Moseley Hall	1	Madison	32331	
Mosquito Grove	1	Lake		
Moss Bluff	1	Marion	32679	
Moss Town	1	Pasco		
Mossy Head	1	Walton	32434	
Mott	1	Palm Beach		
Moultrie	1	St. Johns	32084	
Moultrie Junction	1	St. Johns	32084	
Mound Grove	1	Volusia		
Mountain Lake	1	Polk	33853	
Mountain Lake Station	1	Polk		
Mountain Park	1	Hernando		
Mount Carmel	1	Santa Rosa	32565	
Mount Carrie	1	Columbia		
Mount Dora	1	Lake	32757	
Mount Enon	1	Hillsborough		
Mount Homer	1	Lake		
Mount Olive	1	Marion		
Mount Pleasant	1	Gadsden	32352	
Mount Plymouth	1	Lake	32776	
Mount Royal	1	Putnam	32093	
Muse	1	Glades		
Muddy Ford	1	Santa Rosa		
Mulat	1	Santa Rosa	32570	
Mulberry	1	Polk	33860	
Mullet Lake Park	1	Seminole		
Mullinsville	1	Polk	33843	
Mullis City	1	Hillsborough	33618	
Municipal Trailer Park	1	Hillsborough		
Munson	1	Santa Rosa	32570	
Munson Island	1	Monroe	33040	
Murat Hills	1	Leon		
Murdock	1	Charlotte	33938	
Murray Hill	1	Duval	32205	
Muscogee	1	Escambia		
Muse	1	Glades		
Myakka	1	Manatee		
Myakka City	1	Manatee	34251	
Myakka Head	1	Manatee	33865	
Myakka River Manor	1	Sarasota	33595	
Myerlee	1	Lee	33901	
Myrtis	1	Columbia	32055	
Myrtle Grove	1	Escambia	32506	
Myrtle Island	1	Flagler		

== See also ==
- Florida
- List of municipalities in Florida
- List of former municipalities in Florida
- List of counties in Florida
- List of census-designated places in Florida
