= Midway, Florida =

Midway is the name of some places in the U.S. state of Florida:

- Midway, Gadsden County, Florida
- Midway, Hillsborough County, Florida, a place in Florida
- Midway, Lafayette County, Florida, Lafayette County, Florida
- Midway, Santa Rosa County, Florida
- Midway, Seminole County, Florida
