= List of county roads in Clay County, Florida =

- County road shields used in Clay County

Highway names
- Interstates: Interstate X (I-X)
- US Highways: U.S. Highway X (US X)
- State: State Road X (SR X)
- County: County Road X (CR X)

System links
- County roads in Florida; County roads in Clay County

The following is a list of county roads in Clay County, Florida. All county roads are maintained by the county in which they reside, however not all of them are marked with standard MUTCD approved county road shields.

== List of County Roads in Clay County, Florida ==
Route number	Road Name(s)	Direction and Termini					Notes
CR 15A		S/N	US 17	South of Green Cove Springs	Oakridge Avenue / Green Cove Avenue	Green Cove Springs	former SR 15A
CR 15A	Hibernia Road, Pine Avenue, Bald Eagle Road	S/N	US 17 / Fleming Plantation Boulevard	Hibernia	US 17 / CR 220	Fleming Island	former SR 15A
CR 15A	Westover Road	S/N	Dead end	Fleming Island	US 17 / Harbor Island Drive	Fleming Island	former SR 15A
CR 15A	Creighton Road	W/E	Dead end	Fleming Island	US 17	Fleming Island	former SR 15A
CR 15A	Holly Point Road W. Plainfield Avenue; Campbell Avenue	S/N	US 17 (Park Avenue) / Holly Point Road E.	Orange Park	US 17 (Park Avenue) / Campbell Avenue	Orange Park	former SR 15A
CR 15A	Wells Road	W/E	SR 21 (Blanding Boulevard)	Bellair–Meadowbrook Terrace	US 17 (Park Avenue)	Orange Park	former SR 15A
CR 15B	Raggedy Point Road	S/N	Dead end	Fleming Island	CR 15A (Pine Avenue) / Raggedy Point Court	Fleming Island	former SR 15B
CR 16A	Kingsley Lake Drive	W/E	SR 16	Kingsley Lake	SR 16	North of Kingsley Beach	former SR 16A
CR 16A	Randall Road	W/E	SR 16	Southwest of Green Cove Springs	SR 16	Southwest of Green Cove Springs	
CR 21A	Forman Circle	S/N	SR 21	Middleburg	SR 21	Middleburg	former SR 21A
CR 21A	Black Creek Drive	S/N	Black Creek Drive	East of Middleburg	CR 218	East of Middleburg	
CR 21B	Taylor Avenue; Harrison Avenue; Cleveland Avenue	S/N	SR 21 (Blanding Boulevard)	Lakeside	SR 21 (Blanding Boulevard)	Lakeside	
CR 100B	Hebron Avenue; NW Berea Avenue	W/E	SR 100	Northwest of Keystone Heights	SR 100	Keystone Heights	
CR 209		S/N	West Tocoi Road	Putnam–Clay county line south of West Tocoi	US 17	South-southeast of Green Cove Springs	former SR 209; portion from the county line to just north-northwest of Williams Park Road not indicated on FDOT county map to be part of any county road, but is signed as part of CR 209
CR 209	Haven Avenue	S/N	US 17	Green Cove Springs	US 17 / Boivin Road	North of Green Cove Springs	
CR 209	Russell Road	S/N	US 17 / SR 15	North-northwest of Green Cove Springs	CR 739 (Henley Road)	Lake Asbury	former SR 209
CR 209A		S/N	CR 209B	East of Lake Asbury	Dead end	East of Lake Asbury	
CR 209A	Moody Avenue	W/E	CR 224A (Peoria Road)	Lakeside	CR 224A (Doctors Lake Drive)	Orange Park	
CR 209B		S/N	CR 209	East of Lake Asbury	Doctor Ira Drive	East of Lake Asbury	former SR 209B
CR 214		W/E	CR 214	Bradford–Clay county line southwest of Lake Geneva	SR 100	Southeast of Lake Geneva	former SR 214
CR 214		W/E	SR 100	Lake Geneva	CR 315C	East-northeast of Lake Geneva	former SR 214; FDOT's county map indicates that CR 315C southeast of the eastern terminus is actually part of CR 316C, but it is signed as part of CR 315C.
CR 214	Georges Lake Road; Sungarden Road	W/E	S. Bellamy Road	East-northeast of Lake Geneva	US 17	Putnam–Clay county line west-southwest of West Tocoi	
CR 215	Kingsley Lake Road	S/N	SR 16	East-northeast of Kingsley Beach	SR 21	Middleburg	former SR 215
CR 217		S/N	CR 218	south of Maxville	CR 217	Clay–Duval county line in Maxville	former SR 217
CR 218		W/E	US 301 / Connecting Road	South of Maxville	SR 16 / Poling Boulevard	Penney Farms	former SR 218; portion west of CR 217 indicated on FDOT county map to not be part of any county road, but is signed as part of CR 218
CR 219		S/N	CR 219	Putnam–Clay county line east-northeast of Melrose	SR 100	South-southeast of Lake Geneva	former SR 219
CR 220	Long Bay Road	W/E	SR 21 / S. Lee Drive	Northeast of Middleburg	US 17 / CR 15A (Bald Eagle Road)	Fleming Island	former SR 220
CR 220A	Long Bay Road	S/N	CR 220 (Long Bay Road)	Northeast of Middleburg	CR 220A	Northeast of Middleburg	former SR 220A
CR 220A	Old Jennings Road	W/E	Live Oak Lane / Old Jennings Road	North of Middleburg	SR 21 (Blanding Boulevard) / Henley Road	Southwest of Lakeside	
CR 220A	Baxley Road	S/N	CR 220 / Baxley Road	Southwest of Lakeside	SR 21 / Baxley Road	Southwest of Lakeside	
CR 220A	Old Jennings Road	W/E	Dead end	Lakeside	CR 224 (College Drive)	Lakeside	Portion west of CR 220B not indicated on FDOT county map as part of any county road
CR 220B	Knight Boxx Road	S/N	CR 220	Lakeside	SR 21 (Blanding Boulevard) / Oak Lane	Lakeside	former SR 220
CR 224	College Drive	S/N	CR 220 / Plantation Drive	Doctors Inlet	SR 21 (Blanding Boulevard)	Lakeside	former SR 224 inventoried by FDOT as CR 1189
CR 224A	Peoria Road; Doctors Lake Drive	W/E	CR 224 (College Drive)	Lakeside	SR 224 (Kingsley Avenue)	Orange Park	former SR 224A inventoried by FDOT as CR 1181
CR 224B	Magnolia Road; Holly Road	S/N	Cedar Road	Lakeside	CR 224C (Cedar Road)	Lakeside	
CR 224C	Oak Road; Cedar Road; Bay Street	S/N	CR 224B (Magnolia Road)	Lakeside	CR 224A (Peoria Road / Doctors Lake Drive)	Lakeside	
CR 225		S/N	SR 16	Southeast of Lawtey	CR 225	Bradford–Clay county line south-southeast of Lawtey	former SR 225
CR 226		W/E	US 17	Southwest of Walkill	CR 209	Walkill	former SR 226
CR 315	Sharron Road	S/N	Sharron Road	East-northeast of Belmore	SR 21	North of Belmore	
CR 315	Springbank Road	S/N	Hogarth Road / Sharron Road / Saunders Road	Southwest of Green Cove Springs	SR 16 / Chesser Road	West of Green Cove Springs	former SR 315
CR 315	Springbank Road	S/N	SR 16	West of Green Cove Springs	US 17 / SR 15	North-northwest of Green Cove Springs	former SR 315
CR 315A		W/E	CR 315 / Rosemary Hill Road	West of Green Cove Springs	SR 16	West of Green Cove Springs	former SR 315
CR 315B	Mahama Bluff Road	W/E	CR 315	Northwest of Green Cove Springs	Dead end	North-northwest of Green Cove Springs	
CR 315C		S/N	CR 315	Putnam–Clay county line east of Lake Geneva	SR 21	Northeast of Keystone Heights	former SR 315; portion from Putnam County line to intersection with CR 214, east-northeast of Keystone Heights, indicated on FDOT county map to be part of CR 316C, but signed as part of CR 315C
CR 316C		S/N	CR 315	Putnam–Clay county line east of Lake Geneva	CR 214 / CR 315C	East-northeast of Keystone Heights	Portion from Putnam County line to intersection with CR 214, east-northeast of Keystone Heights, indicated on FDOT county map to be part of CR 316C, but signed as part of CR 315C
CR 352		W/E	SR 21	Northeast of Keystone Heights	Christian Camp Road	South of Mike Roess Gold Head Branch State Park northeast of Keystone Heights	former SR 352
CR 739	Henley Road	S/N	CR 218	Lake Asbury	SR 21 (Blanding Boulevard) / CR 220A (Old Jennings Road)	Southwest of Lakeside	former SR 739; portion north of CR 209, in Lake Asbury, not indicated on FDOT county map as part of CR 739, but is signed that way
CR 739B	Sandridge Road	W/E	CR 739 (Henley Road)	Lake Asbury	CR 209 (Russell Road)	East of Lake Asbury	former SR 739A
