= Florida State Road 21 =

Highway in Florida, US

State Road 21
- Blanding Boulevard
- SR 21 highlighted in red

Route information
- Maintained by FDOT
- Length: 57.573 mi (92.655 km)
- Existed: 1945–present

Major junctions
- South end: SR 20 / CR 20A near McMeekin
- SR 26 in Melrose; SR 100 in Keystone Heights; SR 23 near Middleburg; SR 224 near Orange Park; I-295 in Jacksonville
- North end: US 17 in Jacksonville

Location
- Country: United States
- State: Florida
- Counties: Putnam, Bradford, Clay, Duval

Highway system
- Florida State Highway System; Interstate; US; State; Former; Pre‑1945; Toll; Scenic
← SR 20	→ SR 22

State Road 21 (SR 21) runs mostly in a southwest-to-northeast direction in the US state of Florida from McMeekin to Jacksonville. It is also known as Blanding Boulevard for much of its length.

SR 21 is one of three routes, along with Roosevelt Boulevard (US 17) and the First Coast Expressway (SR 23), that connect Jacksonville with its surroundings west of the St. Johns River. Congestion has become a problem over the years as local government works to develop infrastructure for the growing populations of Orange Park, Middleburg and Green Cove Springs with the northern connectivity sought and thought to be achieved by drastic road widening despite the decimation of Lake Shore's prewar scale. Residents of both Clay and St. Johns counties' communities rely on Duval's economy (Jacksonville) for employment. As a result, traffic is heavy during morning and evening rush hour, especially near and on I-295. Such has spurred the creation of the Collins Road / I-295 interchange.

Blanding Boulevard was named after Albert Hazen Blanding (November 9, 1876 – December 26, 1970) who was a United States Army General. He was one of the most distinguished military figures in Florida's history.

== Route description ==
SR 21 begins at SR 20, and the western terminus of County Road 20A (CR 20A), in McMeekin in Putnam County. For the first seven miles (11 km), the road is a relatively flat two-lane rural highway heading north with occasional hills, with the only other notable intersection of importance being CR 21, a connecting spur to Marion County. North of here, the road begins to bear to the northwest, but curves to slightly back along the eastern shore of Lake Melrose. After intersecting SR 26 in Melrose, SR 21 enters Clay County briefly as it starts to move northwest and enters extreme southeastern Bradford County north of the intersection with Melrose Road, intersecting with CR 214 and CR 21B. Passing between Keystone Heights Golf and Country Club, and winding around Lake Geneva, SR 21 re-enters Clay County in Keystone Heights, acquiring the name Lakeside Avenue, and then Lawrence Boulevard. It intersects SR 100 where it makes a sharp turn to the northeast. North of Loch Lommond, SR 21 serves as the southeastern border of Camp Blanding. In this location, it also runs past Mike Roess Gold Head Branch State Park, and has a short concurrency with CR 315, after turning straight north in Belmore. West of Penney Farms, SR 21 intersects SR 16 and ceases to serve as the east side of Camp Blanding, but still remains a two-lane rural highway.

Only when the road enters Middleburg does SR 21 become a four-lane divided highway just south of the intersection of CR 215 (Kingsley Lake Road), and curves to the northeast again. From here it gains the name Blanding Boulevard from here to its northern terminus. It then crosses CR 218. Shortly after then it serves as the terminus of CR 220 (Everett Avenue), and begins a hidden concurrency with SR 21, and serves as the southern terminus of CR 220A (Long Bay Road) before CR 220 ends the concurrency at Doctors Inlet Road. SR 21 then encounters Branan Field Road, which becomes SR 23 to the north. An interchange between SR 21 and SR 23 is planned to be built slightly to the west of the current intersection as part of the First Coast Expressway. The road crosses CR 220A again at Old Jennings Road. Beyond that, it has two western termini with another suffixed route, known as CR 21B (Jefferson Avenue) in Ridgewood. In Lakeside, SR 21 serves as the northern terminus of CR 224 (College Drive), providing access to Saint Johns River Community College. CR 21B ends at SR 21 again along Cleveland Avenue. Near Orange Park, the road curves straight north again where SR 224 serves as the last major intersection before entering Jacksonville, although SR 21 passes through one more community known as Meadowbrook Terrace, the home of the Orange Park Mall. North of the Clay–Duval county line, SR 21 enters Jacksonville, and then approaches the interchange with I-295, which was recently redesigned to accommodate ramps to Collins Road, a street that intersects with SR 21 north of the interchange.

Within the rest of Jacksonville, the road intersects state highways such as SR 134 (103rd Street), and later serves as the eastern terminus of SR 208 (Wilson Boulevard), where SR 21 has a wide median as opposed to a center turn lane. Two blocks north of SR 208, Blanding Boulevard crosses over the Cedar River, a tributary of the Ortega River, and enters Lake Shore. Two blocks north of the bridge, the road intersects with the southern terminus of SR 111 (Cassat Avenue). SR 21 heads northeast for several blocks until its intersection with the east-west connector San Juan Avenue SR 128.

Prior to SR 21's northern terminus, Blanding continues to the northeast for several more blocks north of San Juan Avenue until it straightens to the north again and crosses St. Johns Avenue. Blanding Boulevard has a full intersection with Park Street, with eastbound Park Street providing access to US 17 south. North of Park Street, Blanding becomes a limited access connecting overpass crossing over Hamilton Street, a double tracked railroad, and has an interchange with US 17 (Roosevelt Boulevard) northbound at the edge of Florida State College at Jacksonville's Kent Campus, also with access from US 17 Roosevelt Boulevard southbound to SR 21 southbound. SR 21 ends at a second intersection with Park Street and an entrance to Kent campus at the eastern end of the interchange.

== Major intersections ==
County	Location	mi	km	Destinations	Notes
Putnam	McMeekin	0.000	0.000	SR 20 / CR 20A east – Interlachen, Hawthorne	
Putnam	Melrose	7.180	11.555	SR 26 – Gainesville, Putnam Hall, Historic District	
Clay	No major junctions				
Bradford		10.260	16.512	CR 214 east	
Bradford		10.447	16.813	CR 21B north (Southeast 27th Street)	
Clay	Keystone Heights	14.026	22.573	SR 100 – Starke, Palatka	
Clay		17.194	27.671	CR 352 east (Spring Lake Road)	
Clay	Belmore	22.941	36.920	CR 315C south	
Clay	Belmore	26.127	42.047	CR 315 north (Sharron Road) – Belmore State Forest Ates Creek Tract	
Clay		30.625	49.286	SR 16 – Penney Farms, Camp Blanding, Starke	
Clay	Middleburg	34.734	55.899	CR 215 south – Camp Blanding, Starke	
Clay	Middleburg	36.930	59.433	CR 218 – Ravines, Penney Farms, Jennings State Forest	
Clay	Middleburg	37.505	60.358	CR 220 west (Everett Avenue)	
Clay	Middleburg	38.181	61.446	CR 220 east (Long Bay Road)	
Clay	Middleburg	39.020	62.797	CR 220 west	
Clay	Middleburg	39.080	62.893	CR 220 east	
Clay	Middleburg	40.899	65.821	SR 23 (First Coast Expressway) to I-10 / US 17 – Jacksonville, Lake City, Green Cove Springs, Palatka	
Clay	Middleburg	42.199	67.913	CR 209 south / CR 220A west (Old Jennings Road) – Jennings State Forest	
Clay	Lakeside	43.345	69.757	CR 220B south (Knight Boxx Road)	
Clay	Lakeside	44.678	71.902	CR 21B north (Taylor Avenue)	
Clay	Lakeside	45.078	72.546	CR 224 south (College Drive)	
Clay	Bellair-Meadowbrook Terrace	47.699	76.764	SR 224 east (Kingsley Avenue)	
Duval	Jacksonville	50.06	80.56	I-295 (SR 9A) – Savannah, St. Augustine	Exit 12 (I-295)
Duval	Jacksonville	53.694	86.412	SR 134 (103rd Street) to I-295	
Duval	Jacksonville	55.793	89.790	SR 111 (Cassat Avenue) to I-10	
Duval	Jacksonville	56.316	90.632	SR 128 (San Juan Avenue)	
Duval	Jacksonville	57.002	91.736	To US 17 south / Park Street	
Duval	Jacksonville	57.37	92.33	US 17 north (Roosevelt Boulevard / SR 15)	interchange
Duval	Jacksonville	57.573	92.655	Park Street - FSCJ Kent Campus	
1.000 mi = 1.609 km; 1.000 km = 0.621 mi

== Related routes ==
=== County Road 21 in Marion and Putnam counties ===
County Road 21
- Location: Orange Springs – McMeekin

County Road 21 (CR 21) is a bi-county road that begins in Orange Springs in Marion County. Rather than a true extension of SR 21, the road is a connecting spur. CR 21 begins at CR 315 in Orange Springs, and immediately crosses the Marion–Putnam county line, where it is named Baden Powell Road. The first major intersection it encounters is CR 20A in Johnson, which runs east–west and ends at the southern terminus of SR 21 to the west. This county road is related to a state road that CR 21 later encounters north of here, specifically SR 20 in Whiteville, which is east of the southern terminus of SR 21. The road continues north and then makes a sharp left turn becoming an east–west road before terminating at SR 21 between McMeekin and Melrose.

=== County Road 21B in Bradford County ===
County Road 21B
- Location: Keystone Heights – Theressa

County Road 21B (CR 21B) is a suffixed route of SR 21 on the Bradford County side of Keystone Heights. It begins at SR 21 and winds along the eastern shores of the Santa Fe Lakes, and then the south side of the Santa Fe Swamp before turning north and finally terminating at SR 100 near Theressa.

=== County Road 21A in Clay County ===
County Road 21A
- Location: Middleburg

County Road 21A (CR 21A) is a suffixed county route of SR 21 that is officially recognized by FDOT as two different streets in Middleburg, Florida. The first of which is Forman Circle, a loop street on the west side of SR 21, the north end of which runs parallel to Peppergrass Street. The other is Black Creek Drive, which has no connection to SR 21 and begins at CR 218, running south until it reaches a dead end along the South Fork of Black Creek.

=== County Road 21B in Clay County ===
County Road 21B
- Location: Lakeside

County Road 21B (CR 21B) is another county suffixed alternative route of SR 21. It begins at SR 21 as Taylor Avenue heading northwest, then turns right onto Washington Avenue a few blocks to the north and runs parallel to SR 21, running northeast through a segment of the community once known as Ridgewood. Later it makes another turn to the right onto Cleveland Avenue and heads southeast until finally terminating at SR 21 near Lakeside.
