= Green Cove Springs and Melrose Railroad =

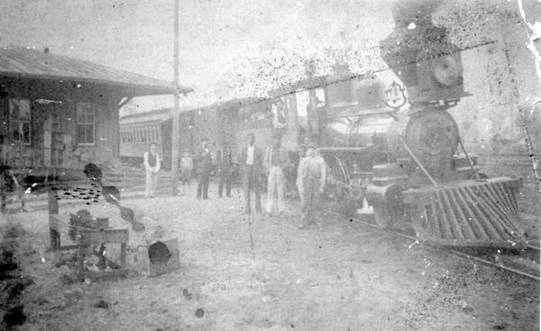

Overview
- Other name(s): South-Western Railroad; Western Railway of Florida
- Status: Defunct
- Locale: Clay County, Florida & Putnam County, Florida
- Termini: Green Cove Springs, Florida; Melrose, Florida

Service
- Type: Common carrier / forest railway

History
- Commenced: 1881
- Opened: 1883
- Completed: 1890
- Closed: 1899

Technical
- Line length: 33.5 mi (53.9 km)
- Track gauge: 3 ft 0 in (914 mm)

The Green Cove Springs and Melrose Railroad was a 3 ft (914 mm) narrow gauge common carrier and logging railroad that operated between 1881 and 1899. Its core route ran for 33.5 miles in a southwesterly direction from the city of Green Cove Springs, Florida, United States, to the lakeside town of Melrose.

== History ==
The company was incorporated under Florida state law and approved on February 28, 1881, with construction commencing a short time later. In March 1883, the first section of the route from Green Cove Springs to the community of Sharon was opened. Further construction proceeded gradually, with the railroad finally reaching Melrose in 1890.

During the mid-1880s, the railroad was faced with financial troubles and the company underwent reorganization twice, becoming the Green Cove Springs & Midland Railway in 1885 and then Western Railway of Florida a year later. In 1892, the railroad was sold and the company reorganized for a third and final time to South-Western Railroad.

=== Land grants ===
Once construction commenced, the railroad was promised land grants from the state of Florida.

- Florida state law chapter 3495, approved March 2, 1883, enlarged the area from which they could choose land grants. At the time, their route had been adopted, and most of the land along the route had already been sold off.
- Florida state law chapter 3644, approved February 11, 1885, further enlarged the area for land grants, and extended the deadline to January 1, 1886.
- Florida state law chapter 3796, approved June 7, 1887, extended the deadline for land grants to July 1, 1888.

=== Closure ===
The beginning of the end came during the late 1890s following a Great Freeze which devastated the local economy and resulted in a loss of passenger and freight traffic. The railroad held on for a few more years to continue serving the logging industry before finally shutting down in 1899.

Portions of the rail bed can still be seen in some places including "Tram Road", an unpaved footpath at Gold Head Branch State Park which follows the old right of way for about a mile or so. In addition, part of the railroad's route through Green Cove Springs is today Melrose Avenue.
