= Oakleaf Plantation, Florida =

Census Designated Place in Florida, United States

Oakleaf Plantation
- Planned community Census-Designated Place
- Location within Florida
- Coordinates: 30°10′N 81°50′W
- Country: United States
- Counties: Clay

Area
  - Total: 16.58 sq mi (42.94 km^{2})
  - Land: 16.57 sq mi (42.92 km^{2})

Population (2020)
  - Total: 31,034
  - Density: 1,872.7/sq mi (723.07/km^{2})
- Time zone: Eastern (EST)
  - Summer (DST): EDT
- GNIS ID: 2583371
- Website: oakleafresidents.com

Oakleaf Plantation is a 6,400-acre planned community in the Jacksonville, Florida Metropolitan Statistical Area located in unincorporated Clay County and partially within the Jacksonville city limits (Duval County). The Clay County portion of the community was defined as the Oakleaf Plantation Census-Designated Place (CDP) in advance of the 2010 census. The population was 31,034 at the 2020 census, up from 20,315 in 2010.

== History ==
The Oakleaf Plantation was established in 2002 and was developed by the Hutson Companies.

== Location ==
Oakleaf Plantation is located in both Clay County and Duval County; it is situated along the First Coast Expressway. Within Duval County, Oakleaf Plantation consists of mixed used areas. Argyle Forest Blvd runs east-west to Florida State Road 21 (Blanding Blvd). The Clay County section is composed of Oakleaf Village, located on the eastern side of the First Coast Expressway, while Oakleaf Plantation is located along the western side of the First Coast Expressway. The various areas within Oakleaf Plantation are Eagle Landing, Plantation Oaks and Forest Hammock.

The U.S. Navy's Branan Field was formerly located in the east part of the community, centered on Oakleaf Village Elementary School.

== Demographics ==
Historical population
Census	Pop.	Note	%±
2010	20,315		—
2020	31,034		52.8%
U.S. Decennial Census

Oakleaf Plantation first appeared as a census designated place in the 2010 U.S. census.

=== 2020 census ===
As of the 2020 census, Oakleaf Plantation had a population of 31,034. The median age was 33.6 years. 6.0% of residents were under the age of 5, 31.3% were under the age of 18, and 7.7% were 65 years of age or older. For every 100 females there were 92.3 males, and for every 100 females age 18 and over there were 87.2 males age 18 and over.

There were 9,602 households in Oakleaf Plantation, of which 53.3% had children under the age of 18 living in them. Of all households, 60.8% were married-couple households, 11.2% were households with a male householder and no spouse or partner present, and 21.9% were households with a female householder and no spouse or partner present. About 12.5% of all households were made up of individuals and 3.3% had someone living alone who was 65 years of age or older.

There were 10,079 housing units, of which 4.7% were vacant. The homeowner vacancy rate was 2.4% and the rental vacancy rate was 7.2%.

96.6% of residents lived in urban areas, while 3.4% lived in rural areas.

Racial composition as of the 2020 census
Race	Number	Percent
White	13,550	43.7%
Black or African American	9,670	31.2%
American Indian and Alaska Native	116	0.4%
Asian	2,137	6.9%
Native Hawaiian and Other Pacific Islander	61	0.2%
Some other race	1,595	5.1%
Two or more races	3,905	12.6%
Hispanic or Latino (of any race)	4,996	16.1%

=== Education, income, and poverty ===
The median household income was $102,791. 8.2% of the population lived below the poverty threshold, including 10.4% of those under 18 and 8.3% of those over 65. 94.8% of the population 25 years and older had a high school degree or equivalent or higher and 33.2% of that same population had a bachelor's degree or higher. 16.3% of the population were veterans.

== Education ==
Oakleaf Village Elementary (K-6) serves all residents in Oakleaf Village; Plantation Oaks Elementary and Discovery Oaks Elementary serve K-6 in Oakleaf Plantation. Oakleaf Junior High (7-8) and Oakleaf High School (9-12) serve all of Oakleaf Plantation within the Clay County School District.

== Amenities ==
The Oakleaf has two athletic centers that include two water parks and a Junior Olympic-sized pool. There is a championship golf course developed by East-West Partners and 15 miles of pedestrian and bicycle pathways.
