= Banana, Florida =

Unincorporated community in Florida, U.S.

Coordinates: 29.689°N 82.039°W

Banana is an unincorporated community in Putnam County, Florida, located one mile (1.6 km) south of Melrose on State Road 21.

== History ==
In 1855, Dr. George Washington Alexander McRae bought the grist mill. The grist mill site is located where the Old Orange Springs, Starke Highway crossed Etoniah Creek. Dr. McRae was the Postmaster at Banana, owned a mercantile store, plantation and was the area doctor. He was partial owner of the Etoniah Canal and Drainage Company. Fremont and Zee Tolles donated the remains of the Banana, FL settlement along Etoniah Creek to the Historic Melrose Association. Plans are underway to establish access to the old mill and a picnic area.
