= Drew Bundini Brown =

American actor

- Born: Drew Bundini Brown, Jr. March 21, 1928; Midway, Florida, US
- Died: September 24, 1987 (aged 59); Los Angeles County, California, US
- Occupations: athletic trainer, boxing cornerman, valet, actor
- Spouse: Rhoda Palestine (divorced)
- Children: 2

Drew Bundini Brown (March 21, 1928 – September 24, 1987) was an American assistant trainer and cornerman of heavyweight champion boxer Muhammad Ali.

== Early life ==
Brown, who was born in Midway, Florida, and raised in nearby Sanford, dropped out of junior high school after the eighth grade. The strapping young Brown, who had matured rapidly during puberty, was able to lie about his age and join the United States Navy as a Messboy at age 13. Discharged two years later, he found employment in the United States Merchant Marine, and spent 12 years traveling the world on the high seas.

== Career ==
After seven years with Sugar Ray Robinson, widely recognized as one of the best boxers of all time, Brown joined Muhammad Ali's boxing team as a cornerman in 1963. and remained with him throughout his career. (Later he also became a cornerman for James "Quick" Tillis).

Brown was one of Ali's speech writers. He wrote certain poems, including that which coined Ali's famous and oft quoted: “Float like a butterfly, sting like a bee, rumble, young man, rumble.” Ali used the poem to taunt Sonny Liston at the press conference prior to his February 25, 1964, victory over the WBA and WBC champion to claim both titles.

== Death ==
Brown died on 24 September 1987 in Los Angeles County, California, at the age of 59 from medical complications of injuries sustained in a previous car accident. He suffered a pinched nerve in his spine in the crash and subsequently had a serious fall at home, from which he never recovered. He was visited by Ali on his deathbed.

== Personal life ==
Brown had one brother, Elbert James Brown. In the early 1950s, while living in Harlem, New York City, Brown married Rhoda Palestine, whose family was Russian-Jewish. Due to this relationship, Brown later converted to Reform Judaism. They married at a time when interracial relationships and marriages were considered by many as taboo, and had one son, Drew Brown III (born January 20, 1955, in Harlem).

According to the autobiography of singer Ruth Brown (no relation), he was also the true father of her son Ronald David Jackson (“Ronnie”), though he was unaware of this during the boy's childhood.

His son Drew III joined the United States Navy and became a Medium Attack Bomber pilot flying the A-6 Intruder. After retiring from the Navy, he wrote a bestselling book, You Gotta Believe, and became a nationally known speaker.

== Portrayals in film ==
He was played by the actor Bernie Mac in the film Don King: Only in America, by Jamie Foxx in the film Ali, by Lawrence Gilliard Jr. in One Night In Miami, and by Reno Wilson in The Greatest (2026 TV series).

== Filmography ==
=== As actor ===
- Shaft (1971) .... Willy
- Shaft's Big Score! (1972) .... Willy
- Aaron Loves Angela (1975) .... Referee
- The Color Purple (1985) .... Jook Joint Patron
- Penitentiary III (1987) .... Sugg / Inmate #2 (final film role)

=== As self ===
- Am laufenden Band (1976, 1 TV episode, dated 22 May 1976) .... Himself
- The Greatest (1977) .... Himself
- Muhammad and Larry (1980) .... Himself
- Doin' Time (1985) .... Himself (special appearance)
- When We Were Kings (1996) .... Himself (uncredited)

=== Archive footage ===
- A.K.A. Cassius Clay (1970) .... Himself
- Beat This!: A Hip hop History (1984, TV) .... Himself
- Muhammad Ali (docuseries), Episode 1: "Round One: The Greatest (1942–1964)" (2021, TV) .... Himself
