= Florida State Road 23 =

Highway in Florida, US

State Road 23
- First Coast Expressway
- Completed section of SR 23 highlighted in red

Route information
- Maintained by Florida's Turnpike Enterprise
- Length: 36.0 mi (57.9 km)

Major junctions
- South end: SR 16 in Green Cove Springs
- US 17 near Green Cove Springs
- North end: I-10 / US 90 in Jacksonville

Location
- Country: United States
- State: Florida
- Counties: Clay, Duval

Highway system
- Florida State Highway System; Interstate; US; State; Former; Pre‑1945; Toll; Scenic
← US 23	→ SR 24

State Road 23 (SR 23), also known as the First Coast Expressway, and in part the Cecil Commerce Center Parkway, is a controlled-access toll road serving as an outer bypass around the southwest quadrant of Jacksonville, Florida. As of 2025, the first and second phases have been built, linking Interstate 10 (I-10) near Whitehouse with US 17 in the Green Cove Springs area.

The ultimate plan is for a 46.5-mile (74.8 km) four-lane controlled-access, electronically-tolled highway between I-10 and I-95. The total investment for the entire highway is estimated at $2 billion. Construction of the final section began in 2024 and is expected to be completed by 2032. It extends from near Green Cove Springs, crosses the St. Johns River, then continues east through fast-growing northern St. Johns County to a point approximately 3.5 miles (5.6 km) north of the World Golf Village interchange along I-95.

== Route description ==
The First Coast Expressway begins at an interchange with US Highway 90 (US 90, Beaver Street). Shortly after, the expressway heads southbound towards a cloverstack interchange with I-10. Following the major interchange, the freeway widens to four lanes and continues south towards interchanges with POW-MIA Memorial Highway and SR 134 (103rd Street), providing access to the nearby Cecil Field. The highway continues through the suburban outskirts of Jacksonville before crossing into Clay County following the interchange with Argyle Forest Boulevard/Oakleaf Plantation Parkway. The expressway follows a pair of frontage roads from the second interchange with Oakleaf Plantation until the half-diamond interchange with Old Jennings Road. The highway continues for roughly a mile (1.6 km), passing by St. Vincent's Hospital, reaching SR 21 (Blanding Boulevard) near Middleburg. The highway curves southeast-east around the Black Creek Ravines Conservation Area and Lake Asbury, crossing over Black Creek before reaching a diverging diamond interchange with CR 739. There, the highway curves south again. Continuing south, the highway has another diverging diamond interchange with Cathedral Oak Parkway, and turning southeast, has another diverging diamond interchange with SR 16 west of Green Cove Springs. The highway continues southeast before curving northeast and reaching a diamond interchange US 17 south of Green Cove Springs. The highway continues along the southeast side of Reynolds Airpark Airport before currently terminating at a temporary at-grade intersection with SR 16 (Leonard C. Taylor Parkway) right on the eastern edge of Green Cove Springs, just west of the Shands Bridge.

== History ==
External videos
- SR 23 Aerial video (YouTube) – View of the completed sections and sections under construction from the St. Johns River to I-10 as of early 2025.

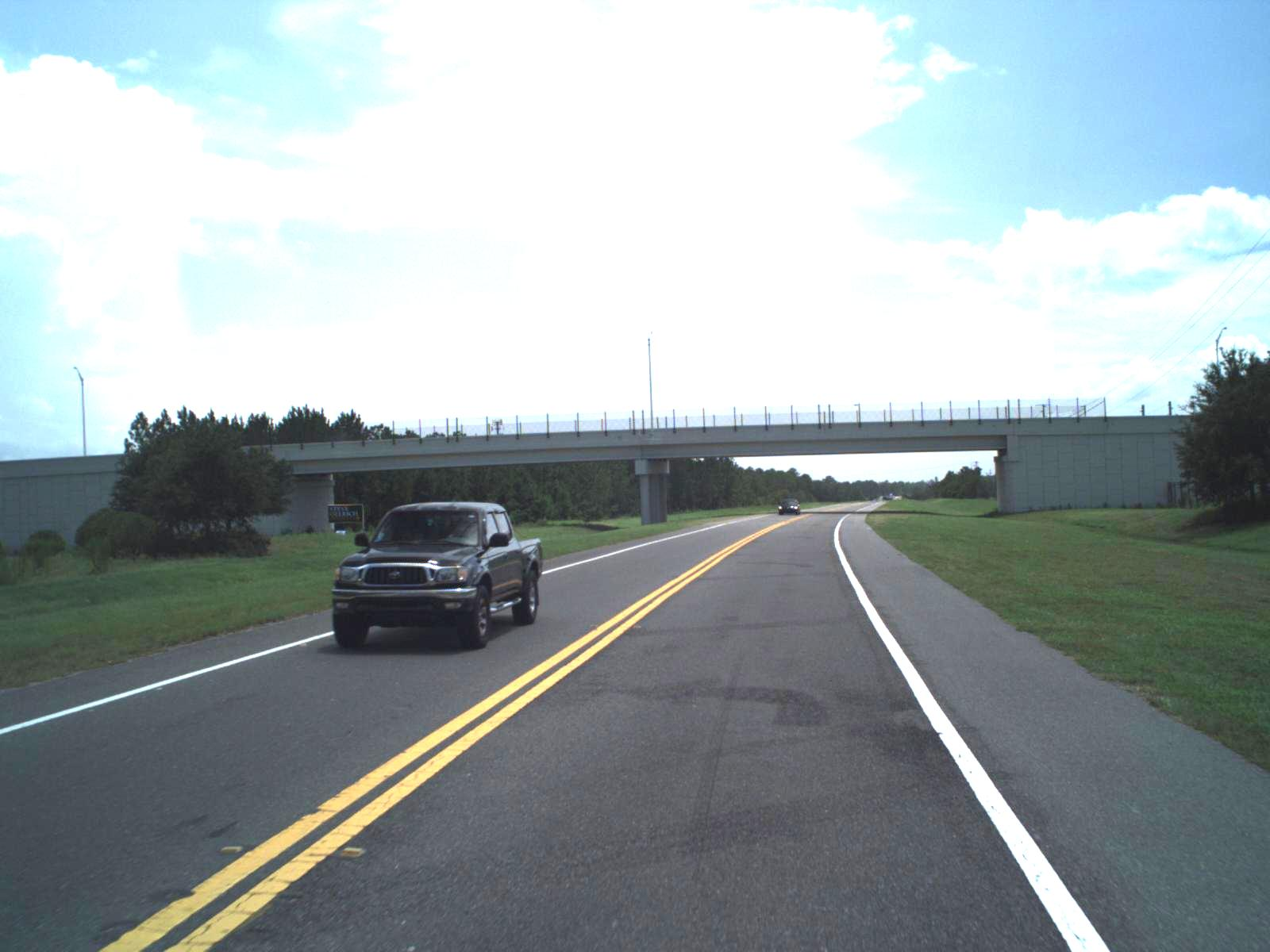
Bridge carrying Plantation Oaks Boulevard over the future expressway in Oakleaf Plantation, built 2010

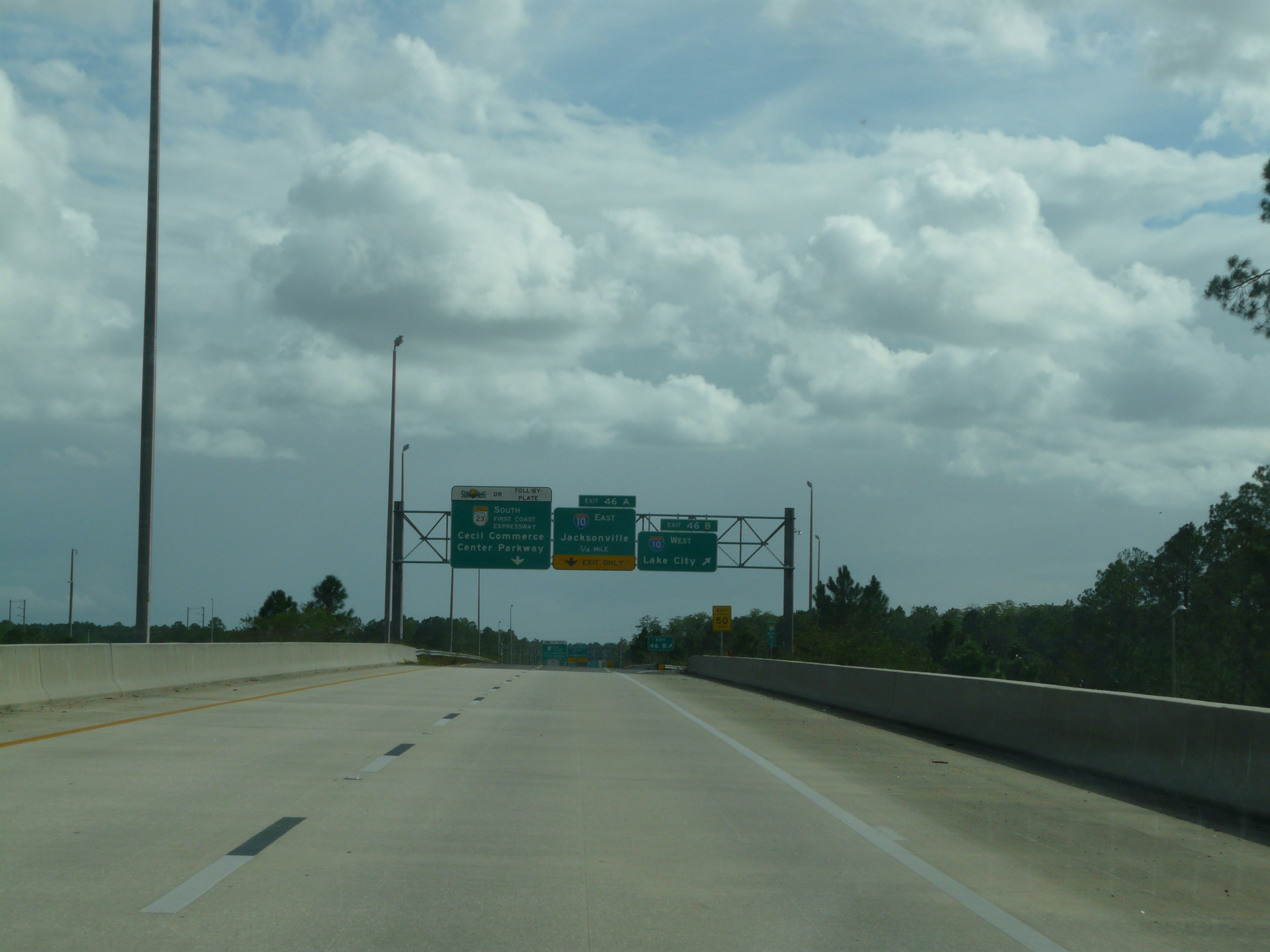
Southbound at the first exit at Interstate 10

The plans for connecting I-10 to SR 21 (Blanding Blvd) date back to 1979. SR 23 was originally planned as a toll road by Florida's Turnpike Enterprise to meet those plans, but those plans fell through in 1997.

The Jacksonville Transportation Authority and Clay County worked together to connect Branan Field Road in Clay County and Chaffee Road in Duval County. By 2003, the Duval County section was open, and connected south to Branan Field Road in Clay County. By late 2004, the Clay County section was added. On August 9, 2025, the second phase in Clay County opened, extending the route from SR 21 near Middleburg to US 17 south of Green Cove Springs. On June 29, 2026, the final segment of the second phase opened, extending the route from US 17 south of Green Cove Springs to SR 16 on the eastern edge of Green Cove Springs. The project was formerly known as the First Coast Outer Beltway and the Branan Field-Chaffee Expressway, but its current name is the First Coast Expressway.

== Future ==
The partial outer beltway when finished will contain 17 interchanges and a new bridge across the St. Johns River in place of the current two-lane Shands Bridge.

=== Funding ===
Funding for the $1.8 billion project will be competitively bid as a public-private partnership (PPP) opportunity for private sector businesses. By using a PPP and innovative contracting solutions, the project will be built years earlier than with traditional contracting methods. The awarded contractor(s) will serve as the concessionaire to design, build, finance, operate and maintain the beltway. The Florida Department of Transportation (FDOT) is currently engaging private contractors in a competitive bidding process. The I-595 Corridor Express PPP with I-595 Express LLC was the first of its kind in Florida, opening years ahead of schedule. The beltway is the one of largest public infrastructure projects to be undertaken in Northeast Florida.

In early 2011, FDOT abandoned the plan to find a private company to build the entire 46.6-mile (75.0 km) beltway and just focus on building the 15 mile section between I-10 and SR 21 (Blanding Boulevard). This section is partly built and would need flyovers built and widening done for the expressway to be complete. It is expected to cost around $291 million and would be a tollway.

In August 2011, FDOT announced that the Florida's Turnpike Enterprise will be taking on the $291 million project of turning the 15-mile (24 km) stretch into a tollway. Construction started on September 10, 2012, and was completed in 2017.

Construction on the second phase of the expressway, from SR 21 (Blanding Boulevard) to Green Cove Springs, started in October 2019 and was completed in June 2026. The third and final phase of the project, which includes replacement of the Shands Bridge, started in May 2023 and will be completed in 2031. Bridge construction started in 2024. Construction on the segment between County Road 16A (CR 16A) to St. Johns Parkway (CR 2209) is expected to start in early 2025, and from St. John's Parkway to I-95 in late 2025.

=== Tolling ===
All tolls are electronic and compatible with SunPass used in other parts of the state with no toll booths. There is a free section between US 90 and POW-MIA Memorial Parkway which helps promote growth in the Cecil Commerce Center, and the future Shands Bridge crossing the St. Johns River will be free as well.

== Exit list ==
Tolls are collected between each exit south of exit 42.

County	Location	mi	km	Exit	Destinations	Notes
St. Johns		0.0	0.0	1	I-95 – Jacksonville, Daytona Beach	Future interchange and future southern terminus; I-95 future exit 326
St. Johns	SilverLeaf Plantation	2.5	4.0	2	CR 2209 (St. Johns Parkway)	Future planned interchange
St. Johns		6.9	11.1	7	To CR 16A / CR 210 / CR 244 (Longleaf Pine Parkway)	Future planned interchange
St. Johns River		9.5	15.3	Shands Bridge		
Clay	Green Cove Springs	10.6	17.1	11	SR 16 – Green Cove Springs	Current southern terminus
Clay	Green Cove Springs	12.5	20.1	Green Cove Toll Gantry		
Clay		13.8	22.2	13	US 17 – Green Cove Springs, Palatka	
Clay	Pass Station	20.0	32.2	20	SR 16 – Green Cove Springs, Penney Farms	Diverging diamond interchange; northbound exit and southbound entrance tolled
Clay	Lake Asbury	23.0	37.0	23	CR 216 (Cathedral Oak Parkway)	Diverging diamond interchange; northbound exit and southbound entrance tolled
Clay	Lake Asbury	24.0	38.6	Sandridge Toll Gantry		
Clay	Lake Asbury	27.6	44.4	28	CR 739 (Henley Road)	Diverging diamond interchange; southbound exit and northbound entrance tolled
Clay		30.9	49.7	31	SR 21 (Blanding Boulevard) – Middleburg, Orange Park	
Clay		32.1	51.7	32	CR 220A (Old Jennings Road)	Southbound exit and northbound entrance; southern terminus of frontage roads
Clay		33.0	53.1	Trail Ridge Toll Gantry		
Clay	Oakleaf Plantation	34.5	55.5	35	Oakleaf Plantation Parkway / Discovery Drive / Challenger Drive	Partial diverging diamond interchange; northern terminus of frontage roads
Clay	Oakleaf Plantation	35.4	57.0		Plantation Oaks Boulevard	Former at-grade intersection
Clay	Oakleaf Plantation	36.0	57.9	Plantation Toll Gantry		
Duval	Jacksonville	37.1	59.7	37	Argyle Forest Boulevard / Oakleaf Plantation Parkway	Single point urban interchange
Duval	Jacksonville	38.0	61.2	Argyle Toll Gantry		
Duval	Jacksonville	40.7	65.5	41	SR 134 (103rd Street)	
Duval	Jacksonville	40.9	65.8		Chaffee Road (CR 115C north)	Southern terminus of CR 115C
Duval	Jacksonville	42.0	67.6	Normandy Toll Gantry		
Duval	Jacksonville	42.1	67.8	42	SR 228 (Normandy Boulevard)	
Duval	Jacksonville	43.0	69.2	POW-MIA Parkway Toll Gantry		
Duval	Jacksonville	43.5	70.0	44	POW-MIA Memorial Parkway	
Duval	Jacksonville	45.6	73.4	46	I-10 to I-295 / I-95 – Jacksonville, Lake City	I-10 exit 350, signed as exits 46A (east) and 46B (west)
Duval	Jacksonville	46.6	75.0		US 90 – Baldwin, Whitehouse	Current northern terminus
1.000 mi = 1.609 km; 1.000 km = 0.621 mi: Closed/former; Electronic toll collection; Incomplete access; Unopened
