= Trinity Episcopal Church (Melrose, Florida) =

- Trinity Episcopal Church; Melrose, Florida
- U.S. Historic district – Contributing property
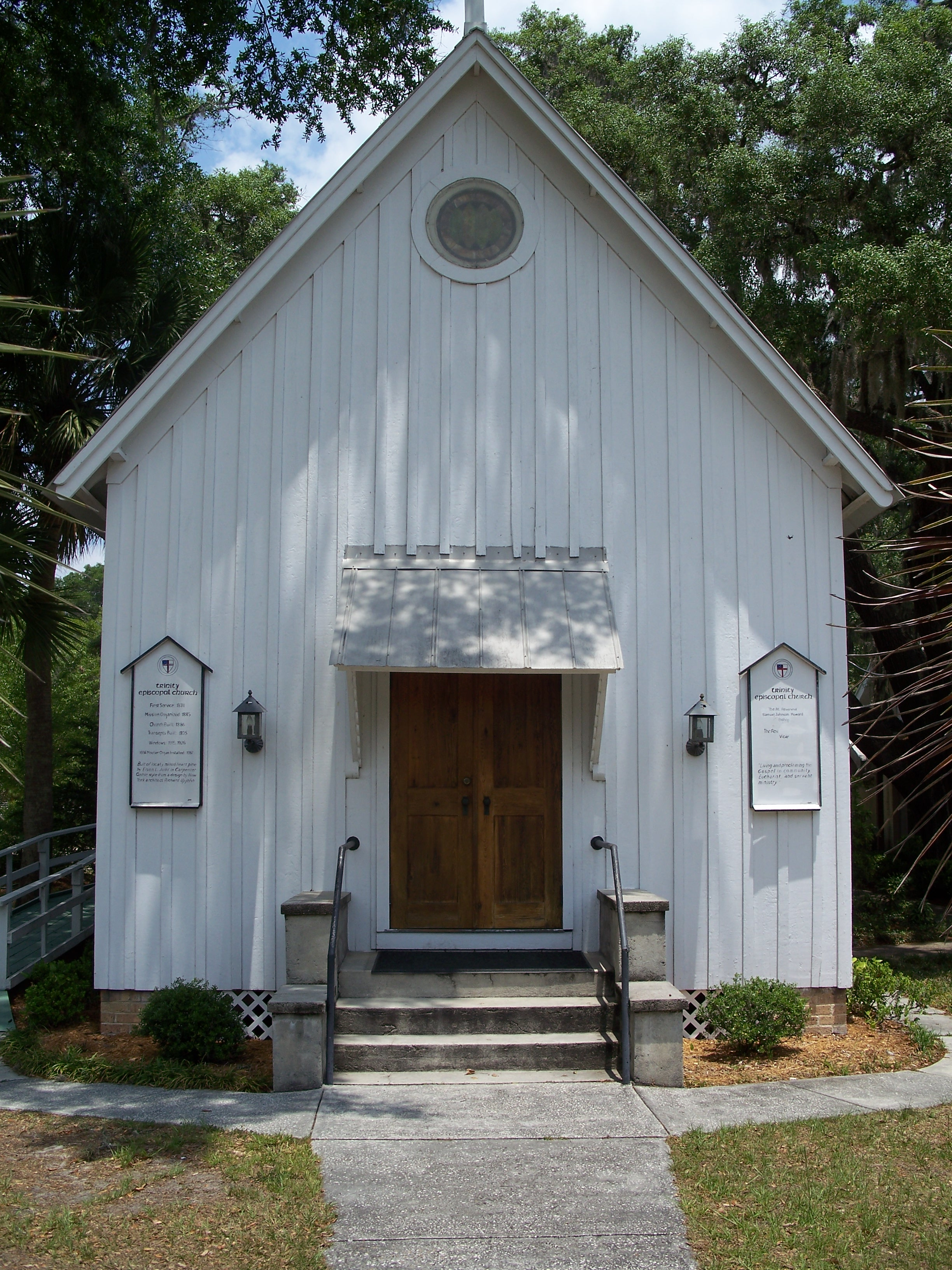
- Trinity Episcopal Church front
- Location: 204 State Road 26; Melrose, Alachua County, Florida, USA
- Coordinates: 29°42′37″N 82°2′25″W
- Built: 1885-1886
- Architectural style: Carpenter Gothic

Trinity Episcopal Church is an historic Carpenter Gothic Episcopal church located at 204 State Road 26, in the Alachua County portion of Melrose, Florida in the United States. It is a contributing property in the Melrose Historic District.

== History ==
The history of the church began in 1881 when the first Episcopal service was held in Melrose. In April 1886 Trinity was organized as a mission by Bishop John Freeman Young of the Episcopal Diocese of Florida. Between 1885 and 1886 the 20 x 40 foot church was constructed by E. L. Judd, a local carpenter, who followed a design based on the work of architect Richard Upjohn. Bishop Young had known Upjohn when he was assistant rector of Trinity Church, New York and was a proponent of using Carpenter Gothic in church construction. Except for its glass windows and brick foundation piers and chimney, the building was built entirely of local pine. The siding is board and batten with both inside and outside battens. The chimney was removed 1887 in order to install a pipe organ and to provide room for a sanctuary and a sacristy.

== Current use ==
Trinity Episcopal Church has functioned continually as a place of worship since its founding. It was a Mission Church in the Diocese of Florida until January 31, 2010, when it was received by The Diocesan Convention as a Parish Church. The Church called its first full-time priest in the spring of 2008, and the Reverend Dr. Jeffrey A. Mackey began as Vicar on July 1, 2008. Upon receiving Parish status, the Bishop of Florida, the Rt. Rev. Samuel Johnson Howard, named Father Mackey as Rector of the Parish.

== Gallery ==
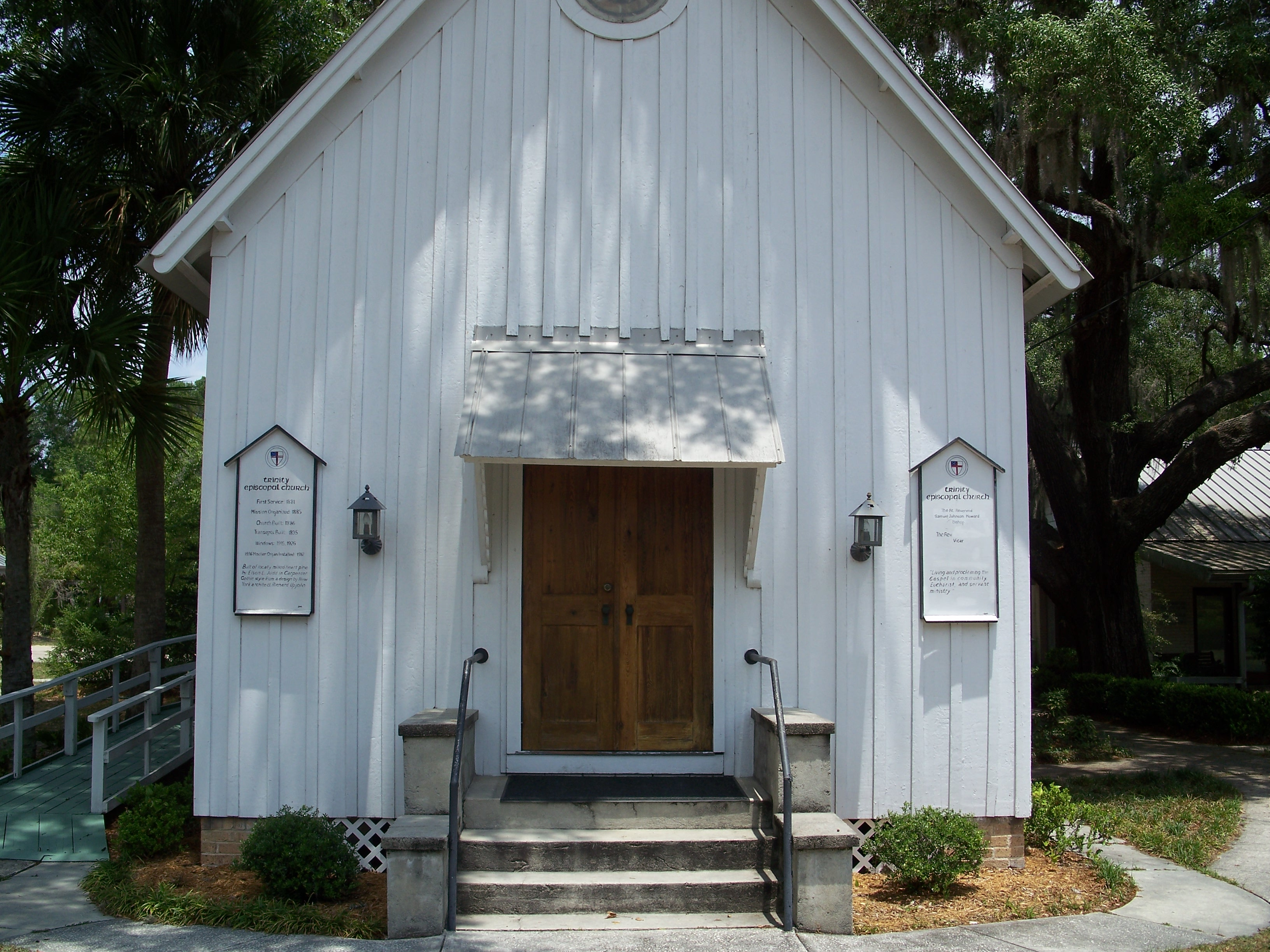
Front detail

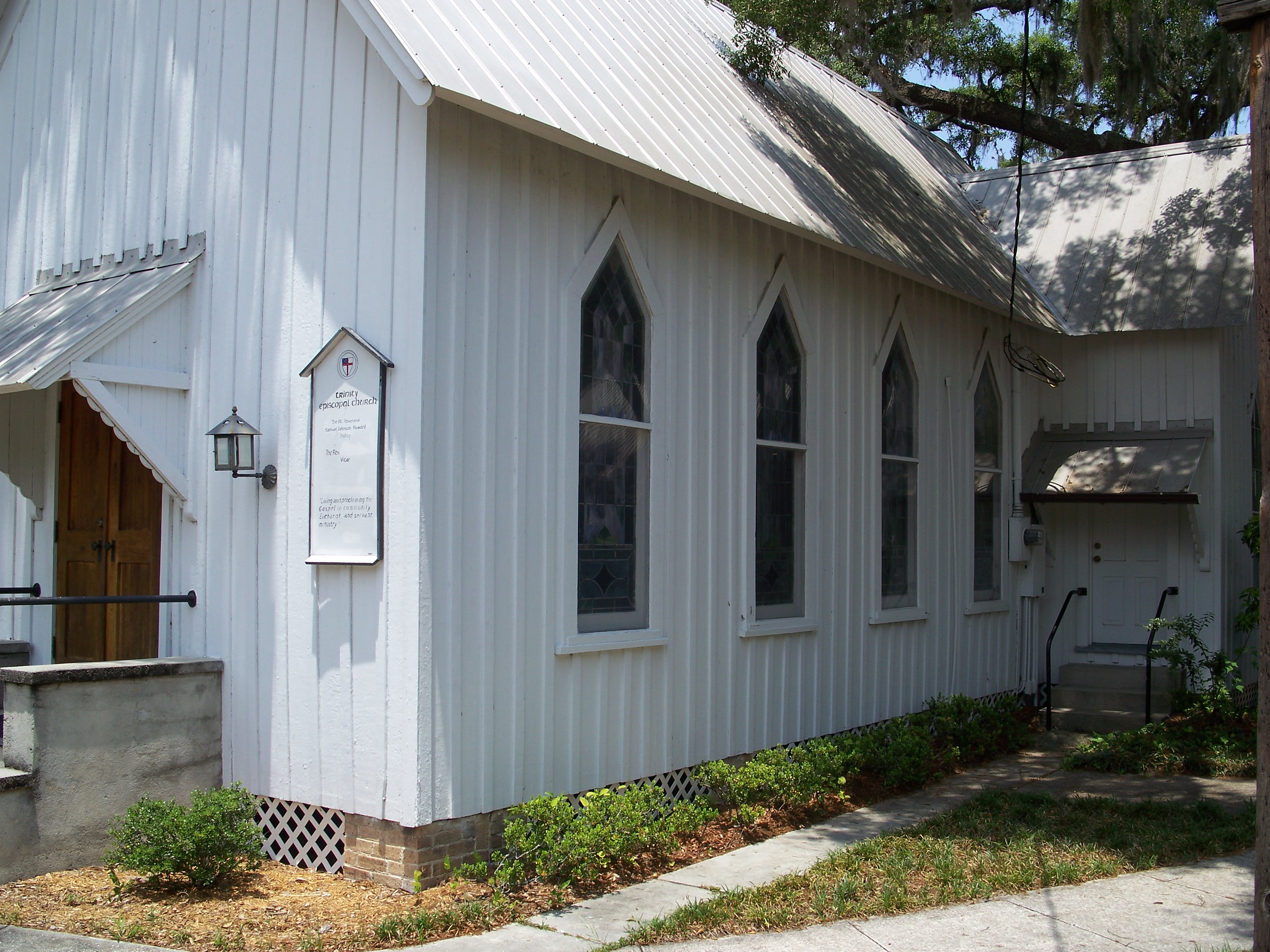
Side detail

== See also ==
- Melrose Historic District
- Trinity Episcopal Church (disambiguation)
