= Bellair-Meadowbrook Terrace, Florida =

- Census-designated place
- Location in Clay County and the state of Florida
- Coordinates: 30°10′45″N 81°44′50″W
- Country: United States
- State: Florida
- County: Clay

Area
  - Total: 4.17 sq mi (10.79 km^{2})
  - Land: 4.10 sq mi (10.63 km^{2})
  - Water: 0.066 sq mi (0.17 km^{2})
- Elevation: 62 ft (19 m)

Population (2020)
  - Total: 14,482
  - Density: 3,530.0/sq mi (1,362.94/km^{2})
- Time zone: UTC-5 (Eastern (EST))
  - Summer (DST): UTC-4 (EDT)
- ZIP code: 32073
- Area code(s): 904, 324
- GNIS ID: 2402676

Bellair-Meadowbrook Terrace is an unincorporated suburb west of Orange Park, Florida and census-designated place (CDP) in Clay County, Florida, United States. The population was 14,482 at the 2020 census, up from 13,343 at the 2010 census. It is part of the Jacksonville, Florida Metropolitan Statistical Area.

== Geography ==
Bellair-Meadowbrook Terrace is located in northeastern Clay County at 30°10′38″N 81°44′30″W (30.177189, -81.741776), just south of the Ortega River and east of Crosby Sanctuary, along the border with Duval County (the city of Jacksonville). To the east and partially to the south is the town of Orange Park. Also to the south, beyond Kingsley Avenue (State Road 224) is the CDP of Lakeside. Bellair-Meadowbrook Terrace is the home of the Orange Park Mall.

According to the United States Census Bureau, the CDP has a total area of 4.2 square miles (11.0 km^{2}), of which 4.2 square miles (10.9 km^{2}) is land and 0.077 square miles (0.2 km^{2}), or 1.48%, is water.

=== Neighborhoods ===
The Bellair-Meadowbrook Terrace CDP consists of over a dozen neighborhoods, including:

- Bellair - a large subdivision directly south of Meadowbrook. It mostly consists of single-family housing developments east of Blanding Boulevard. Bellair West is the subdivision on the west side of Blanding.
- Cedar Bend
- Grove Park / Grove Park Village
- Holly Cove
- Loch Rane / Loch Rane Estates
- Meadowbrook - short for Meadowbrook Terrace or North Meadowbrook Terrace, is a large collection of subdivisions to the northwest on Blanding Boulevard and Wells Road.
- Wellington Place
- Wells Lake - Wells Lake is a small lake area just South of Wells Road and West of the Orange Park city limits, it consists of low-rise luxury apartments.
- Wells Ridge / Woodside - Wells Ridge is a complex of townhomes and condominiums on the north side of Wells Road and Debarry Avenue. Further up the road going northeast is Woodside, a subdivision of single-family homes.

Residents of this area often will say they live in Orange Park, although they are outside the town limits.

== Notable person ==
Ronnie Van Zant (Lynyrd Skynyrd vocalist) was buried at Jacksonville Memorial Gardens in 1977.

== Demographics ==
Historical population
Census	Pop.	Note	%±
1980	12,144		—
1990	15,606		28.5%
2000	16,539		6.0%
2010	13,343		−19.3%
2020	14,482		8.5%

=== 2020 census ===
As of the 2020 census, Bellair-Meadowbrook Terrace had a population of 14,482. The median age was 35.8 years. 22.5% of residents were under the age of 18 and 16.3% of residents were 65 years of age or older. For every 100 females there were 91.7 males, and for every 100 females age 18 and over there were 87.6 males age 18 and over.

100.0% of residents lived in urban areas, while 0.0% lived in rural areas.

There were 5,738 households in Bellair-Meadowbrook Terrace, of which 31.2% had children under the age of 18 living in them. Of all households, 34.7% were married-couple households, 22.3% were households with a male householder and no spouse or partner present, and 34.0% were households with a female householder and no spouse or partner present. About 29.4% of all households were made up of individuals and 9.6% had someone living alone who was 65 years of age or older.

There were 6,168 housing units, of which 7.0% were vacant. The homeowner vacancy rate was 2.4% and the rental vacancy rate was 7.5%.

Racial composition as of the 2020 census
Race	Number	Percent
White	8,127	56.1%
Black or African American	3,092	21.4%
American Indian and Alaska Native	60	0.4%
Asian	455	3.1%
Native Hawaiian and Other Pacific Islander	33	0.2%
Some other race	901	6.2%
Two or more races	1,814	12.5%
Hispanic or Latino (of any race)	2,435	16.8%

=== 2010 census ===
As of the census of 2010, there were 13,343 people, a 19.3% decrease from 2000. There were 5,296 households, and 3,460 families residing in the CDP. The population density was 2,951.6 inhabitants per square mile (1,139.6/km^{2}). There were 6,805 housing units at an average density of 1,214.4 per square mile (468.9/km^{2}). The racial makeup of the CDP was 70.9% White, 17.9% African American, 0.5% Native American, 3.66% Asian, 0.2% Pacific Islander, 4.3% from other races, and 3.6% from two or more races. Hispanic or Latino of any race were 12.9% of the population.

=== 2000 census ===
As of the 2000 census, there were 6,447 households, out of which 33.2% had children under the age of 18 living with them, 50.3% were married couples living together, 14.4% had a female householder with no husband present, and 31.1% were non-families. 23.3% of all households were made up of individuals, and 5.0% had someone living alone who was 65 years of age or older. The average household size was 2.53 and the average family size was 2.98.

In the CDP, the population was spread out, with 25.1% under the age of 18, 11.4% from 18 to 24, 30.9% from 25 to 44, 23.6% from 45 to 64, and 9.1% who were 65 years of age or older. The median age was 33 years. For every 100 females, there were 93.9 males. For every 100 females age 18 and over, there were 91.2 males.

The median income for a household in the CDP was $42,426, and the median income for a family was $47,926. Males had a median income of $32,936 versus $23,117 for females. The per capita income for the CDP was $21,095. About 5.9% of families and 7.5% of the population were below the poverty line, including 11.8% of those under age 18 and 1.1% of those age 65 or over.

== Transportation ==
=== Major highways ===
- SR 21: Blanding Boulevard
- SR 224: Kingsley Avenue

Blanding Boulevard is the major arterial roadway through Bellair-Meadowbrook Terrace. It connects the area to the city of Jacksonville to the north and to Lakeside to the south. On the southern tip, Blanding Boulevard connects to Kingsley Avenue going East towards Orange Park.

=== Clay Community Transportation ===
Clay Community Transportation (CCT) is a county-wide shuttle service operated by the Jacksonville Transportation Authority (JTA). It runs 2 lines and 4 stops in the area.

==== Lines ====
- Clay Blue Line: Connects to NAS Jacksonville, Orange Park, Lakeside, Fleming Island and Green Cove Springs.
- Clay Red Line: Connects to Orange Park, Lakeside, and Middleburg.

==== Stops ====
- Orange Park Mall
- Orange Park Medical Center

== See also ==
- Bellair, Clay County, Florida
- Meadowbrook Terrace, Florida
- North Meadowbrook Terrace, Florida
