= Shands Bridge =

Bridge in Florida, United States of America

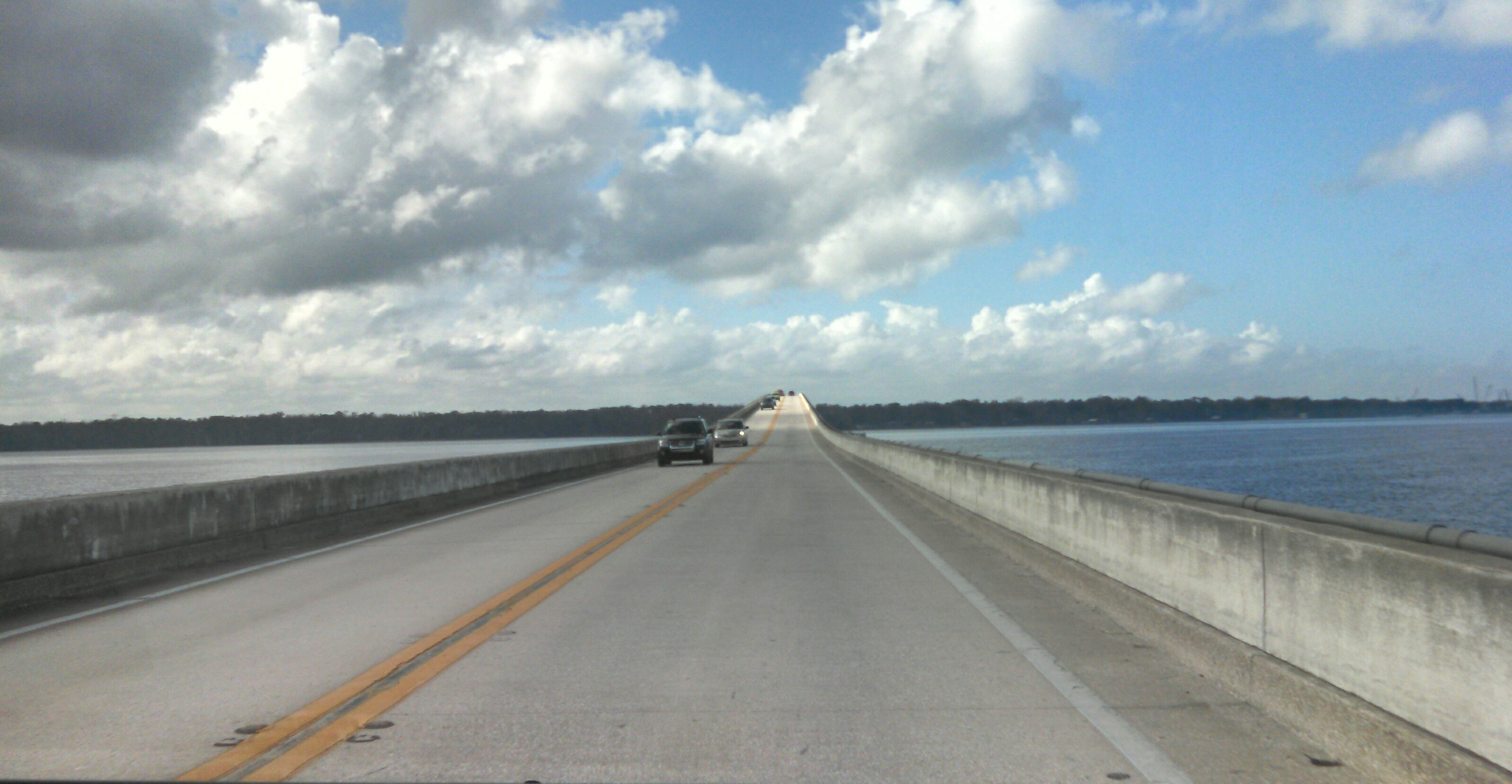
- Westbound on the Shands Bridge (2016)
- Coordinates: 29.9833°N 81.6167°W
- Carries: 2 general purpose lanes (SR 16)
- Crosses: St. Johns River
- Locale: Green Cove Springs, Florida
- Official name: Alvin G. Shands Bridge
- Maintained by: Florida Department of Transportation
- ID number: 780056

Characteristics
- Design: Steel; Stringer/Multi-beam or Girder bridge
- Total length: 2030.6 meters (6662 feet)
- Width: 10.4 meters (34 feet)
- Longest span: 39.6 meters (130 feet)
- Clearance above: 13.7 meters (45 feet)(vertical) x 27.7 meters (91 feet)(horizontal)

History
- Opened: October 30, 1963

Location
- Interactive map of Shands Bridge

The Shands Bridge is a two-lane automobile bridge carrying SR 16 over the St. Johns River south of Jacksonville, Florida.

Construction on a $595 million project to replace the bridge with a widened structure immediately south of the existing span began in 2024 and is scheduled for completion in 2030.

== History ==
The first structure at the site was a 2-mile-long wooden toll span with a draw bridge inaugurated in 1928. It was located just north of the current span, crossing from Orangedale to the present Shands pier on the west side of the river. The current bridge was dedicated on October 30, 1963, and features concrete beam-type construction for a total of two lanes. Until the building of the I-295 Buckman Bridge it was the only crossing of the St. Johns River between Jacksonville and Palatka.

In 2004, proposals were made to replace or upgrade the span. Problems cited include increasing traffic in the Clay County and St. Johns County areas, safety, and the inability of large boats to travel upriver. One plan proposed a new bridge north of the existing one, connecting to extensions of SR 9B and SR 23. Eventually a planned span just to the south was selected. In the fall of 2005, the railings of the bridge were upgraded to solid concrete barriers in an effort to reduce over-bridge fatalities.

On October 7, 2016, the eastern approach to the bridge was eroded by Hurricane Matthew, and the bridge was closed. However, the bridge reopened on October 9, 2016.

== Replacement ==
The third and final segment of the First Coast Expressway (also known as SR 23, which will connect I-10 and I-95 as a partial outer toll beltway around Jacksonville and Orange Park) includes a new four-lane bridge over the St. Johns River just south of where the Shands Bridge currently stands, as well as construction of new roadway connecting to I-95 in St. Johns County. Right-of-way acquisition, design and permitting for this $763 million segment is expected to be completed in 2020, with construction beginning in 2025 and ending in 2030. The existing bridge will be partially removed, with the remaining sections turned into fishing piers.

While the existing bridge has no street lighting or pedestrian path and features only one lane of traffic in each direction surrounded by narrow shoulders, the future bridge will contain two 12-foot general purpose and a 12-foot breakdown lane in each direction. It will also feature street lighting, and a 12-foot, 8.5-inch wide shared-use path with several scenic overlooks on the northen side of the new span. The vertical clearance height of the new bridge will be 65 feet from the water line, compared to the existing 45 feet of clearance. The additional 20 feet will match the clearance of the Buckman Bridge to the north and Palatka's Memorial Bridge to the south and is an improvement for marine commerce in the region.

Unlike the rest of the First Coast Expressway, driving on the new bridge will not incur paying a toll.

== Gallery ==
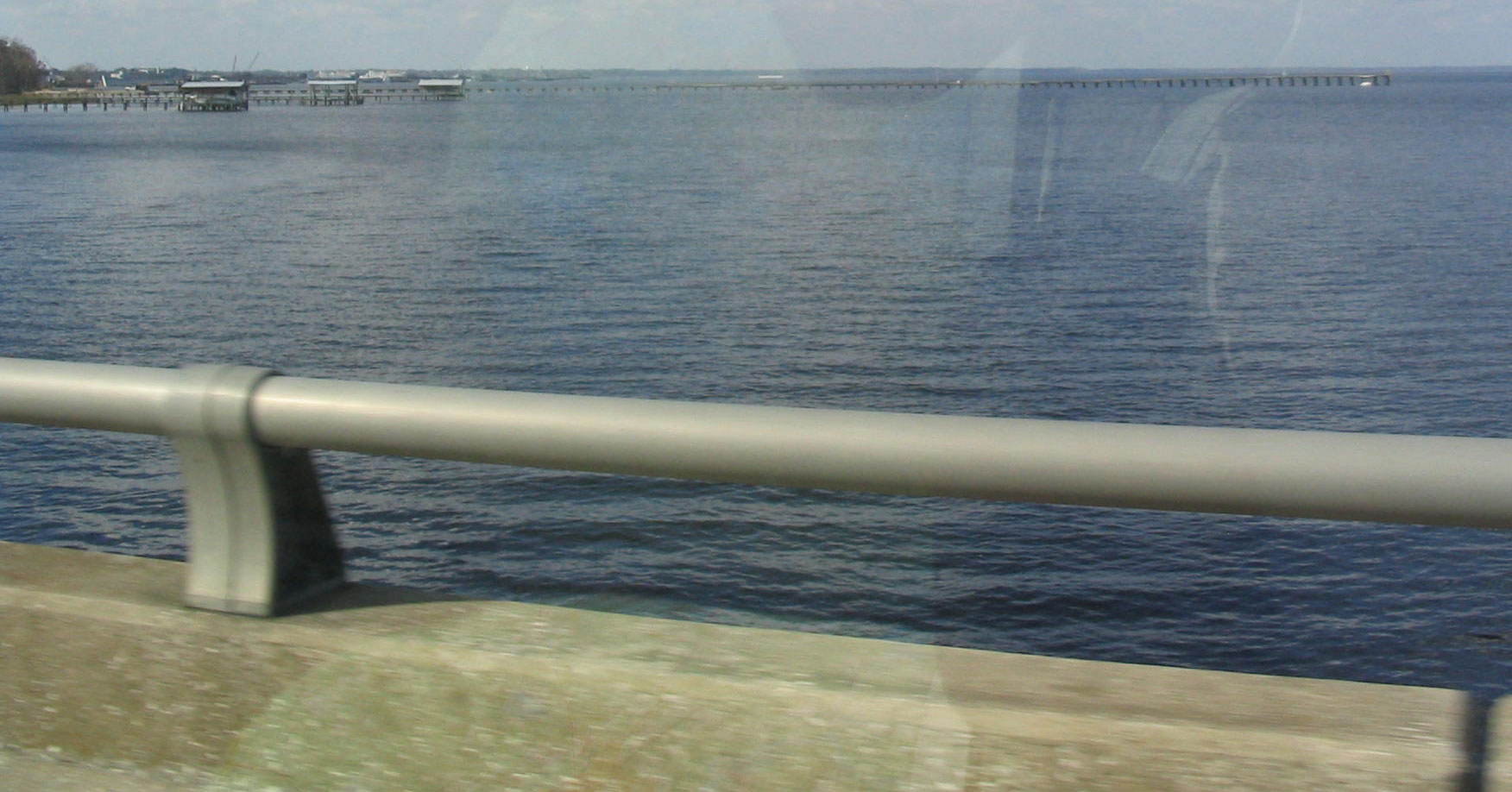
View of the remnants of the 1928 bridge from the current one

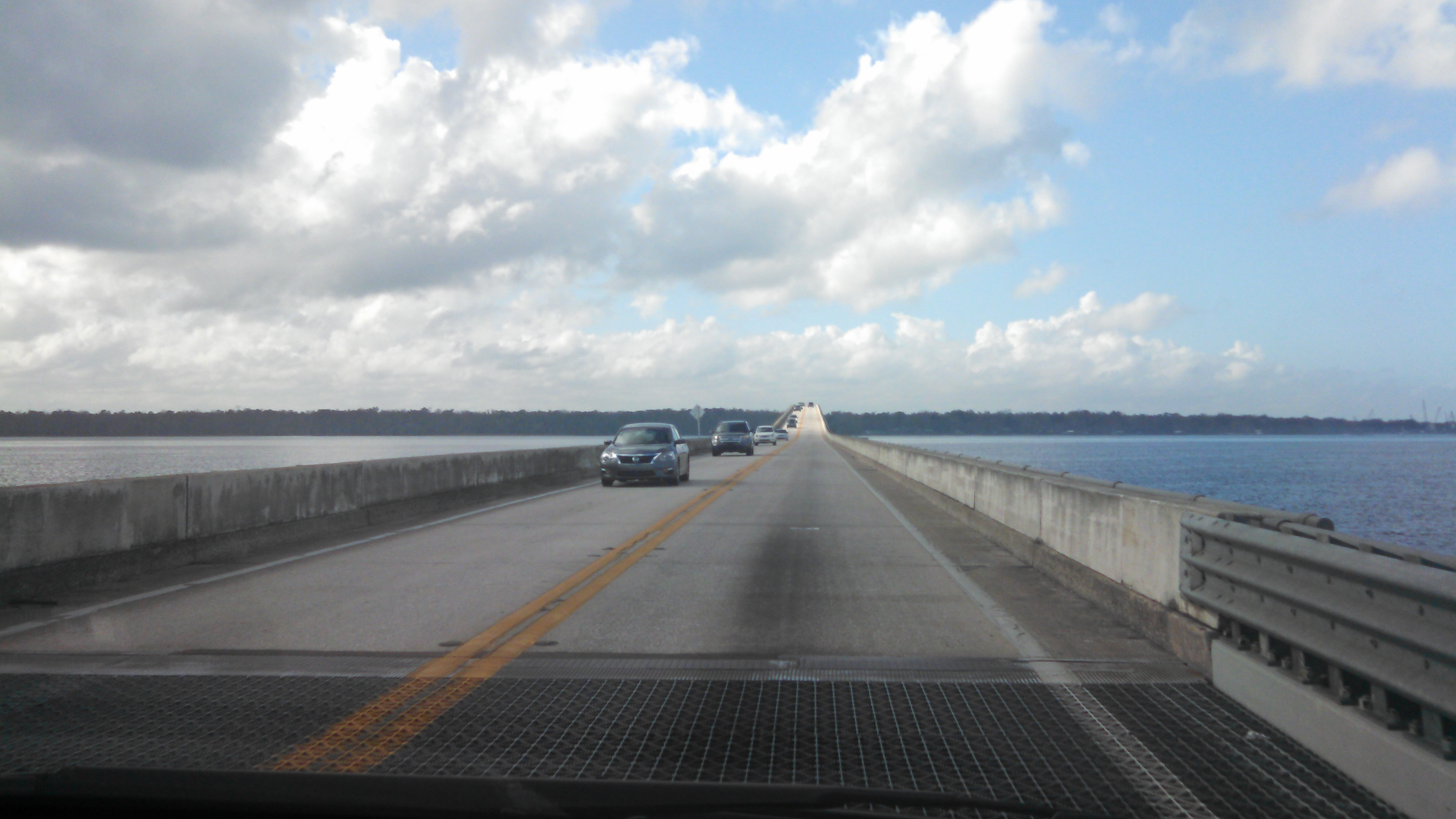
Westbound on Shands bridge with current barriers

== See also ==
- List of crossings of the St. Johns River
