= Florida State Road 15A =

Highway in Florida

State Road 15A

Route information
- Auxiliary route of SR 15
- Maintained by FDOT
- Length: 6.899 mi (11.103 km)

Major junctions
- South end: US 17 / US 92 in DeLand
- North end: US 17 / CR 15A north of DeLand

Location
- Country: United States
- State: Florida
- Counties: Volusia

Highway system
- Florida State Highway System; Interstate; US; State; Former; Pre‑1945; Toll; Scenic
| ← SR 15 | → SR 16 |

State Road 15A (SR 15A) is part of the Florida State Road System, and a suffixed alternate of State Road 15. Along with its parent route, SR 15A is signed north–south.

== Route description ==
SR 15A begins at the intersection of US 17/92 (SR 15/600; South Woodland Boulevard) as a western continuation of East Taylor Road, which from there runs east to CR 4101. It forms a western truck bypass for the aforementioned routes around DeLand, and begins to curve to the northwest just before the intersection with South Adelle Avenue while West Taylor Road resumes in a realigned road just south of the intersection with SR 15A and South Adelle, which returns to the original trajectory that SR 15A replaced. North of the intersection with West Beresford Avenue it becomes part of South Spring Garden Boulevard. Along the way, the otherwise minor intersection with Camphor Lane leads to the NRHP-listed John B. Stetson House. The sole intersection with a state route along this road, other than those at the termini is Florida State Road 44 (West New York Avenue), and South Spring Garden Boulevard becomes North Spring Garden Boulevard. Additionally, SR 15A becomes not only a truck bypass for US 17 and 92, but for SR 44 north of this point. Along the way, North Spring Garden Boulevard encounters a grade crossing with CSX DeLand Spur, and former industrial areas can be found in the vicinity of the crossing between Wisconsin and Minnesota Avenues, primarily along the east side.

North of Plymouth Avenue, the road changes from a four-lane undivided highway to a four-lane divided one. The truck bypasses for US 92 and SR 44 along SR 15A end at the intersection of Volusia County Road 92 (International Speedway Boulevard), across the street from Grantham Way, the latter of which is the entrance to the Glenwood Springs residential community. VCR 92 connects to motorists and truck drivers the northern end of the US 17/92 overlap. North of that intersection, SR 15A leaves the city limits and runs through semi-rural surroundings in unincorporated segments of Volusia County. The only signalized intersection in this vicinity is with Glenwood Road (Volusia County Road 4088), an unmarked west to east county road that leaves its community namesake immediately west of the intersection with SR 15A, and has an eastern terminus at the fork in the road with US 17 and SR 11. The last intersection before the route's northern terminus is two streets obstructed by the divider; Tall Oaks Road leading from the southbound lanes and Williamsbridge Road leading from the northbound lanes. After this SR 15A curves to the northeast and terminates at US 17/FL 15 (North Woodland Boulevard), north of DeLand. It continues northeast from its northern end as CR 15A to SR 11.

== Major intersections ==
The entire route is in Volusia County.

| Location | mi | km | Destinations | Notes |
|---|---|---|---|---|
| DeLand | 0.000 | 0.000 | US 17 / US 92 (South Woodland Boulevard / SR 15 / SR 600) to I-4 | |
| DeLand | 2.748 | 4.422 | SR 44 (New York Avenue) – Eustis, DeLand, Hontoon Island State Park, Amtrak | |
| DeLand | 4.571 | 7.356 | CR 92 east (International Speedway Boulevard) to US 92 – truck bypass to US 92 east | |
| | 5.767 | 9.281 | Glenwood Road (CR 4088) - Glenwood | |
| | 6.899 | 11.103 | US 17 (SR 15) / CR 15A north to SR 11 – Palatka, DeLand | |
1.000 mi = 1.609 km; 1.000 km = 0.621 mi

== History ==
SR 15A used to include CR 15A, which continues the bypass to SR 11. It also used to include SR 472.

=== Former sections ===
Several former sections of SR 15A have existed throughout the state within the vicinity of SR 15. These include SR 139 (Kings Highway) heading northwest out of downtown Jacksonville as a hidden route for U.S. Route 23, SR 551 (Goldenrod Road) east of Orlando, and SR 729 (State Market Road) in Pahokee.

One notable section was from US 17 Roosevelt Boulevard on US 17 Alt Roosevelt Expressway until ending on eastbound Interstate 10 (SR 8). With the realignment of US 17 onto the Roosevelt Expressway, that segment became part of SR 15.

Other sections of SR 15A have existed:

- SR 15A, now CR 15A, connected SR 15/SR 700 (US 98/US 441) at Upthegrove Beach to SR 710. At the same time, SR 15B (now CR 15B) connected the same two highways near the Okeechobee-Martin County boundary line about three miles (4.8 km) to the southeast.
- SR 15A, now CR 15A, connected SR 15 (US 17) south of Green Cove Springs to SR 16 west of Green Cove Springs.
- Several short sections of SR 15A spurred from SR 15 (US 17) in and near Orange Park. Some or all may now be CR 15A.
- SR 15A, now CR 15A, connected SR 15 (US 1-23) southeast of downtown Callahan to SR 200 (U.S. Route 301) southwest of downtown Callahan.

== Historic State Road 15C ==
In addition to the former SR 15B noted above, Okeechobee County also had a State Road 15C. Now CR 15C, it was, and still is, an eastward spur from SR 15 near Fort Drum.
