= Lake Geneva, Florida =

- Unincorporated community
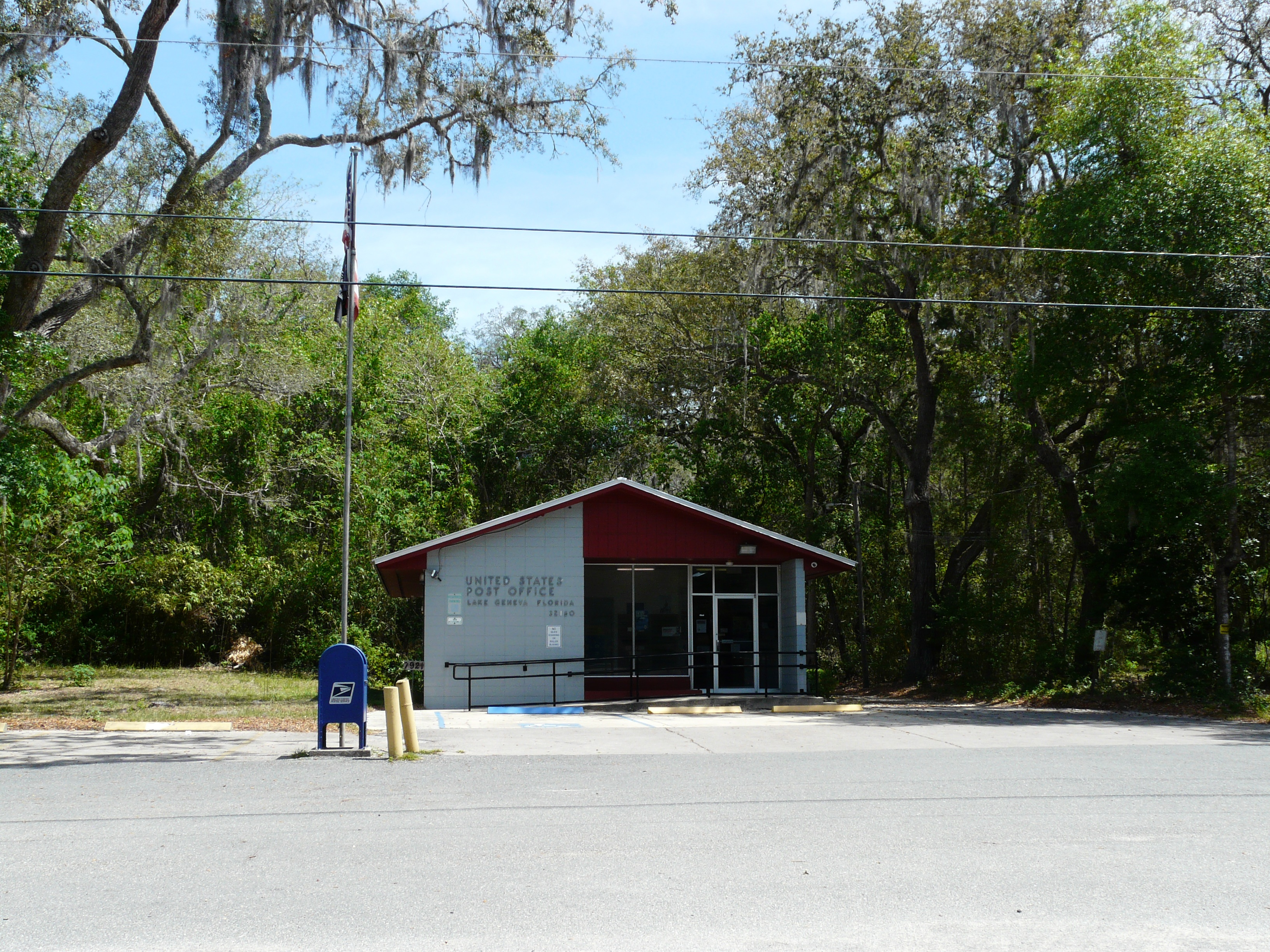
- Lake Geneva post office

- Location within Florida
- Coordinates: 29°46′20″N 82°00′36″W
- Country: United States
- State: Florida
- County: Clay
- Elevation: 135 ft (41 m)
- Time zone: UTC-5 (Eastern (EST))
  - Summer (DST): UTC-4 (EDT)
- Zip code: 32160
- Area code: 904
- GNIS feature ID: 285243

Lake Geneva is an unincorporated community located in Clay County, Florida, United States. The community is located along Florida State Road 100 southeast of Keystone Heights, Florida. It is named after Lake Geneva, which is the lake the settlement is right next to (not to be confused with the glacial lake of Lake Geneva on the northern front of the French Alps).
