= Melrose Historic District =

Historic district in Florida, United States

- U.S. National Register of Historic Places
- U.S. Historic district
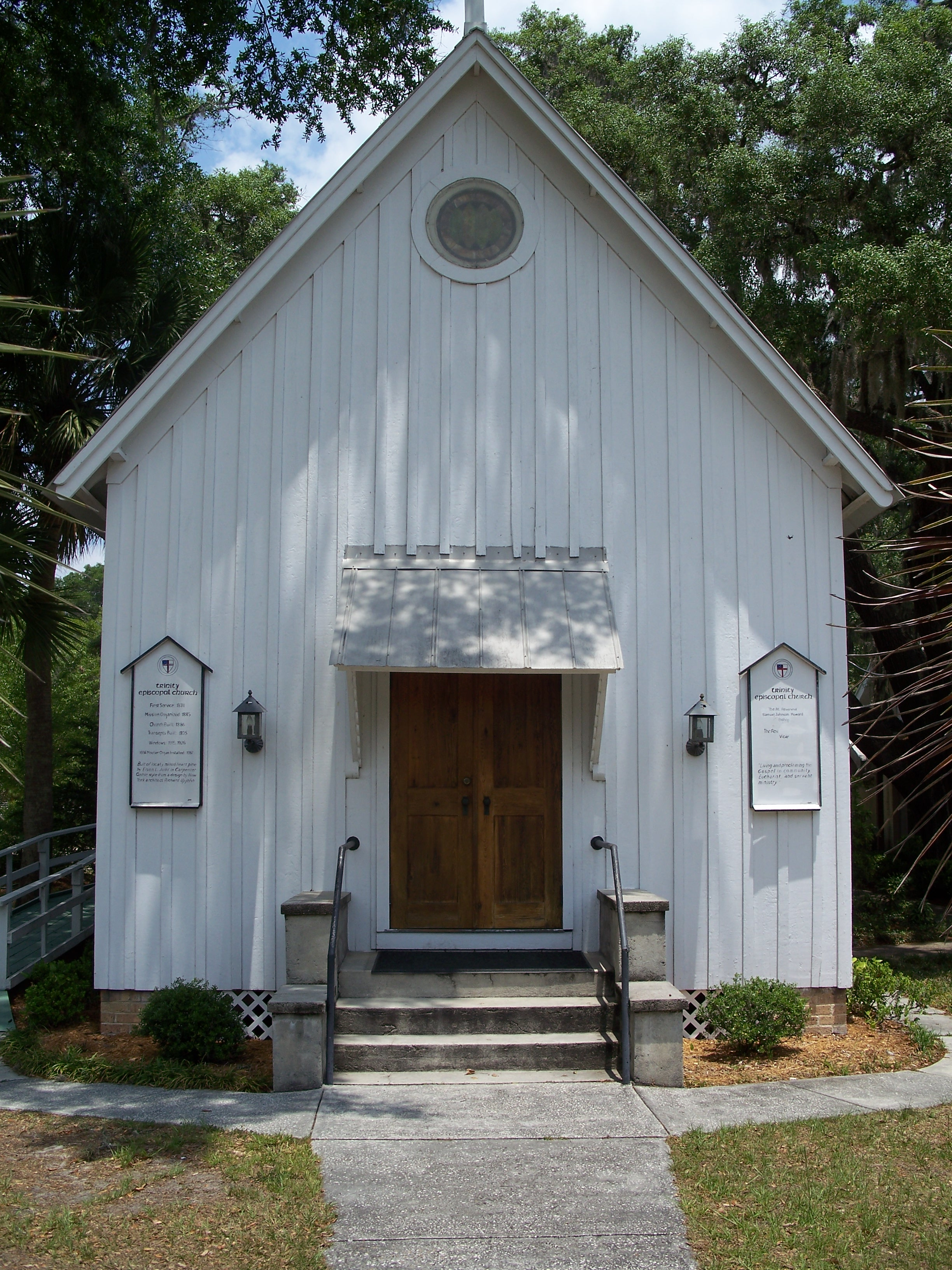
- Trinity Episcopal Church, in the district

- Location within Florida Location within the United States
- Location: Melrose, Florida
- Coordinates: 29°42′45″N 82°3′3″W
- Area: 250 acres (100 ha)
- NRHP reference No.: 89002305
- Added to NRHP: January 12, 1990

The Melrose Historic District is a 250-acre (100 ha) U.S. historic district in Melrose, Florida that was listed on the National Register of Historic Places in 1990. It is bounded by Seminole Ridge Road, Grove Street, South Street, Quail Street, and Melrose Bay. In 1990 it contained 65 contributing buildings, one contributing site, and 21 non-contributing buildings.

It is located in Alachua and Putnam counties.

== See also ==
- Trinity Episcopal Church (Melrose, Florida)
