= Manavista, Florida =

- Unincorporated community
- Location within Florida Location within the United States
- Coordinates: 27°30′56″N 82°32′07″W
- Country: United States
- State: Florida
- County: Manatee
- Elevation: 3 ft (0.91 m)
- Time zone: UTC-5 (EST)
  - Summer (DST): UTC-4 (EDT)
- Area code: 941
- GNIS feature ID: 301137

Manavista was an area surrounded by the Atwood Grape Fruit Company. The brief history of Manavista began when Kimball C. Atwood (1853–1934) purchased 265 acres of land that was situated a mile east of the city of Palmetto on the north side of the Manatee River in 1892. The grove consisted of about 96 rows of grapefruit trees. Atwood had an estate across the river in the town of Manatee. The winters of 1894 and 1895 were particularly severe and devastated the citrus industry in the state, driving the citrus belt further southward. It wasn't until 1897 that Atwood was able to procure new trees from the Reasoners, who owned and operated a plant nursery, had recently received them in stock. Grapefruit varieties included Duncan, Royal, and Walter. A post office was opened on May 12, 1898, with the name "Manavista" attached. The first postmaster under its supervision was Lewis C. Randall.

Meanwhile, the grove had bounced back from the two consecutive freezes and by 1915 it was producing 80,000 boxes of grapefruit, 1,200 of which were handled daily. It experienced its peak year in 1927 when 160,000 boxes of grapefruit were processed. The Atwood grove's fame spread to outside the United States. The American ambassador to the United Kingdom regularly purchased crates and the grove's fruit was served to officials in the royal household. The grove also shipped a complimentary crate of fruit to King George V of the United Kingdom (1865–1936) annually until the King's death. In 1934, Kimball Atwood died, and the grove closed soon afterward. The property remained in the possession of the Atwood family until 1968, when it was sold to Simens-Allis, who built a new plant. Eventually, the plant closed and in 2012, Feld Entertainment purchased the property and set up their new headquarters there.
