= Florida State Road 224 =

State highway in Florida, United States

State Road 224
- Kingsley Avenue
- SR 224 highlighted in red

Route information
- Maintained by FDOT
- Length: 2.781 mi (4.476 km)

Major junctions
- West end: SR 21 in Orange Park
- East end: US 17 in Orange Park

Location
- Country: United States
- State: Florida
- Counties: Clay

Highway system
- Florida State Highway System; Interstate; US; State; Former; Pre‑1945; Toll; Scenic
← SR 222	→ SR 226

State Road 224 (SR 224) is a four-lane road in Orange Park, Florida. It connects the unincorporated area on its western end at State Road 21, near the Orange Park Country Club to U.S. Route 17 (US 17). SR 224 is also known as Kingsley Avenue, named for the early Florida settler and plantation owner Zephaniah Kingsley.

Sites of interest along SR 224 include: Orange Park High School, Orange Park Medical Center, a United States Post Office, the Orange Park Town Hall (on the corner of US 17 and SR 224) and Moosehaven.

== Major intersections ==
The entire route is in Orange Park, Clay County.

mi	km	Destinations	Notes
0.000	0.000	SR 21 (Blanding Boulevard) to Loch Rane Boulevard west / Kingsley Avenue begins / I-295	Western terminus of SR 224 and Kingsley Avenue; eastern terminus of Loch Rane Boulevard
2.234	3.595	Doctors Lake Drive west (CR 224A west)	Eastern terminus of Doctors Lake Drive and the unsigned CR 224A
2.781	4.476	US 17 (Park Avenue / SR 15) to Kingsley Avenue east / I-295	Eastern terminus; roadway continues as Kingsley Avenue.
1.000 mi = 1.609 km; 1.000 km = 0.621 mi
