= Memphis Heights, Florida =

Unincorporated community in Florida, U.S.

Coordinates: 27°32′12″N 82°33′15″W

Memphis Heights is an unincorporated area in Manatee County, Florida, United States.
