= Orange Park Mall =

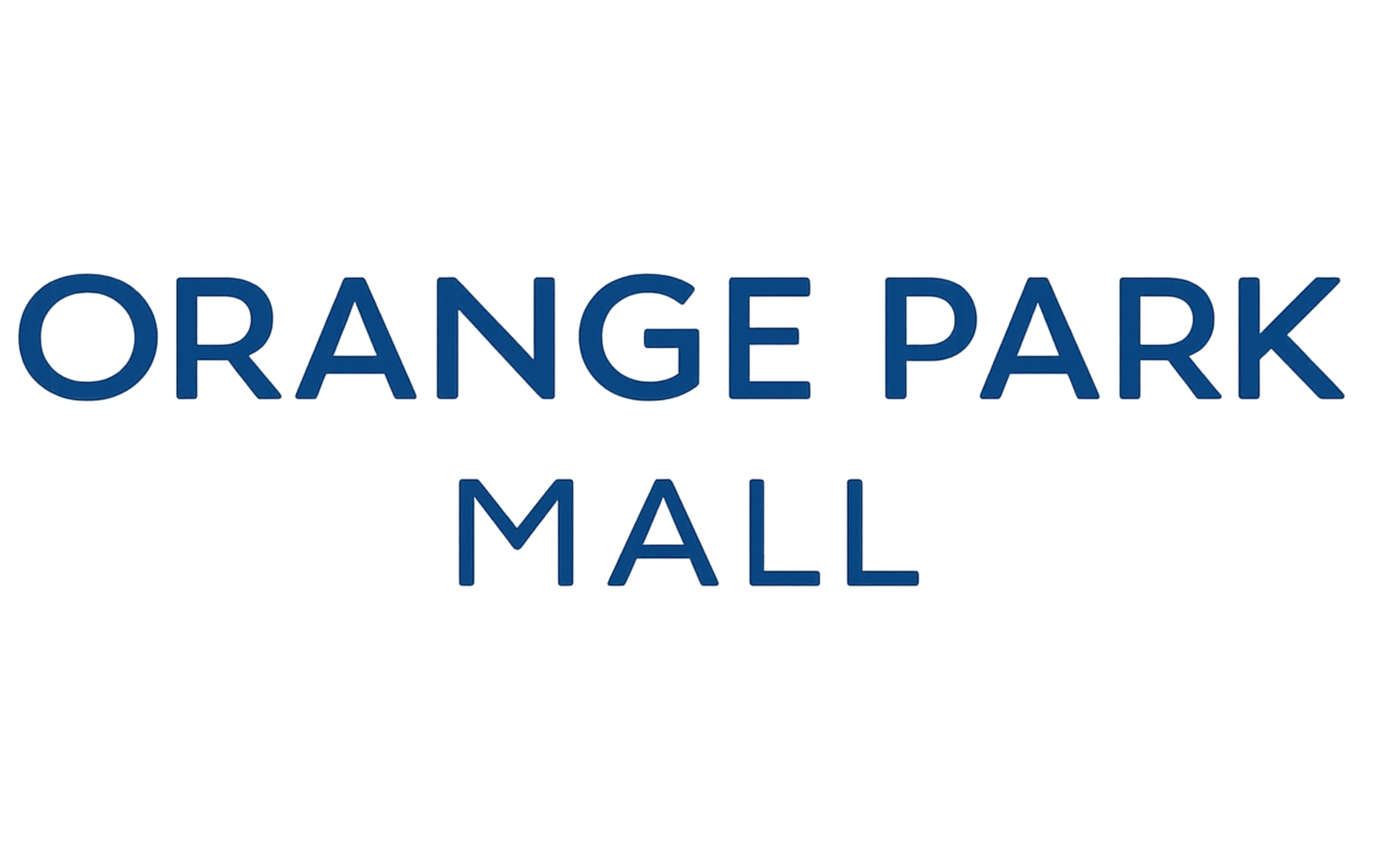

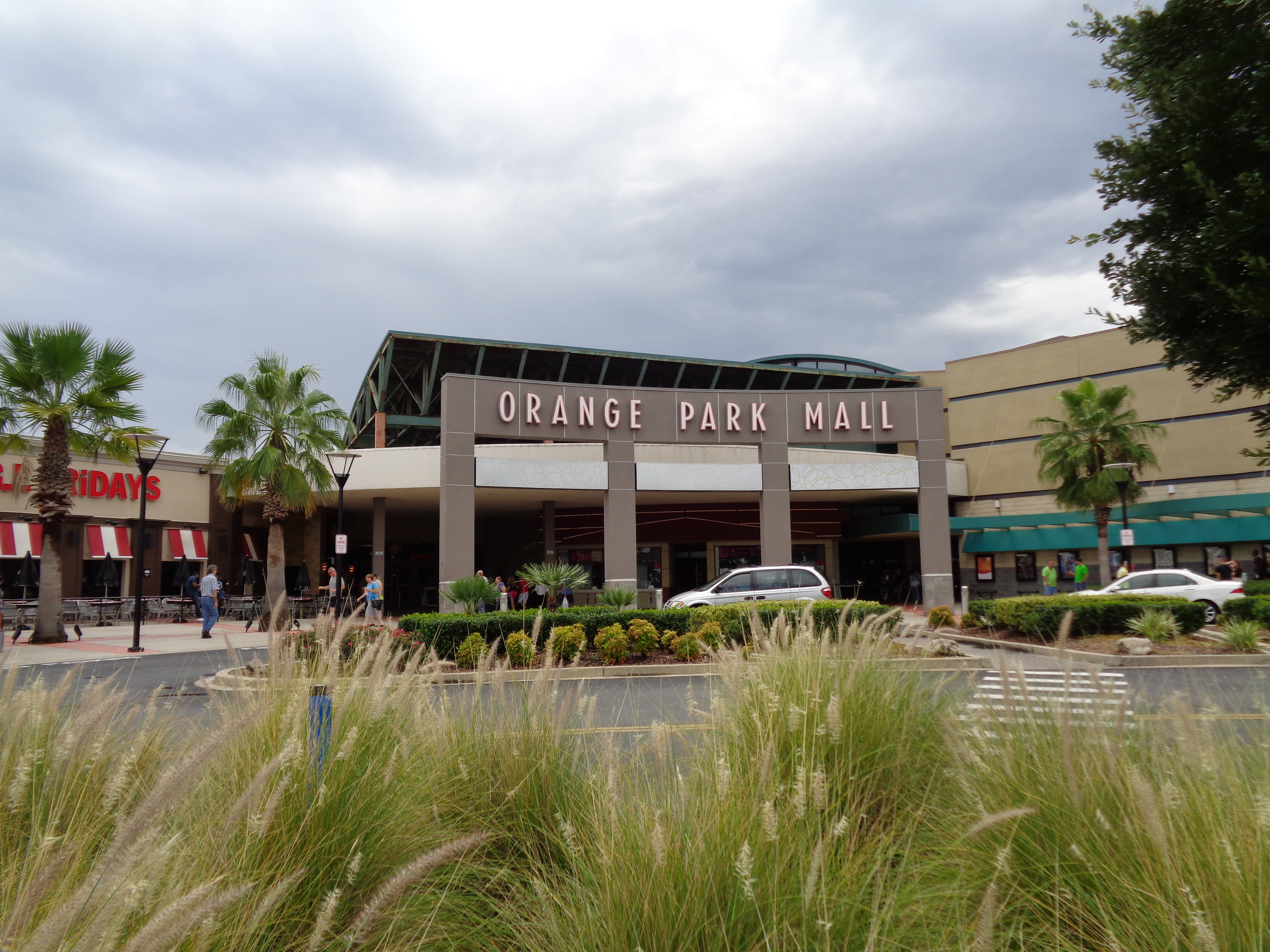
- Location: Orange Park, Florida, U.S.
- Coordinates: 30°11′4″N 81°44′5″W
- Opened: October 2, 1975; 51 years ago
- Developer: Retail Planning Corp.
- Manager: CBRE Group
- Num. of stores: 112
- Num. of anchor tenants: 6 (5 open, 1 coming soon)
- Floor area: 953,000 sq ft (88,500 m^{2})
- Floors: 1 (2 in traditional anchors)
- Website: orangeparkmall.com

Orange Park Mall is a shopping mall located in Bellair-Meadowbrook Terrace, an unincorporated suburban area just west of Orange Park, Florida, United States. It features Dillard's, JCPenney, Belk, Dick's Sporting Goods, and AMC Theatres as anchor stores.

== Mall history ==
First opened in 1975, the Orange Park Mall is the largest mall on the west side of the St. Johns River in the Jacksonville area. The mall contains over 110 stores and services. When it opened, it featured three anchors: Ivey's, May Cohen's, and Sears, like Volusia Mall a year before. In 1984, the mall added 300,000 square feet (28,000 m^{2}) that included a new food court and a JCPenney anchor. May Cohen's became May Florida shortly before being acquired by Maison Blanche in June 1988. Ivey's changed to Dillard's in June 1990. Maison Blanche was in turn taken over by Gayfers in early 1992 due to Mercantile Stores buying the chain. In 1997, the mall built a 24-screen AMC Theatres. Gayfers finally ended up as Belk in late 1998 because Mercantile was bought out by Dillard's which already had a store at the mall. Later, in 2006, the mall added a 48,003-square-foot (4,459.6 m^{2}) Dick's Sporting Goods anchor. The mall was sold to Washington Prime Group in 2014 and today stands at 953,000 square feet (88,500 m^{2}). On February 8, 2020, it was announced that Sears would be closing as part of a plan to close 39 stores nationwide. The store closed in April 2020.

In 2025, redevelopment on the former Sears began. The intention of redevelopment is to turn the former Sears space into several new tenants as part of a mixed-use project. The new project is to be called Orange Park place and will include space for five new tenants. These five new tenants will be a grocer, a dental office, a Mediterranean restaurant Cava, and other retail shops. The development began under Transformco which was the holding company of this former Sears and other Sears and Kmart stores until they sold the site to a developer known as Corta Orange Park who plans to move forward with the mixed-use project.
