= Midway, Santa Rosa County, Florida =

Midway, Florida
- Unincorporated community Census designated place
- Location of Midway, Santa Rosa County, Florida
- Coordinates: 30°24′18″N 87°06′27″W
- Country: United States
- State: Florida
- County: Santa Rosa County, Florida
- Elevation: 13 ft (4.0 m)

Population (2020)
  - Total: 19,567
- Time zone: UTC-6 (Central (CST))
  - Summer (DST): UTC-5 (CDT)
- Area code: 850
- GNIS feature ID: 2583363

Midway is an unincorporated community and census designated place (CDP) in southern Santa Rosa County, Florida. It is part of the Pensacola–Ferry Pass–Brent, Florida Metropolitan Statistical Area. The area is located between the communities of Gulf Breeze and Navarre, on the Fairpoint Peninsula. Midway is often considered to be part of one, if not both, of these communities. Its actual boundaries vary from source to source, but unofficially include most areas from the intersection of Soundside Drive with U.S. Highway 98, eastward until Highway 98 becomes Navarre Parkway.

Midway Water Systems, Inc., which provides water service to the communities of Gulf Breeze and Navarre, is located in Midway. The community also has a fire department, the Midway Fire Department. Midway is also home to VFW "Bruce J Bell Memorial" Post 4407 which is often referred to as the 'Friendliest Little Post in Florida".

Per the 2020 Census, the population was 19,567, up from 16,115 at the 2010 census.

== History ==
The area developed primarily in the mid-20th century as a residential community connected to employment centers in nearby Pensacola and surrounding military installations.

Historically rural, the Midway area consisted of woods and scattered development prior to post–World War II growth. Population increased as transportation access improved and residential development expanded eastward from Gulf Breeze. In the late 20th century, Midway continued to grow as part of the Pensacola metropolitan area, remaining unincorporated while functioning largely as a bedroom community with commercial activity concentrated along U.S. 98.

Since 2000, Midway has experienced continued residential growth and expanded commercial development as part of broader growth in southern Santa Rosa County. This period has included the construction of new housing subdivisions and supporting retail and county services.

== Geography ==
=== Climate ===
Midway is located in the humid subtropical climate zone.

Climate data for Pensacola, Florida normals (Nearest weather station to Midway)
Month	Jan	Feb	Mar	Apr	May	Jun	Jul	Aug	Sep	Oct	Nov	Dec	Year
Record high °F (°C)	81 (27)	82 (28)	88 (31)	96 (36)	102 (39)	102 (39)	106 (41)	104 (40)	102 (39)	95 (35)	87 (31)	81 (27)	106 (41)
Mean daily maximum °F (°C)	60.5 (15.8)	63.8 (17.7)	69.6 (20.9)	75.7 (24.3)	83.2 (28.4)	88.5 (31.4)	90.0 (32.2)	89.4 (31.9)	86.5 (30.3)	78.9 (26.1)	70.3 (21.3)	62.6 (17.0)	76.6 (24.8)
Mean daily minimum °F (°C)	42.2 (5.7)	45.5 (7.5)	51.2 (10.7)	57.6 (14.2)	66.0 (18.9)	72.5 (22.5)	74.5 (23.6)	74.2 (23.4)	70.3 (21.3)	60.3 (15.7)	51.2 (10.7)	44.4 (6.9)	59.2 (15.1)
Record low °F (°C)	5 (−15)	7 (−14)	22 (−6)	33 (1)	44 (7)	55 (13)	61 (16)	60 (16)	43 (6)	32 (0)	22 (−6)	11 (−12)	5 (−15)
Average precipitation inches (mm)	4.64 (118)	5.06 (129)	5.81 (148)	4.32 (110)	4.17 (106)	6.60 (168)	7.40 (188)	6.77 (172)	5.98 (152)	5.24 (133)	4.73 (120)	4.55 (116)	65.27 (1,658)
Average precipitation days (≥ 0.01 in)	8.9	8.6	8.1	6.5	6.7	11.1	14.0	13.6	8.8	6.1	7.2	9.0	108.6
Source: NOAA

=== Topography ===
Midway lies within the Gulf Coastal Plain of the western Florida Panhandle. The terrain is generally flat with sandy soils supporting oak and pine vegetation. The area is situated between the Santa Rosa Sound and Pensacola Bay.

== Demographics ==
Historical population
Census	Pop.	Note	%±
2010	16,115		—
2020	19,567		21.4%
U.S. Decennial Census; 2010 2020

Midway in Santa Rosa County first appeared as a census designated place in the 2010 U.S. census.

=== 2020 census ===
Midway CDP, Santa Rosa County, Florida – Racial and ethnic composition (NH = Non-Hispanic) Note: the US Census treats Hispanic/Latino as an ethnic category. This table excludes Latinos from the racial categories and assigns them to a separate category. Hispanics/Latinos may be of any race.
Race / Ethnicity	Pop 2010	Pop 2020	% 2010	% 2020
White alone (NH)	14,329	16,152	88.92%	82.55%
Black or African American alone (NH)	293	421	1.82%	2.15%
Native American or Alaska Native alone (NH)	105	82	0.65%	0.42%
Asian alone (NH)	297	447	1.84%	2.28%
Pacific Islander alone (NH)	13	19	0.08%	0.10%
Some Other Race alone (NH)	24	81	0.15%	0.41%
Mixed Race/Multi-Racial (NH)	314	1,103	1.95%	5.64%
Hispanic or Latino (any race)	740	1,262	4.59%	6.45%
Total	16,115	19,567	100.00%	100.00%

== Education ==
Education in Midway, Florida is served by the Santa Rosa County School District. The school district operates public elementary, middle, and high schools serving the area.

- Eastbay K-8
- Soundside High School
- West Navarre Primary School
- West Navarre Intermediate School
- Woodlawn Beach Middle School

The community is also home to the Pensacola State College South Santa Rosa Campus, which offers postsecondary and workforce education serving southern Santa Rosa County.
