= Meadowbrook Terrace, Florida =

Meadowbrook Terrace
- Unincorporated community
- Location within the state of Florida
- Coordinates: 30°10′38″N 81°44′30″W
- Country: United States
- State: Florida
- County: Clay
- Time zone: UTC-5 (Eastern (EST))
  - Summer (DST): UTC-4 (EDT)
- ZIP codes: 32073

Meadowbrook Terrace is an unincorporated community in northern Clay County, Florida, United States, just south of the border of Jacksonville. The community is combined with Bellair and North Meadowbrook Terrace, to form the census-designated place of Bellair-Meadowbrook Terrace by the U.S. Census Bureau.

== Communications ==
The ZIP code that serves the community is 32073, and the local area code is 904.
