= Melrose, Florida =

Melrose
- Unincorporated community
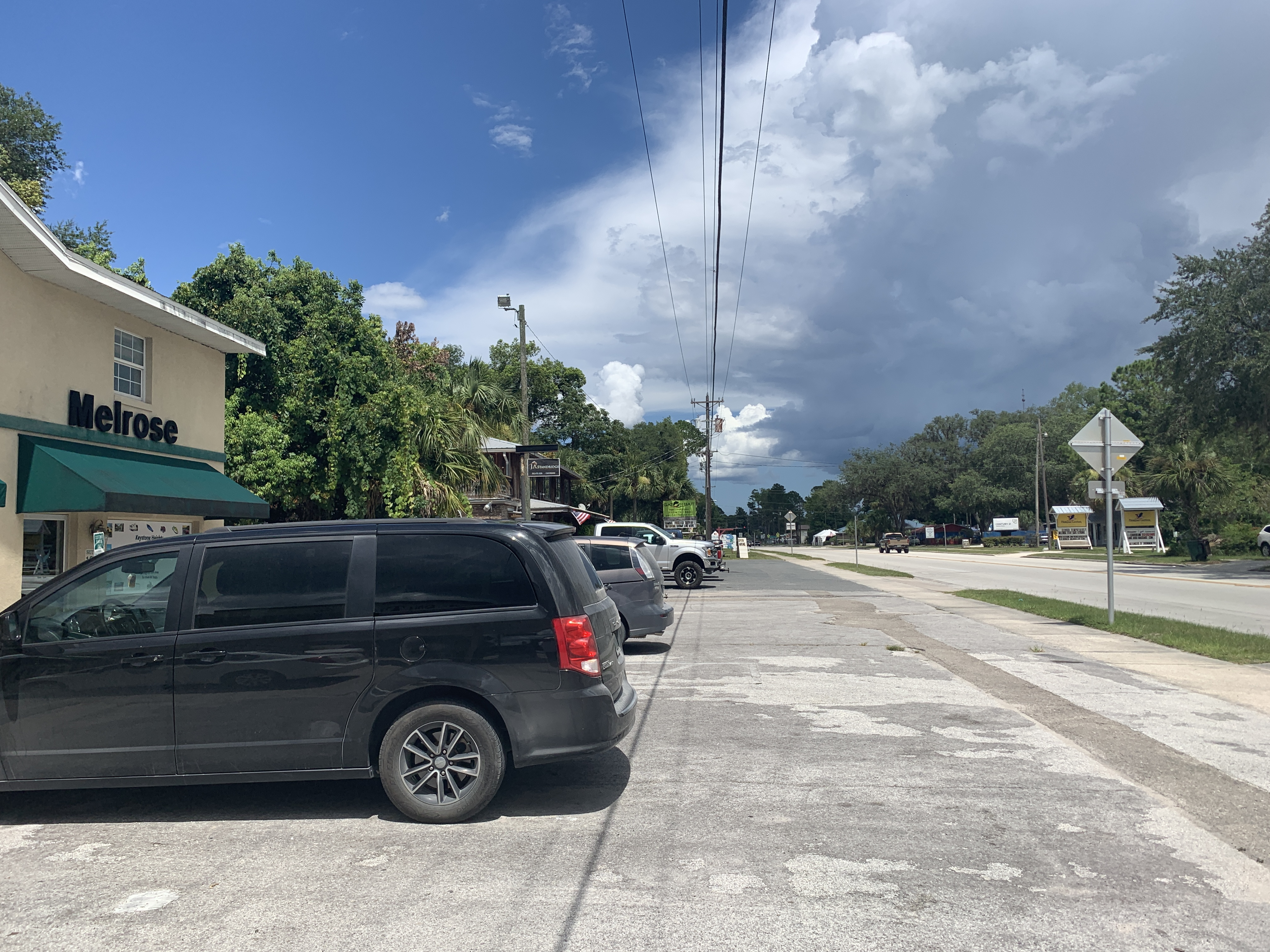
- A former gas station now serving as commercial building on Florida SR 26 and Grove Street.

- Location within the state of Florida
- Coordinates: 29°43′N 82°3′W
- Country: United States
- State: Florida
- County: Alachua, Putnam, Clay, Bradford
- Time zone: UTC-5 (Eastern (EST))
  - Summer (DST): UTC-4 (EDT)
- ZIP code: 32666

Melrose is an unincorporated community in Alachua and Putnam, Clay, Bradford counties in the U.S. state of Florida. It lies on State Road 26, approximately 17 mi (27 km) east of Gainesville (straight-line distance) and approximately 50 mi (80 km) southwest of Jacksonville (straight-line distance). The town lies on Lake Santa Fe.

== History ==
Melrose was settled in the second half of the 19th century at the crossing of the Bellamy Road (now State Road 26) and the Starke-Orange Springs Road (now State Road 21), near the Eliam Church and Shakerag race course, and about one mile from the older settlement of Banana. The new town was named Melrose after Melrose Abbey in Melrose, Scotland. It was reported that the ladies of the town did not want it to be known as Shakerag. The town of Melrose included part of the Shakerag race course, but there was no settlement at the Shakerag race course before Melrose was settled, and Tolles states that "[t]o say Melrose used to be called Shake Rag is poetic license."

In the late 1800s, the citrus industry thrived in the area. Local growers would bring their yearly harvest to Melrose, where it was loaded onto steam ships in Lake Santa Fe. The ships would then steam from lake Santa Fe to Lake Alto, and then Lake Alto to the town of Waldo using man made canals. The citrus was then transported by rail across the United States. The rail was known as the Lake Santa Fe Route to most people who lived in the area at the time. During this period, families moved into houses around Lake Santa Fe and the citrus groves. In 1894, however, two devastating freezes hit the Melrose area and destroyed local groves. Growers then relocated to warmer areas in the central and southern parts of Florida.

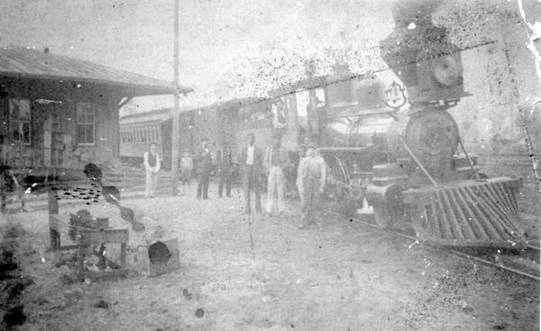
The Green Cove Springs and Melrose Railroad with a train in 1890. Many of these carried citrus and logs.

For the rest of the 20th century, citrus farming was rebuilt, but not as large and powerful as it was in the 19th century. Also during this time period, grapevine farms were founded around and outside the community. On January 12, 1990, the Melrose Historic District was designated a U.S. historic district. It encompasses 1,250 acres (5.1 km^{2}), and contains dozens of historic buildings, the most well-known being the Trinity Episcopal Church. Furthermore, during the 20th century, many small businesses and restaurants were built which thrived, making the city a stopping place for travelers going into other states like Georgia and Alabama, as well as those commuting to and from larger cities such as Gainesville and Jacksonville. Fishing in Lake Santa Fe became more popular with locals, as catfish, bass, and other animals could be caught.

== Library ==
The Melrose Public Library was the first full-service branch in Putnam County. Members of the Melrose Women’s Club, including former Melrose Elementary School principal Maud Watkins, were the initial fundraisers. The Melrose Public Library opened December 22, 1984 with Virginia Bird serving as the first librarian. Bird was later succeeded by Stella Brown and Sheree Sims.
