= Mike Roess Gold Head Branch State Park =

State park in Florida, United States

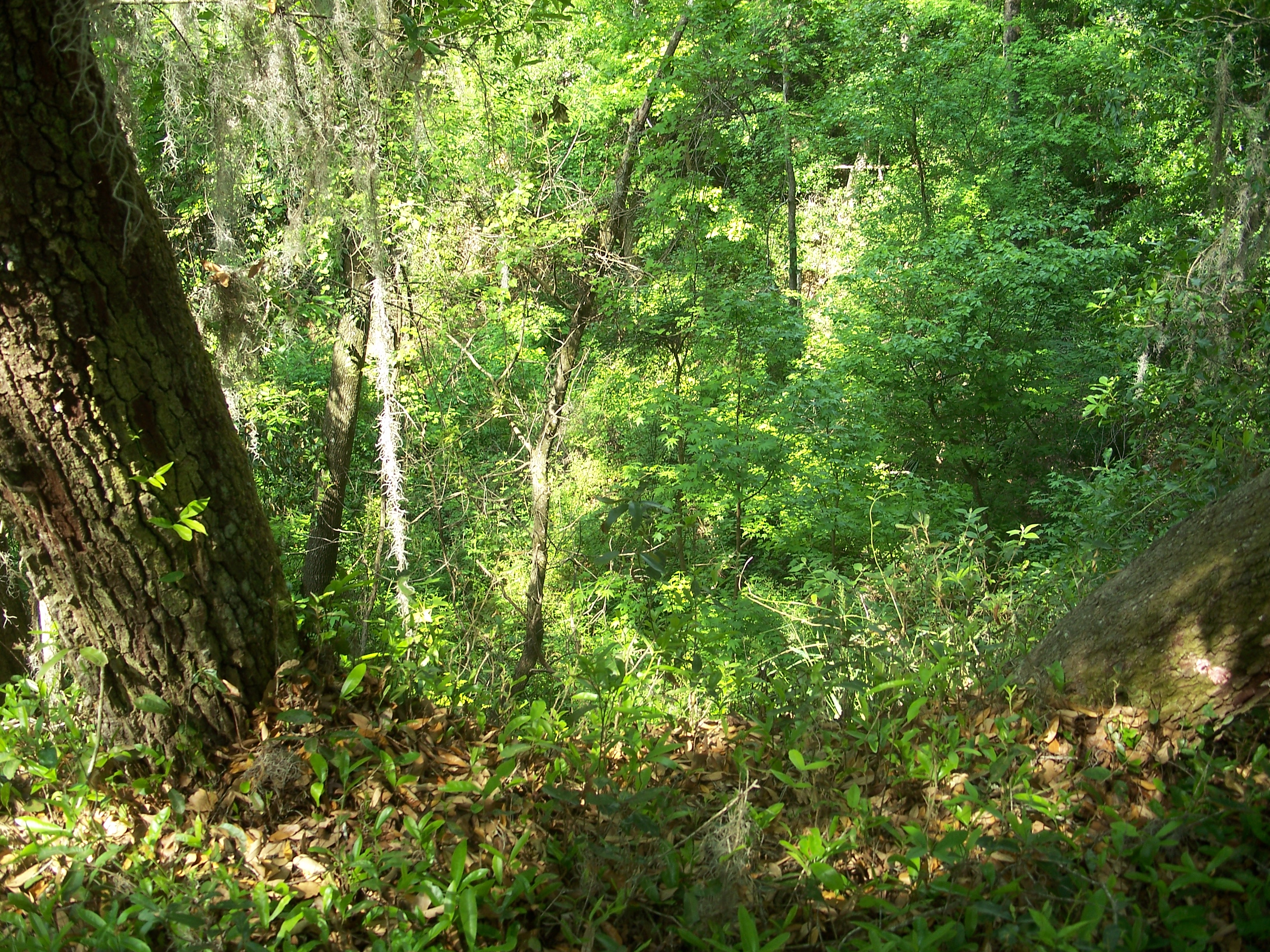

- Location within Florida Location within the United States
- Interactive map of Mike Roess Gold Head Branch State Park
- Location: Clay County, Florida, USA
- Nearest city: Keystone Heights, Florida
- Coordinates: 29°49′55″N 81°57′11″W
- Area: 2,000 acres (8.1 km^{2})
- Established: 1935
- Governing body: Florida Department of Environmental Protection

Gold Head Branch State Park, a Florida State Park, is just shy of 2400 acres (8 km²) of rolling sandhills, marshes, ravines, lakes and scrub located midway between Gainesville and Jacksonville, six miles (10 km) north of Keystone Heights on SR 21. Gold Head is one of the earliest state parks in Florida. Some of its amenities, including cabins, were originally constructed by the Civilian Conservation Corps (CCC) in the 1930s. The park was listed on the National Register of Historic Places in 2020.

== Biology ==
Among the wildlife of the park are fox squirrels, southeastern kestrels, red-tailed hawks, bald eagles, wild turkeys, and gopher tortoises. The park also has pocket gopher, fox, white-tailed deer and variety of water and wading birds. The park has a diversity of wild flowers. Among them are blazing star, goldenrod, and lopsided Indian grass.

== Recreational activities ==
Activities include fishing, horseback riding, canoeing, swimming, hiking and wildlife viewing. Amenities include full facility camping, lakeside cabins, a picnic area overlooking Little Lake Johnson, and a beach on the lake. The park also has four marked hiking trails and a seven-mile (11 km) equestrian trail.

== Hours ==
Florida state parks are open between 8 a.m. and sundown every day of the year (including holidays).
