= Midway, Seminole County, Florida =

Midway, Florida
- Unincorporated community Census designated place
- Location in Seminole County and the state of Florida
- Coordinates: 28°47′33″N 81°13′53″W
- Country: United States
- State: Florida
- Counties: Seminole

Area
  - Total: 1.4 sq mi (3.6 km^{2})
  - Land: 1.4 sq mi (3.6 km^{2})
  - Water: 0 sq mi (0 km^{2})
- Elevation: 26 ft (7.9 m)

Population (2020)
  - Total: 1,524
  - Density: 1,100/sq mi (420/km^{2})
- Time zone: UTC-5 (Eastern (EST))
  - Summer (DST): UTC-4 (EDT)
- GNIS feature ID: 2403289

Midway is an unincorporated community and census designated place (CDP) in Seminole County, Florida, United States. The population was 1,524 at the 2020 census. It is part of the Orlando–Kissimmee–Sanford Metropolitan Statistical Area. The name Midway is the shortened version of its initial name “The Midway Point” because it was the middle point between two wells located on Sipes Avenue, used to drink from and water livestock.

== Urban Development ==
Since the 2010s, Midway has experienced significant residential and commercial development. Community advocates and the Midway Coalition have expressed concerns regarding the fast growth near the historic community.

== History ==
Midway started as migrant settlement in the late 19th and early 20th centuries, with some Black families living in as early as the 1880s. The Seminole County agricultural boom later drew many African American workers. Whose arrival significantly shaped Midway’s agricultural development.

== Geography ==
According to the United States Census Bureau, the CDP has a total area of 3.6 km^{2} (1.4 mi^{2}), all land. This CDP is also on State Road 46.

== Demographics ==
Midway CDP, Seminole County, Florida – Racial and ethnic composition Note: the U.S. census treats Hispanic/Latino as an ethnic category. This table excludes Latinos from the racial categories and assigns them to a separate category. Hispanics/Latinos may be of any race.
Race / Ethnicity (NH = Non-Hispanic)	Pop 2000	Pop 2010	Pop 2020	% 2000	% 2010	% 2020
White alone (NH)	60	124	74	3.50%	7.27%	4.86%
Black or African American alone (NH)	1,603	1,432	1,237	93.52%	83.99%	81.17%
Native American or Alaska Native alone (NH)	1	2	3	0.06%	0.12%	0.20%
Asian alone (NH)	10	12	20	0.58%	0.70%	1.31%
Native Hawaiian or Pacific Islander alone (NH)	0	0	1	0.00%	0.00%	0.07%
Other race alone (NH)	3	5	2	0.18%	0.29%	0.13%
Mixed race or Multiracial (NH)	18	26	51	1.05%	1.52%	3.35%
Hispanic or Latino (any race)	19	104	136	1.11%	6.10%	8.92%
Total	1,714	1,705	1,524	100.00%	100.00%	100.00%

As of the census of 2000, there were 1,714 people, 583 households, and 412 families residing in the CDP. The population density was 476.1/km^{2} (1,232.0/mi^{2}). There were 625 housing units at an average density of 173.6/km^{2} (449.3/mi^{2}). The racial makeup of the CDP was 3.85% White, 93.58% African American, 0.06% Native American, 0.58% Asian, 0.76% from other races, and 1.17% from two or more races. Hispanic or Latino of any race were 1.11% of the population.

There were 583 households, out of which 27.8% had children under the age of 18 living with them, 31.6% were married couples living together, 31.7% had a female householder with no husband present, and 29.2% were non-families. 24.4% of all households were made up of individuals, and 11.1% had someone living alone who was 65 years of age or older. The average household size was 2.94 and the average family size was 3.52.

In the CDP, the population was spread out, with 30.0% under the age of 18, 9.2% from 18 to 24, 25.3% from 25 to 44, 21.6% from 45 to 64, and 13.8% who were 65 years of age or older. The median age was 34 years. For every 100 females, there were 84.9 males. For every 100 females age 18 and over, there were 78.3 males.

The median income for a household in the CDP was $25,406, and the median income for a family was $27,243. Males had a median income of $23,281 versus $18,902 for females. The per capita income for the CDP was $11,800. About 22.0% of families and 26.0% of the population were below the poverty line, including 39.2% of those under age 18 and 7.0% of those age 65 or over.
