= Florida State Road 126 =

State highway in Florida, United States

State Road 126
- Florida Road 126 highlighted in red

Route information
- Maintained by FDOT
- Length: 2.373 mi (3.819 km)

Major junctions
- West end: SR 13 in Jacksonville
- US 1 in Jacksonville; I-95 in Jacksonville; US 90 in Jacksonville
- East end: US 1 Alt. in Jacksonville

Location
- Country: United States
- State: Florida
- Counties: Duval

Highway system
- Florida State Highway System; Interstate; US; State; Former; Pre‑1945; Toll; Scenic
← SR 123	→ SR 128
← SR 228	→ SR 230

State Road 126 (SR 126) is a 2.373-mile-long (3.819 km) state highway in southern Jacksonville, in the U.S. state of Florida, traveling along Emerson Street. It travels from SR 13 (Hendricks Avenue) east across U.S. Route 1 (US 1; SR 5; Philips Highway) and Interstate 95 (I-95; SR 9). East of I-95, SR 126 splits from Emerson Street, turning northeast on the beginning of the Emerson Expressway (originally the Emerson Leg of the Hart Bridge Expressway). SR 126 ends where the Emerson Expressway becomes a divided freeway. (Emerson Street continues east as a city street to Spring Glen Road just south of US 90 (Beach Boulevard; SR 212).

== State Road 228A ==
State Road 228A
- Location: Jacksonville
- Length: 0.930 mi (1,497 m)

The rest of the Emerson Expressway is the unsigned 0.930-mile-long (1.497 km) State Road 228A (SR 228A), traveling roughly north from the end of SR 126 to a merge with SR 228 (Hart Bridge Expressway). Other than at SR 228, it has one interchange – a full six-ramp partial cloverleaf at U.S. Route 90 (US 90; SR 212; Beach Boulevard).

The part of SR 126 east of US 1, and the whole of SR 228A, is signed (concurrently in the case of SR 126) as part of US 1 Alternate (US 1 Alt.). SR 126/Emerson Street is the only non-freeway section of US 1 Alt., which bypasses Downtown Jacksonville to the east via the Hart Bridge.

== Major intersections ==
The entire route is in Jacksonville, Duval County.

mi	km	Destinations	Notes
0.000	0.000	SR 13 (Hendricks Avenue)	Western terminus of SR 126
1.084	1.745	US 1 (Philips Highway / SR 5) – Downtown Jacksonville, St. Augustine	Southern end of US 1 Alt. concurrency
1.400	2.253	I-95 (SR 9) – Downtown Jacksonville, St. Augustine	I-95 exit 347
2.373	3.819	Eastern terminus of SR 126; southern terminus of SR 228A	
2.570	4.136	US 90 (Beach Boulevard / SR 212)	
3.303	5.316	US 1 Alt. north (Hart Bridge / SR 228 west) to I-95 / SR 10 (Atlantic Boulevard)	Northern end of US 1 Alt. concurrency; northern terminus of SR 228A
1.000 mi = 1.609 km; 1.000 km = 0.621 mi: Concurrency terminus; Route transition
