= Special routes of U.S. Route 1 =

A list of routes of U.S. Route 1

Special routes of U.S. Route 1

Highway system
- United States Numbered Highway System; List; Special; Divided

Several special routes of U.S. Route 1 (US 1) exist, from Florida to Maine. In order from south to north, separated by type, these special routes are as follows.

== Alternate routes ==
=== Jacksonville alternate route ===
U.S. Highway 1 Alternate
- Location: Jacksonville, Florida
- Length: 7.563 mi (12.171 km)

U.S. Highway 1 Alternate (US 1 Alt.) is an alternate U.S. Highway in Jacksonville, Florida. It bypasses downtown to the east via the Hart Bridge, running mostly on freeways.

Like all American Association of State Highway and Transportation Officials (AASHTO)-designated highways in Florida, US 1 Alt. always carries a Florida Department of Transportation (FDOT)-designated state road number, be it signed or unsigned:

- State Road 126 (SR 126) from Philips Highway (US 1/SR 5) to the south end of the Hart Expressway
- SR 228A from the end of the Hart Expressway to the junction with the Commodore Point Expressway (SR 228 east)
- SR 228 from the north end of the Hart Expressway to the Downtown Jacksonville exit (SR 228 west) via the Hart Bridge
- SR 115A from the Downtown Jacksonville exit to the junction with the Martin Luther King Jr. Parkway (SR 115 south)
- SR 115 from the junction with the Martin Luther King Jr. Parkway to the route's northern terminus at US 1/US 17 (SR 5/SR 15/SR 115 north)

==== Major intersections ====
The entire route is in Jacksonville, Duval County.

mi	km	Destinations	Notes
0.000	0.000	US 1 (Philips Highway / SR 5) / SR 126 west (Emerson Street) – Downtown Jacksonville, St. Augustine	
0.32	0.51	I-95 (SR 9) – Downtown Jacksonville, St. Augustine	I-95 exit 347
1.289	2.074	north end of SR 126 overlap; south end of SR 228A overlap and of freeway	
1.49	2.40	US 90 (Beach Boulevard / SR 212)	
2.219	3.571	To US 90 east (Beach Boulevard via SR 228 east) / SR 109 (University Boulevard)	southbound exit and northbound entrance; north end of SR 228A overlap; south end of SR 228 overlap
2.53	4.07	SR 10 (Atlantic Boulevard) / Art Museum Drive	
2.781– 3.517	4.476– 5.660	Hart Bridge over St. Johns River	
3.626	5.835	Downtown Jacksonville (SR 228 west)	northbound exit and southbound entrance; north end of SR 228 overlap; south end of SR 115A overlap
4.0	6.4	Sports Complex (Duval Street)	
4.59	7.39	SR 115 south (Mathews Bridge) – Arlington, Jax Beaches, Sports Complex	southbound exit and northbound entrance; north end of SR 115A overlap; south end of SR 115 overlap
see MLK Parkway (mile 0.34-3.08)
7.563	12.171	US 1 / US 17 (Main Street / SR 5 / SR 115 north)	
1.000 mi = 1.609 km; 1.000 km = 0.621 mi

=== Washington alternate route ===
U.S. Route 1 Alternate
- Location: Washington, DC–Hyattsville, Maryland
- Length: 6.8 mi (10.9 km)

U.S. Route 1 Bypass
- Location: Washington, DC

U.S. Route 1 Alternate (US 1 Alt.) is an alternate route forming a loop off US 1 between Washington, D.C. and Hyattsville, Maryland.

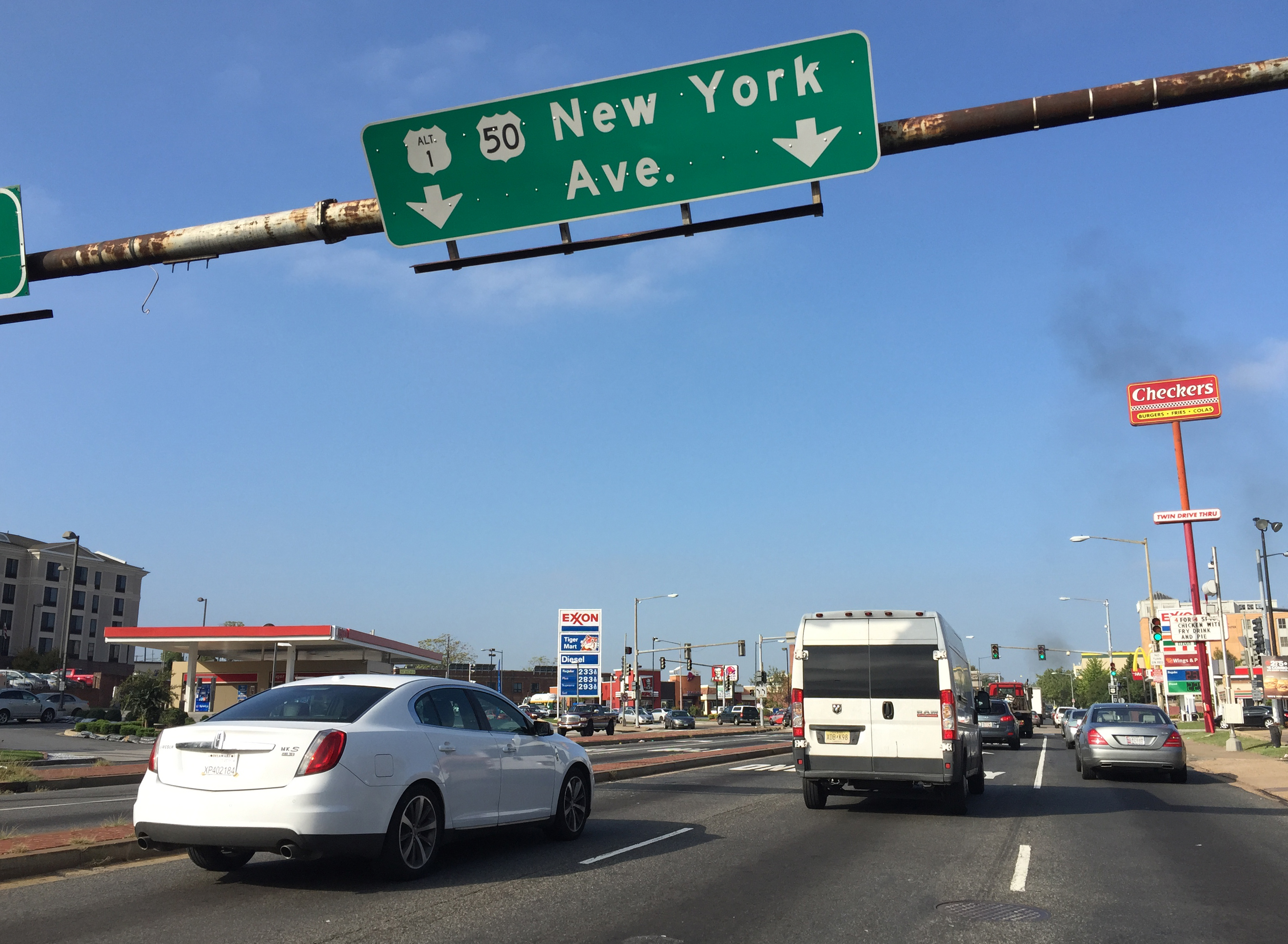
View south along US 1 Alt. and west along US 50 in Washington DC

==== Route description ====
In DC, US 1 Alt. splits from US 1 at the intersection of Constitution Avenue NW and 6th Street NW. US 1 goes up 6th Street NW on its way to the intersection of Rhode Island Avenue NW. US 1 Alt. stays on Constitution Avenue NW/NE as it traverses Capitol Hill, then follows Maryland Avenue NE, going around Stanton Park, to the Starburst Intersection comprising Maryland Avenue, Florida Avenue, H Street, Bladensburg Road, 15th Street NE, and the DC Streetcar line. US 1 Alt. then follows Bladensburg Road Northeast, which takes it into Prince George's County, Maryland, after an at-grade intersection with New York Avenue NE (US 50) and after passing under Amtrak's Northeast Corridor. After passing through Colmar Manor and Cottage City, the road enters Bladensburg and turns onto Baltimore Avenue toward Hyattsville, where it rejoins US 1 at Rhode Island Avenue.

US 1 Alt. crosses Eastern Avenue NE and enters the state of Maryland from DC in Prince George's County. The route heads northeast along the partially four-lane divided Bladensburg Road passing industrial areas and warehouses on the northwest and the Fort Lincoln Funeral Home and Cemetery on the southeast straddling the southeastern boundary of the town of Cottage City. US 1 Alt. crosses over Dueling Creek adjacent to Bladensburg Dueling Grounds on the southeast before heading into a commercial area where the route begins to follow the northwestern boundary of the town of Colmar Manor. In this area, the route insects the southern terminus of Maryland Route 208 (MD 208; 38th Street), before continuing along the town line and passing through a mix of residential and commercial areas. US 1 Alt. leaves the boundary between Colmar Manor and Cottage City as it crosses over the Anacostia River just to the southeast of the confluence between its Northeast and Northwest branches and enters the town of Bladensburg. Immediately after crossing the river, the route's median for its directional Y intersection with the eastern terminus of MD 450 (Annapolis Road), which is the old alignment of US 50 in the capital region of Maryland which heads east into downtown Bladensburg. In the middle of the intersection is a Maryland memorial for World War I soldiers known as the Peace Cross.

Past MD 450, US 1 Alt. curves north and its name changes to Baltimore Avenue passing industrial areas on the east and the Old Port of Bladensburg Community Park on the west. The route leaves Bladensburg at its crossing over the Northeast Branch and enters the city of Hyattsville. The route narrows to a two-lane undivided road and continues through a mix of residential, commercial, and industrial areas. US 1 Alt. reaches an at-grade railroad crossing with a component of the Y junction between CSX Transportation's Capital Subdivision line and its Alexandria Extension. A short distance past the crossing, the route enters a long bridge with a sweeping curve that crosses over the Capital Subdivision before the route reaches its northern terminus at US 1 (Baltimore Avenue) in downtown Hyattsville. Baltimore Avenue turns northward on US 1, taking over that route name from US 1 Alt. through the northern suburbs of Prince George's County including Riverdale Park, University Park, College Park, Beltsville, and Laurel.

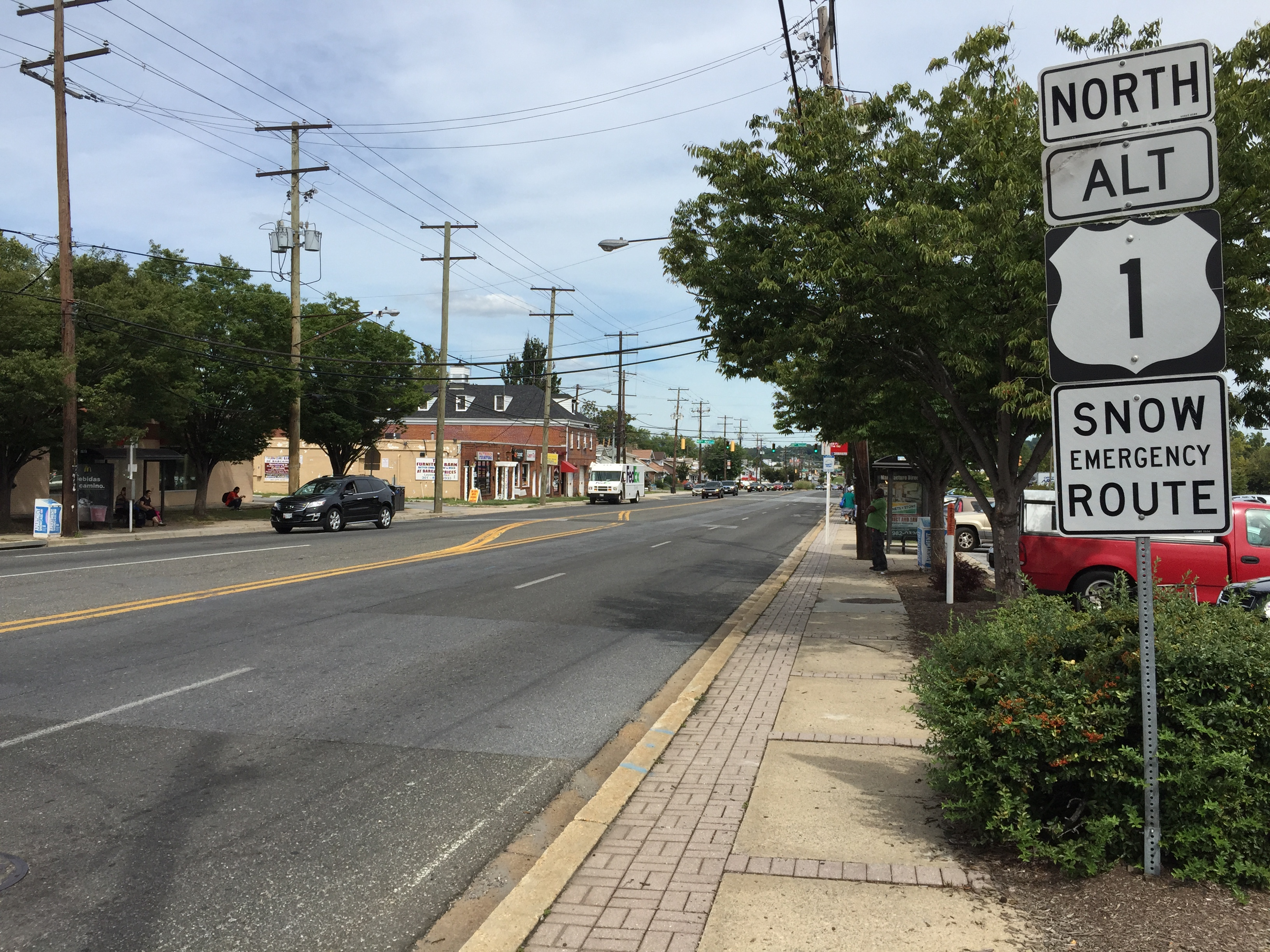
View north along US 1 Alt. at MD 208 in Colmar Manor, Maryland

==== History ====
In the 1940s, this route was known as U.S. Route 1 Bypass (US 1 Byp.) and was cosigned with U.S. Route 50 Alternate (US 50 Alt.) and MD 411. In the 1960s, this route went from 14th Street & D Street S.W. up to Independence Ave. where it would be co-signed with U.S. Route 50 as it went up Maryland Ave., 3rd St., and New York Ave. It then started following a portion of the current route at New York Ave. & Bladensburg Rd. until it met back up with U.S. 1.

==== Major intersections ====
State	County	Location	mi	km	Destinations	Notes
District of Columbia	Washington	Federal Triangle	0.0	0.0	US 1 / US 50 (Constitution Avenue / 6th Street)	
District of Columbia	Washington	Federal Triangle	0.1	0.16	Pennsylvania Avenue	
District of Columbia	Washington	Capitol Hill	1.2	1.9	Massachusetts Avenue – Eastern Market	Stanton Park
District of Columbia	Washington	Near Northeast–Kingman Park	2.2	3.5	Florida Avenue west / H Street west / Benning Road east	Starburst Intersection; no southbound left turn onto Benning Road
District of Columbia	Washington	Gateway	3.5	5.6	US 50 (New York Avenue) to US 1 south	No left turns onto New York Avenue
Maryland	Prince George's	Bladensburg	5.8	9.3	MD 450 east (Annapolis Road)	Western terminus of MD 450
Maryland	Prince George's	Hyattsville	6.8	10.9	US 1 (Baltimore Avenue)	
1.000 mi = 1.609 km; 1.000 km = 0.621 mi: Incomplete access

=== Baltimore alternate route ===
U.S. Route 1 Alternate
- Location: Baltimore, Maryland
- Length: 3.92 mi (6.31 km)

U.S. Route 1 Alternate (US 1 Alt.) is a 3.92-mile-long (6.31 km) alternate route forming a loop off US 1 between Arbutus and Baltimore, Maryland. US 1 Alt. serves the southwestern Baltimore County community of Halethorpe and connects US 1 with full-access interchanges with Interstate 95 (I-95) and I-695.

== Business routes ==
=== St. Augustine business loop ===
U.S. Highway 1 Business
- Location: St. Augustine, Florida
- Length: 3.243 mi (5.219 km)
- Existed: c. 1959–present

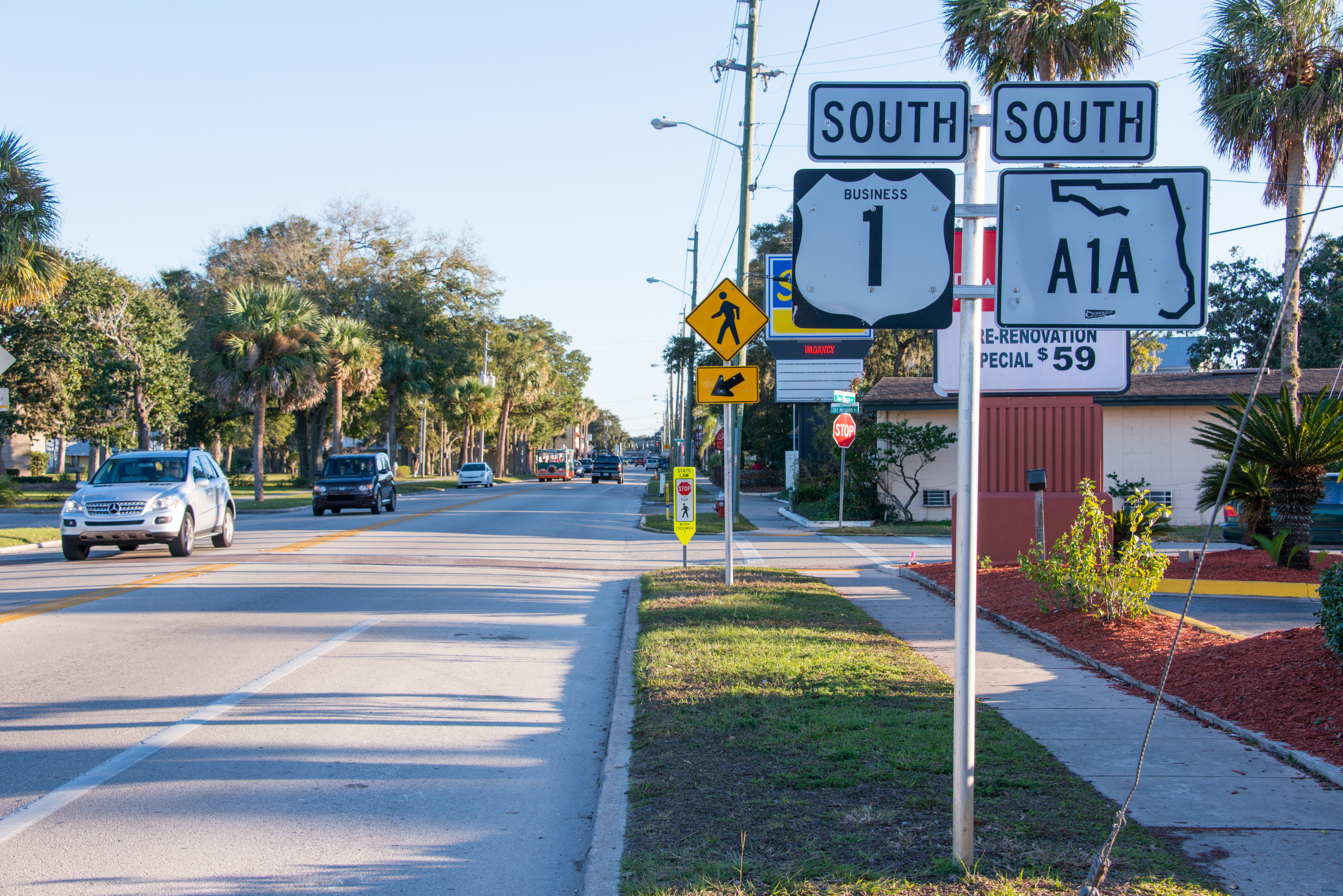
Southbound San Marco Avenue, December 2012

U.S. Highway 1 Business (US 1 Bus.) in St. Augustine, Florida, is a business route of US 1. From its southern terminus at US 1 to the intersection with SR 16, it carries the hidden FDOT designation of State Road 5A (SR 5A). The segment from SR 16 to the northern terminus at US 1 is maintained by the City of St. Augustine and is the only AASHTO-defined road in Florida that is not under state maintenance.

US 1 Bus. begins at the intersection of US 1 and King Street (County Road 214, or CR 214). US 1 Bus. travels east on King Street, with a short water crossing of the San Sebastian River two blocks east of US 1. The route continues, passing the southern end of Flagler College and then becoming a one-way pair for four blocks, with King Street taking eastbound traffic and Cathedral Place, one block north, taking westbound traffic. At the intersection with SR A1A just west of the Bridge of Lions toward Anastasia Island, US 1 Bus. heads north as a two-way road, starting a concurrency with SR A1A, now known as North Ocean Boulevard, going through the heart of St. Augustine. US 1 Bus. and SR A1A run along the west shore of the Matanzas River then curves to the northwest in front of the Castillo de San Marcos. At West Castillo Drive, the name changes to San Marco Avenue. At May Street, SR A1A heads east, splitting off from US 1 Bus. A bit further north, it intersects with the eastern terminus of SR 16 at Picolata Road. Six blocks to the north, US 1 Bus. terminates at US 1.

==== Major intersections ====
The entire route is in St. Augustine, St. Johns County.

mi	km	Destinations	Notes
0.000	0.000	US 1 (Ponce de Leon Boulevard / SR 5) / King Street (CR 214 west)	south end of SR 5A and concurrency
		King Street Bridge over the San Sebastian River	
0.873	1.405	SR A1A south – Beaches	south end of SR A1A overlap
2.159	3.475	To San Carlos Avenue / US 1	
2.191	3.526	SR A1A north (May Street) – Vilano Beach, Jax Beaches	north end of SR A1A overlap
2.737	4.405	SR 16 west (Picolata Road) – Green Cove Springs	north end of SR 5A and concurrency; north end of state maintenance
3.243	5.219	US 1 (North Ponce de Leon Boulevard / SR 5)	
1.000 mi = 1.609 km; 1.000 km = 0.621 mi: Concurrency terminus

=== Waycross business loop ===
U.S. Highway 1 Business
- Location: Waycross, Georgia
- Length: 9.622 mi (15.485 km)
- Existed: 1996–present

U.S. Highway 1 Business (US 1 Bus.) is a 9.622-mile-long (15.485 km) business route of US 1 partially in the city limits of Waycross, Georgia. It is concurrent with US 23 Bus. and State Route 4 Bus. (SR 4 Bus.) for its entire length.

US 1 Bus./US 23 Bus./SR 4 Bus. begins at an intersection with US 1/US 23/SR 4 (known as Memorial Drive south of this intersection and South Georgia Parkway west of it) and US 82/SR 520 (also known as South Georgia Parkway). The business routes travel northwest on Memorial Drive. The green traffic island on the north-northeast of the intersection is named the Millie DeShazo Triangle. They extend into the heart of Waycross, while the mainline route of US 1/US 23/SR 4 heads west across the southern portion of the city. They immediately curve to the west-northwest and begin paralleling CSX Transportation's Brunswick Subdivision. Just past Harrison Street, they pass Memorial Stadium. On a curve to a nearly due west direction, they leave the CSX Transportation tracks and cross over the city drainage canal. They curve to the northwest and travel under a railroad bridge for CSX Transportation's Jesup Subdivision. Immediately after this bridge is an intersection with US 84/SR 38 (Plant Avenue) and the eastern terminus of Carswell Avenue. The business routes turn to the right and travel northeast on a concurrency with US 84/SR 38 for approximately 1,000 feet (300 m). The five highways immediately begin paralleling the Jesup Subdivision and pass an office of the Georgia Department of Labor. US 1 Bus./US 23 Bus./SR 4 Bus. then turns left onto State Street, also signed as Ossie Davis Parkway, and travel to the northwest. They curve to the north-northwest and pass Wacona Elementary School. An intersection with Tebeau Street leads to a Mayo Clinic hospital. The three highways curve to the north-northwest. Between Charlton and Clough streets, the southbound lanes meet the northern terminus of Johnson Avenue, a one-way street, at a partial interchange. Just north of Abner Street, they begin paralleling another CSX Transportation rail line, specifically the Fitzgerald Subdivision. They cross over Kettle Creek, where they leave the city limits of Waycross. They curve to the west-northwest and leave the rail line. An intersection with the northern terminus of Airport road leads to the Erin Johnson Softball Complex, Ware State Prison, St. Illa Substance Abuse Center, the Ware County Sheriff's Office, and the Southland Waste Transfer Station. This intersection is just north of Waycross–Ware County Airport. They continue in a northwesterly direction and then reach their northern terminus, a second intersection with the US 1/US 23/SR 4 mainline. Except for the far northern end, the entire length of US 1 Bus. is part of the National Highway System, a system of routes determined to be the most important for the nation's economy, mobility, and defense.

US 1 Bus./SR 4 Bus. was established in 1996, replacing the old mainline US 1/SR 4 through Waycross, via Memorial Drive, Plant Avenue, State Street, and Alma Highway.

==== Major intersections ====
The entire route is in Ware County.

Location	mi	km	Destinations	Notes
Waycross	0.000	0.000	US 1 / US 23 / SR 4 (Memorial Drive / South Georgia Parkway) / US 82 / SR 520 (South Georgia Parkway) / US 23 Bus. begins / SR 4 Bus. begins – Folkston, Jacksonville, Brunswick	Southern terminus of US 1 Bus./US 23 Bus./SR 4 Bus.; southern end of US 23 Bus./SR 4 Bus. concurrency
Waycross	1.212	1.951	US 84 west / SR 38 west (Plant Avenue) / Carswell Avenue west – Homerville, Pearson, Visitor information center	Southern end of US 84/SR 38 concurrency; eastern terminus of Carswell Avenue
Waycross	1.399	2.251	US 84 east / SR 38 east (Plant Avenue) – Jesup	Northern end of US 84/SR 38 concurrency
Waycross			Johnson Avenue south	No access from northbound US 1 Bus./US 23 Bus./SR 4 Bus. to Johnson Avenue, a one-way street, or vice versa; northern terminus of Johnson Avenue; interchange
	9.622	15.485	US 1 / US 23 / SR 4 (Waycross Bypass / Dixie Highway) / US 23 Bus. ends / SR 4 Bus. ends	Northern terminus of US 1 Bus./US 23 Bus./SR 4 Bus.; northern end of US 1 Bus./US 23 Bus. concurrency
1.000 mi = 1.609 km; 1.000 km = 0.621 mi: Concurrency terminus

=== Swainsboro business loop ===
U.S. Highway 1 Business
- Location: Swainsboro, Georgia
- Length: 7.876 mi (12.675 km)
- Existed: 2004–present

U.S. Highway 1 Business (US 1 Bus.) is a 7.876-mile-long (12.675 km) business route of US 1 that is partially within the city limits of Swainsboro, Georgia. It is concurrent with SR 4 Bus. for its entire length.

US 1 Bus. and SR 4 Bus. begin at an intersection with US 1/SR 4/SR 57 south of Swainsboro. They travel to the north-northeast on South Main Street and immediately curve to the north-northwest. Just before an intersection with both the eastern terminus of Mixon Road and the western terminus of Quick Road, they curve back to the north-northeast. Just before an intersection with the eastern terminus of Gary Road, they curve to a nearly due north direction. Just north of this intersection, they enter the city. Just south of an intersection with the western terminus of Tiger Trail, they pass Swainsboro High School. Just south of an intersection with Glenwood Road, they begin a curve to the northwest. An intersection with Meadowlake Parkway leads to East Georgia State College. Between this intersection and one with the eastern terminus of Harmon Drive, they skirt along the northeastern edge of Harmon Park. The business routes then curve to the northwest. In downtown is an intersection with US 80/SR 26/SR 56 (signed as West and East Main Street, while US 1 Bus./SR 4 Bus. are signed as South and North Main Street). US 1 Bus. and SR 4 Bus. continue to the northwest and leave the city limits of Swainsboro. They pass an office of the Georgia State Patrol. Just past an intersection with the eastern terminus of Stallion Road, they curve to the west-northwest just before reaching the northern terminus of both highways, another intersection with the US 1/SR 4 mainline. The entire length of US 1 Bus. is part of the National Highway System, a system of routes determined to be the most important for the nation's economy, mobility, and defense.

In 2003, a western bypass of Swainsboro was proposed. The next year, US 1/SR 4 were shifted onto this bypass. Their former path through the city was redesignated as US 1 Bus./SR 4 Bus.

==== Major intersections ====
The entire route is in Emanuel County.

Location	mi	km	Destinations	Notes
	0.000	0.000	US 1 / SR 4 / SR 57 (South Main Street)	Southern terminus of US 1 Bus./SR 4 Bus.; southern end of SR 4 Bus. concurrency
Swainsboro	4.204	6.766	US 80 / SR 56 (Main Street / SR 26) – Dublin, Statesboro, Swainsboro Technical College	
	7.876	12.675	US 1 / SR 4 – Lyons, Wadley	Northern terminus of US 1 Bus./SR 4 Bus.; northern end of SR 4 Bus. concurrency
1.000 mi = 1.609 km; 1.000 km = 0.621 mi

=== Wadley business loop ===
U.S. Highway 1 Business
- Location: Wadley, Georgia
- Length: 3.645 mi (5.866 km)
- Existed: 1967–present
- History: designated SR 4 Bus. in 1966

U.S. Highway 1 Business (US 1 Bus.) is a 3.645-mile-long (5.866 km) business route of US 1 that is mostly within the city limits of Wadley, Georgia. It is concurrent with SR 4 Bus. for its entire length. It travels north through the heart of downtown, while the main route of US 1/SR 4 heads through the eastern part of the city.

US 1 Bus. and SR 4 Bus. begin at an intersection with the US 1/SR 4 mainline just south of the city limits of Wadley. Here, the roadway continues as Kennedy Road. They travel to the west-northwest and immediately curve to the north-northwest. Just south of an intersection with the eastern terminus of Coleman Chapel Road, they curve to a nearly due north direction. Almost immediately, they cross over the Williamson Swamp Creek and enter Wadley. Between an intersection with the southern segment of Railroad Street and an intersection with the eastern terminus of the northern segment of Railroad Street and the southern terminus of Wall Street, the business routes cross over two separate railroad tracks of the Norfolk Southern Railway. At an intersection with College Avenue, they pass the Wadley Public Library. From just south of Spann Street to just north of Smith Street, they travel to the east of Battle Pond. Between an intersection with the western terminus of Stevens Street and the Smith Street intersection, they cross over some railroad tracks of the former Louisville and Wadley Railroad. Just north of Smith Street, they leave the city limits of Wadley. Right after this point, they meet a former path of US 1. Just north of Wynder Smith Road, the northbound lanes curve to the northeast. Immediately, they reach their northern terminus, a second intersection with the US 1/SR 4 mainline.

In 1966, SR 4 Bus. was established from US 1/SR 4 south-southeast of Wadley to US 1/SR 4 north of it. The next year, US 1 Bus. was established on the route of SR 4 Bus.

==== Major intersections ====
The entire route is in Jefferson County.

Location	mi	km	Destinations	Notes
	0.000	0.000	US 1 / SR 4 – Swainsboro, Louisville	Southern terminus of US 1 Bus./SR 4 Bus.; southern end of SR 4 Bus. concurrency
Wadley	1.866	3.003	US 319 / SR 78 (Calhoun Street) – Bartow, Midville	
			Old US 1 north	Southern terminus of Old US 1; former US 1 north
	3.645	5.866	US 1 (SR 4)	Northern terminus of US 1 Bus./SR 4 Bus.; northern end of SR 4 Bus. concurrency
1.000 mi = 1.609 km; 1.000 km = 0.621 mi

=== Louisville business loop ===
U.S. Highway 1 Business
- Location: Louisville, Georgia
- Length: 2.900 mi (4.667 km)
- Existed: 1967–present
- History: designated SR 4 Bus. in 1966

U.S. Highway 1 Business (US 1 Bus.) is a 2.900-mile-long (4.667 km) business route of US 1 completely within the city limits of Louisville, Georgia. It is concurrent with SR 4 Bus. for its entire length.

US 1 Bus. and SR 4 Bus. begin at an intersection with the US 1/SR 4 mainline in the southeastern part of the city. This intersection is also the western terminus of Bob Culvern Road, which has no access to the business routes. This intersection is just west of Louisville Municipal Airport. The two highways travel to the northwest on East Broad Street and cross over Savannah Branch. Almost immediately, they intersect the northern terminus of a former segment of US 1. Between an intersection with the southwestern terminus of Pecan Street and one with Screven Street, they pass the Louisville Public Library, the Jefferson County Water Department, and the Jefferson County Chamber of Commerce. Just past Screven Street, they pass the Jefferson County Courthouse. At an intersection with Green Street, the roadway's northbound and southbound lanes diverge, with a grassy median. Here, they enter downtown. Just before an intersection with US 221/SR 24 (Peachtree Street), the northbound and southbound lanes come back together.

The business routes turn right onto US 221/SR 24. The four highways travel concurrently to the northeast. At West 9th Street, they pass an office of the Jefferson Electric Cooperative. Here, SR 24 splits off and then the other three highways pass Helen Clark Memorial Park and an office of Georgia Power. At an intersection with the southern terminus of 10th Street, the highways curve to the north-northeast. On this curve, they pass the Jefferson County Board of Education and the Louisville City Hall. Between an intersection with the eastern terminus of Academy Street and an intersection with the northwestern terminus of Forest Street, they pass Jefferson Hospital. A short distance north of Forest Street, the northbound lanes curve back to the northeast before intersecting US 1/SR 4/SR 17 in the northern part of the city. Here, US 1 Bus. and SR 4 Bus. end, while US 221 joins the mainline concurrency to the north.

In 1966, SR 4 through the city was shifted off of US 1. Its former path became SR 4 Bus. The next year, US 1 was shifted off of SR 4 Bus. and onto SR 4. Its former path was redesignated as US 1 Bus.

==== Major intersections ====
The entire route is in Louisville, Jefferson County.

mi	km	Destinations	Notes
0.000	0.000	US 1 / SR 4 / Bob Culvern Road east	Southern terminus of US 1 Bus./SR 4 Bus.; western terminus of Bob Culvern Road; southern end of US 1 Bus. concurrency; no access to Bob Culvern Road from US 1 Bus./SR 4 Bus. or vice versa
		Old Highway 1 south	Northern terminus of Old Highway 1; former US 1 south
1.607	2.586	US 221 south / SR 24 west – Bartow, Sandersville	Southern end of US 221 and SR 24 concurrencies
1.990	3.203	SR 24 east (West 9th Street) – Waynesboro	Northern end of SR 24 concurrency
2.900	4.667	US 1 / US 221 north / SR 17 (SR 4)	Northern terminus of US 1 Bus./SR 4 Bus.; northern end of US 221 concurrency
1.000 mi = 1.609 km; 1.000 km = 0.621 mi

=== Southern Pines business route ===
U.S. Highway 1 Business
- Location: Southern Pines, North Carolina

U.S. Route 1 Business (US 1 Bus.) is a business route and former segment of US 1 entirely within the city limits of Southern Pines, North Carolina. It runs along Old US 1, Broad Street, and Midland Road. The business route is concurrent with SR 2160 north of Morganton Road.

=== Vass–Cameron business loop ===
U.S. Highway 1 Business
- Location: Vass–Cameron, North Carolina
- Length: 9.4 mi (15.1 km)
- Existed: June 2005–present

U.S. Highway 1 Business (US 1 Bus.) was established in June 2005, replacing the old mainline US 1 through downtown Vass and Cameron, North Carolina.

==== Major intersections ====
The entire route is in Moore County.

Location	mi	km	Destinations	Notes
	0.0	0.0	US 1 – Sanford, Southern Pines	Southern terminus
Vass	1.3	2.1	NC 690 east (Main Street) / Union Church Road	Western terminus of NC 690
Cameron	6.3– 6.4	10.1– 10.3	NC 24 / NC 27	
	9.4	15.1	US 1 / Pine Forrest Road	Northern terminus
1.000 mi = 1.609 km; 1.000 km = 0.621 mi

=== Sanford business loop ===
U.S. Highway 1 Business
- Location: Sanford, North Carolina
- Length: 4.8 mi (7.7 km)
- Existed: 1960–present

U.S. Highway 1 Business (US 1 Bus.) was established in 1960 as a renumbering of US 1A through downtown Sanford, North Carolina, via Carthage Street and Hawkins Avenue. Between 1976 and 1978, US 1 Bus. it was rerouted onto North Carolina Highway 42 (NC 42) back to mainline US 1.

=== Henderson business loop ===
U.S. Highway 1 Business
- Location: Henderson, North Carolina
- Length: 10.6 mi (17.1 km)
- Existed: 1960–present

U.S. Highway 1 Business (US 1 Bus.) was established in 1960 as a renumbering of US 1A through Gill and downtown Henderson, North Carolina, via Raleigh Road and Garnett Street.

=== Fredericksburg business loop ===
U.S. Route 1 Business
- Location: Fredericksburg, Virginia

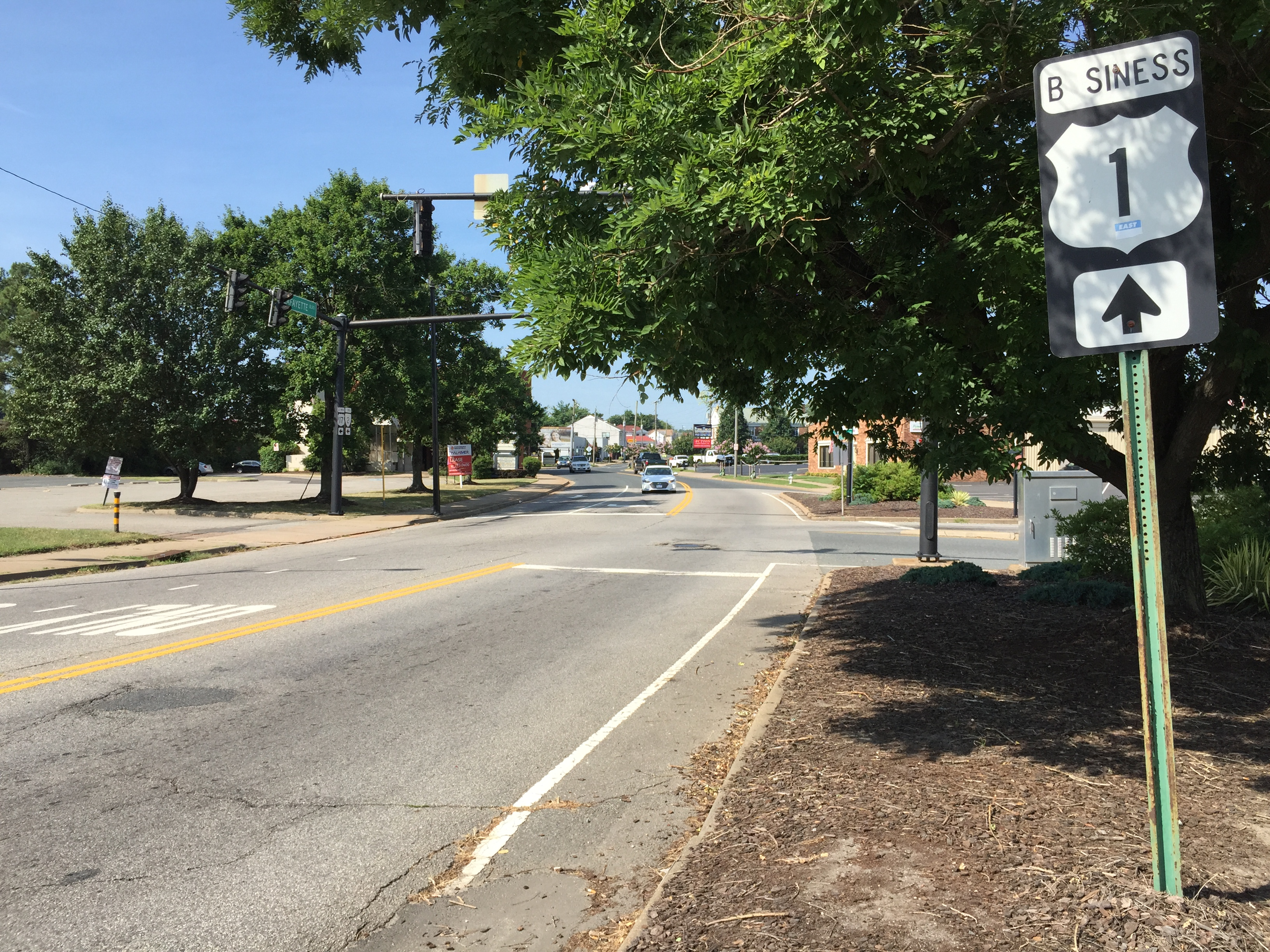
View south along US 1 Bus. in Fredericksburg, Virginia

U.S. Route 1 Business (US 1 Bus.) in the vicinity of Fredericksburg, Virginia, begins at US 1 and the east end of State Route 208 (SR 208) in Spotsylvania along Lafayette Boulevard and swerves northeast toward downtown Fredericksburg, but not before crossing an at-grade interchange with the Blue and Gray Parkway (SR 3). Curving more to the east as it passes by Fredericksburg National Cemetery, the road runs in front of Fredericksburg station where it joins the northbound and southbound streets carrying US 17 Bus., where they overlap until US 1 Bus. and Princess Anne Street end at US 1 south of the bridge over the Rappahannock River. US 17 Bus. continues northward to overlap US 1 before heading toward I-95/US 17.

=== Bel Air business loop ===
U.S. Route 1 Business
- Location: Bel Air, Maryland
- Length: 6.90 mi (11.10 km)

U.S. Route 1 Business (US 1 Bus.) is a 6.90-mile-long (11.10 km) business route of US 1 going through the town of Bel Air, Maryland. Before this route was put into service, US 1 went through Bel Air. It used to end at the north end of the Bel Air Bypass. In 2000, it was extended to the north end of the Hickory Bypass when it was built. The regular US 1 was moved to the new bypass.

=== Penndel business loop ===
U.S. Route 1 Business
- Location: Penndel, Pennsylvania
- Length: 8 mi (13 km)
- Existed: 1989–present

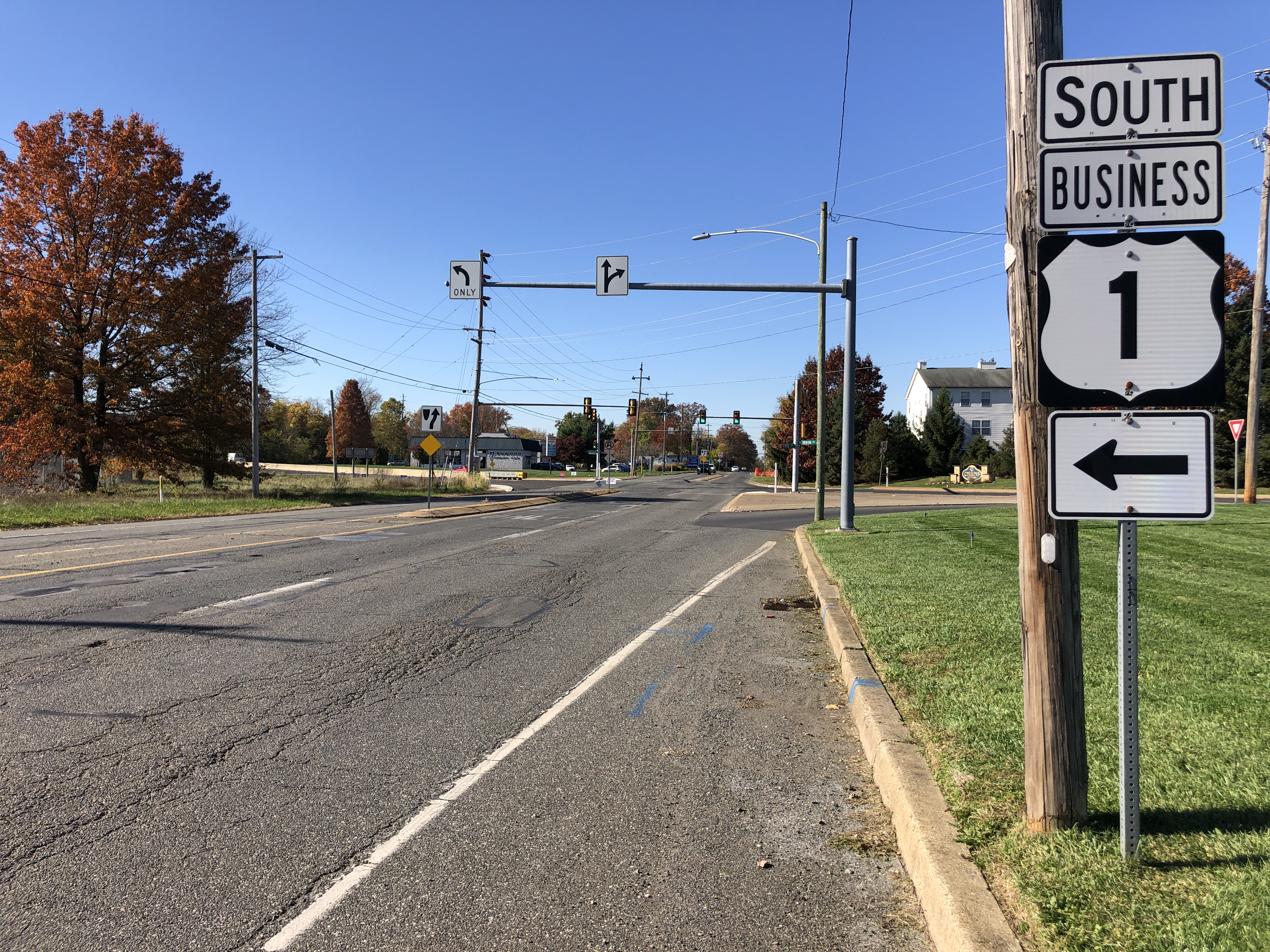
US 1 Bus. southbound approaching Trenton Avenue in Falls Township, Pennsylvania

U.S. Route 1 Business (US 1 Bus.) is an eight-mile-long (13 km) business route of US 1 in southeastern Penndel, Pennsylvania. The southern terminus of the route is at US 1 in the Bensalem Township community of Oakford, west of Penndel. The northern terminus is at US 1 north of the Falls Township community of Fallsington. US 1 Bus. runs along the Lincoln Highway for its entire length.

When a bypass of Penndel was completed to the north of the borough in 1989, US 1 was moved from the Lincoln Highway to the freeway, allowing US 1 Bus. to occupy the Lincoln Highway in its place.

==== Major intersections ====
The entire route is in Bucks County.

Location	mi	km	Destinations	Notes
Middletown Township			US 1 south – Philadelphia	Southern terminus
Penndel			PA 513 (Bellevue Avenue)	
Penndel			PA 413 north (Durham Road)	Southern end of PA 413 concurrency
Middletown Township			I-295 to I-95 south – Philadelphia, Trenton	Exit 3 on I-295
Middletown Township			PA 413 south (Veterans Highway)	Northern end of PA 413 concurrency
Middletown Township			PA 213 south (East Maple Avenue) – Langhorne	Northbound exit and southbound entrance; northern terminus of PA 213
Falls Township			To US 1 south – Philadelphia	Access via Woolston Drive
Falls Township			US 1 north to US 13 south – Morrisville, Trenton	Interchange; northern terminus
1.000 mi = 1.609 km; 1.000 km = 0.621 mi: Concurrency terminus

=== Trenton business loop ===
U.S. Route 1 Business
- Location: Trenton, New Jersey
- Length: 2.73 mi (4.39 km)

U.S. Route 1 Business (US 1 Bus.) is a 2.73-mile (4.39 km) business route of US 1 northeast of Trenton, New Jersey, running from an interchange with that route in Trenton to another interchange in Lawrence Township. On the border of Trenton and Lawrence Township, US 1 Bus. intersects northbound US 206 at the Brunswick Circle. The route is also signed through Trenton on what was once designated US 1 Alt., which continued over the Lower Trenton Bridge to Morrisville, Pennsylvania. The northern portion of what was US 1 Alt. in Pennsylvania is now State Route 2060 (SR 2060), while the southernmost section is part of Pennsylvania Route 32 (PA 32).

=== Warwick business route ===
U.S. Route 1 Business
- Location: Warwick, Rhode Island

=== Damariscotta–Newcastle business loop ===
U.S. Route 1 Business
- Location: Damariscotta–Newcastle, Maine
- Length: 3.3 mi (5.3 km)
- Existed: 1970–present

U.S. Route 1 Business (US 1 Bus.) was established in 1970, which goes through downtown Newcastle and Damariscotta, Maine, via Main Street. US 1 Bus. begins as an offshoot of US 1 southwest of Newcastle and proceeds into the town, where it meets the southern terminus of State Route 215 (SR 215). The route then turns to the east, crossing the Damariscotta River into Damariscotta. US 1 Bus. intersects the northern end of SR 129 and SR 130, which end overlapped. The route continues east through Damariscotta, before turning northeast and merging with its parent.

== Bypass routes ==
=== Portsmouth–Kittery bypass route ===
U.S. Route 1 Bypass
- Location: Portsmouth, New Hampshire–Kittery, Maine
- Length: 4.316 mi (6.946 km)
- Existed: 1940–present

U.S. Route 1 Bypass (US 1 Byp.) is a 4.316-mile-long (6.946 km) bypass of US 1 in Portsmouth, New Hampshire, and Kittery, Maine. Most of its north section, northeast of the Portsmouth Traffic Circle where it meets the Blue Star and Spaulding turnpikes, is built to rudimentary expressway standards, with no cross traffic but driveway access. The southern portion is similarly constructed, although there are two four-way intersections with traffic-lights just south of the circle and a third at its south end, just before intersecting with US 1.

The southern terminus is at US 1 in Portsmouth. The northern terminus is at US 1 in Kittery. Between its terminuses, US 1 Byp. intersects I-95, US 4, New Hampshire Route 16 (NH 16), and the Spaulding Turnpike in Portsmouth, as well as SR 103 in Kittery.

The bypass crosses the Piscataqua River on the 1940 Sarah Mildred Long Bridge, a lift bridge maintained by the Maine–New Hampshire Interstate Bridge Authority.

In New Hampshire, 2.756 miles (4.435 km) of the route exist, and, in Maine, 1.56 miles (2.51 km) exist.

== Connector routes ==
=== Lexington connector route ===
U.S. Highway 1 Connector
- North Church Street
- Location: Lexington, South Carolina
- Length: 0.230 mi (370 m)

U.S. Highway 1 Connector (US 1 Conn.) is a 0.230-mile (0.370 km) connector route that is entirely within the city limits of Lexington, South Carolina. It is a southbound-only highway, is completely concurrent with the eastbound lanes of South Carolina Highway 6 (SC 6), is known as North Church Street, and is an unsigned highway.

=== Columbia connector route ===
U.S. Highway 1 Connector
- Location: Columbia, South Carolina
- Length: 0.080 mi (129 m)

U.S. Highway 1 Connector (US 1 Conn.) is a 0.080-mile (0.129 km) connector route that is entirely within the city limits of Columbia, South Carolina. It connects SC 16 (Beltline Boulevard) with US 1 (Two Notch Road) in the northern part of the city. It is unnamed and is an unsigned highway.

== Truck routes ==
=== Aiken truck route ===
U.S. Highway 1 Truck
- Location: Aiken, South Carolina
- Length: 8.440 mi (13.583 km)
- Existed: 2000–present

U.S. Highway 1 Truck (US 1 Truck) is an 8.440-mile (13.583 km) truck route that bypasses the northern part of Aiken, South Carolina, via SC 118. It is entirely concurrent with SC 118 and US 78 Truck. It also has a concurrency with SC 19 Truck. It was established in 2000.

=== Camden truck route ===
U.S. Highway 1 Truck
- Location: Camden, South Carolina
- Length: 1.540 mi (2.478 km)

U.S. Highway 1 Truck (US 1 Truck) is a 1.540-mile (2.478 km) truck route of US 1 that exists entirely within the southern part of Camden, South Carolina. It uses parts of US 521 (Broad Street), York Street, and Mill Street to connect US 521 with US 1/SC 34 (East Dekalb Street). The York and Mill streets portion is entirely concurrent with SC 34 Truck. The southbound lanes of the York and Mill streets portion are also part of US 521 Truck, with no indication of US 1 Truck or SC 34 Truck; the northbound lanes have no indication of US 521 Truck.

=== Cheraw truck route ===
U.S. Highway 1 Truck
- Location: Cheraw, South Carolina
- Length: 3.230 mi (5.198 km)
- Existed: 2002–present

U.S. Highway 1 Truck (US 1 Truck) is a 3.230-mile (5.198 km) truck route that bypasses most of the city of Cheraw, South Carolina, to the east. It is known as Cash Road, Second Street, and Front Street and is concurrent with US 52 Truck. It was established in 2002.

=== West Grove alternate truck route ===
U.S. Route 1 Alternate Truck
- Location: West Grove, Pennsylvania

U.S. Route 1 Alternate Truck (US 1 Alt. Truck) is a southbound truck route around a weight-restricted bridge that carries the southbound lanes of the US 1 freeway over Guernsey Road in West Grove, Pennsylvania, on which trucks over 36 short tons (33 t; 32 long tons) and combination loads over 40 short tons (36 t; 36 long tons) are prohibited. The route follows PA 841, Evergreen Street, the Baltimore Pike, and PA 796.

=== Philadelphia alternate truck route ===
U.S. Route 1 Alternate Truck
- Location: Philadelphia, Pennsylvania

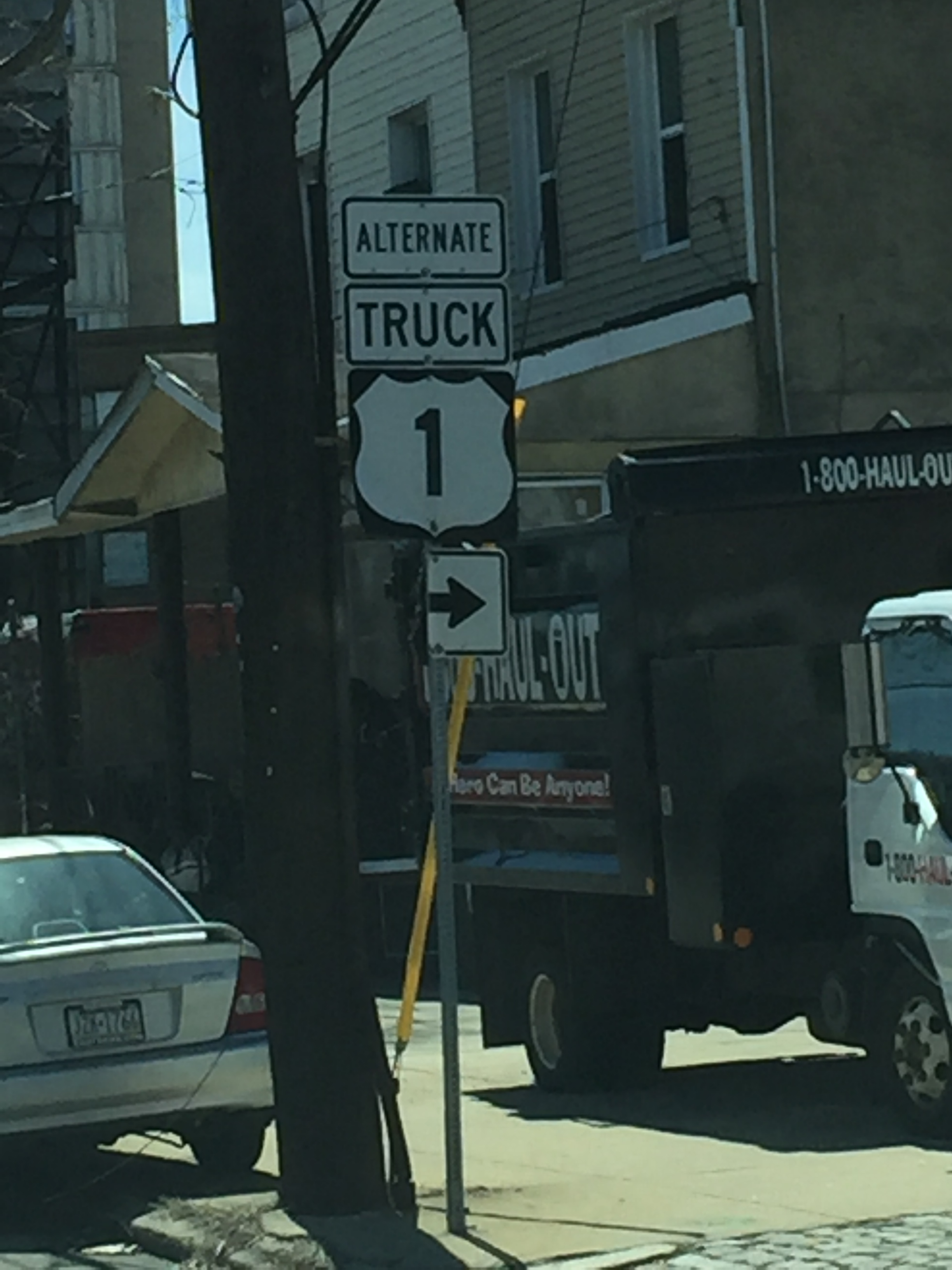
US 1 Alt. Truck in Philadelphia, Pennsylvania

U.S. Route 1 Alternate Truck (US 1 Alt. Truck) is a truck route around a weight-restricted bridge on US 1 over SEPTA's Cynwyd Line in Philadelphia, Pennsylvania, on which trucks over 36 short tons (33 t; 32 long tons) and combination loads over 40 short tons (36 t; 36 long tons) are prohibited. The route follows US 30 on Lancaster Avenue, Girard Avenue, Belmont Avenue, and a one-way pair along Belmont Avenue northbound and Conshohocken Avenue southbound.

=== Jersey City truck route ===
U.S. Route 1/9 Truck
- Location: Jersey City, New Jersey
- Length: 4.11 mi (6.61 km)
- Existed: 1953–present

U.S. Route 1/9 Truck (US 1/9 Truck) is a 4.11-mile (6.61 km) truck route of US 1/9 in northern New Jersey between Newark and Jersey City that bypasses the Pulaski Skyway, from which trucks are banned. The route heads east across the Passaic River into Kearny before crossing the Hackensack River into Jersey City, where the truck route turns north at the Route 440 intersection. It intersects Route 7 before turning east and ending at the Tonnele Circle with US 1/9 and Route 139. Prior to 1953, US 1/9 Truck was designated as Route 25T, designating a truck bypass of Route 25, which formerly followed US 1/9 on the Pulaski Skyway. (Note: 1953 renumbering)

== Former alternate routes ==
=== St. Augustine alternate route ===
U.S. Highway 1 Alternate
- Location: St. Augustine, Florida
- Existed: 1958–1960s

U.S. Highway 1 Alternate (US 1 Alt.) was an alternate route of US 1 in St. Augustine, Florida, between the 1950s and early 1970s. It began on King Street east of the San Sebastian River on Malaga Drive, then after the intersection of Carrera Street followed the east side of the Florida East Coast Railway main line along the San Sebastian River, moving further to the northeast until reaching San Marco Boulevard.

A realignment project for US 1 brought it east of what is today Old Dixie Highway near what is today San Lorenzo Cemetery, keeping the route closer to the west coast of the San Sebastian River, which also included a bridge over Oyster Pond. After crossing King Street, the new route made a right curve toward a new bridge over the river, then turned back to the north at Malaga Drive and Carrera Street.

Today, this route is part of mainline US 1. SR 5A was downgraded to a county road along the west side of US 1.

=== Former Jacksonville alternate route ===
U.S. Highway 1 Alternate
- Location: Jacksonville, Florida
- Length: 1.3 mi (2.1 km)
- Existed: 1958–1960

U.S. Highway 1 Alternate (US 1 Alt.) existed as an alternate route of US 1 in Jacksonville, Florida, between 1958 and 1960. It bypassed US 1/US 90 to the west via the Acosta Bridge, over the St. Johns River, and shared a brief concurrency with a former segment of former US 17 between Roosevelt Avenue and Bay Street, then ran straight north along Broad Street toward US 1/US 23. Today, this segment is simply part of SR 13.

== Former business routes ==
=== Florida City–Homestead business loop ===
U.S. Highway 1 Business
- Location: Florida City–Homestead, Florida
- Existed: mid-1960s–1968

U.S. Highway 1 Business (US 1 Bus.) was a business route of US 1 in southern Dade County, Florida, that was a part of US 1's original route through Florida City and Homestead. It was formed in the mid-1960s, when US 1's routing was shifted east, bypassing the central parts of the towns. It ran concurrently with SR 997 southernmost segment. It was deleted in 1968, and much of the route is under SR 997.

=== Raleigh business loop ===
U.S. Highway 1 Business
- Location: Raleigh, North Carolina
- Length: 7 mi (11 km)
- Existed: 1963–1975

U.S. Highway 1 Business (US 1 Bus.) was established in 1963, replacing the old US 1 through downtown Raleigh, North Carolina, via Hillsborough Street, McDowell and Dawson streets, Downtown Boulevard, and North Boulevard (today's Capital Boulevard). It was decommissioned in 1975.

=== Jersey City business spur ===
U.S. Route 1/9 Business
- Location: Jersey City, New Jersey
- Length: 2.77 mi (4.46 km)
- Existed: 1953–by 1990s

U.S. Route 1/9 Business (US 1/9 Bus.) was a 2.77-mile-long (4.46 km) former business route of US 1/9 in Jersey City, New Jersey, that ran between US 1/9 at the Tonnele Circle and Holland Tunnel across the Hudson River to New York City. The route was created in 1953, replacing what had been a part of Route 25. The business route was renumbered to Route 139 by the 1990s.

== Former bypass routes ==
=== Sanford bypass route ===
U.S. Highway 1 Bypass
- Location: Sanford, North Carolina

=== Raleigh bypass route ===
U.S. Highway 1 Bypass
- Location: Raleigh, North Carolina

=== Henderson bypass route ===
U.S. Highway 1 Bypass
- Location: Henderson, North Carolina

=== Trenton bypass route ===
U.S. Route 1 Bypass
- Location: Trenton, New Jersey

=== Swarthmore–Philadelphia bypass route ===
U.S. Route 1 Bypass
- Location: Swarthmore–Philadelphia, Pennsylvania

U.S. Route 1 Bypass (US 1 Byp.) was a bypass of a segment of US 1 from Swarthmore to Philadelphia, Pennsylvania. US 1 Byp. began at US 1 (Baltimore Pike) north of Swarthmore, heading north concurrent with PA 320. The route split from PA 320 by turning northeast onto State Road. US 1 Byp. continued northeast along Township Line Road, becoming concurrent with US 13 Byp. and intersecting PA 3 in Llanerch. The two routes continued northeast and became City Avenue, forming the border between Montgomery County to the northwest and Philadelphia to the southeast. Along City Avenue, the bypass route intersected US 30 Byp. (Haverford Road and Avenue), US 30, and PA 23 (Conshohocken State Road/Conshohocken Avenue). Upon crossing the Schuylkill River, the bypass routes intersected US 309 (Lincoln Drive) and US 422 Alt. (Ridge Avenue) and continued east along East River Drive. US 1 Byp./US 13 Byp. continued northeast along Hunting Park Avenue, intersecting US 309 Truck (Germantown Avenue) before ending at US 1/US 13/US 611 (Broad Street). US 1/US 13 continued northeast at this point on Roosevelt Boulevard. US 1 Byp. was first designated by 1940 to run from Swarthmore to Northeast Philadelphia, continuing past Broad Street along Roosevelt Boulevard. By 1950, Roosevelt Boulevard became mainline US 1. US 1 Byp. was decommissioned by 1960, having been replaced with mainline US 1 along State Road, Township Line Road, City Avenue, and Hunting Park Avenue.

==== Major intersections ====
County	Location	mi	km	Destinations	Notes
Delaware	Springfield Township			US 1 (Baltimore Pike) PA 320 south (Cedar Lane)	Southern terminus, south end of PA 320 overlap
Delaware	Springfield Township			PA 420 south (Woodland Avenue)	Northern terminus of PA 420
Delaware	Springfield Township			PA 320 north (Sproul Road)	North end of PA 320 overlap
Delaware	Upper Darby			US 13 Byp. south (Lansdowne Avenue) – Lansdowne	South end of US 13 Byp. overlap
Delaware	Upper Darby			PA 3 (West Chester Pike)	
Montgomery–Philadelphia county line	Lower Merion Township–Philadelphia line			US 30 Byp. (Haverford Road/Haverford Avenue)	
Montgomery–Philadelphia county line	Lower Merion Township–Philadelphia line			US 30 (Lancaster Avenue)	
Montgomery–Philadelphia county line	Lower Merion Township–Philadelphia line			PA 23 (Conshohocken State Road/Conshohocken Avenue)	
Philadelphia	Philadelphia			US 309 north (Lincoln Drive) US 422 Alt. west (Ridge Avenue)	Southern terminus of US 309, eastern terminus of US 422 Alt.
Philadelphia	Philadelphia			US 309 Truck north (Germantown Avenue)	Southern terminus of US 309 Truck
Philadelphia	Philadelphia			US 1 south / US 13 south / US 611 (Broad Street) US 1 north / US 13 north (Roosevelt Boulevard)	Northern terminus, north end of US 13 Byp. overlap
1.000 mi = 1.609 km; 1.000 km = 0.621 mi

=== Rockland bypass route ===
U.S. Route 1 Bypass
- Location: Rockland, Maine

=== Caribou bypass route ===
U.S. Route 1 Bypass
- Location: Caribou, Maine

== Former temporary routes ==
=== Newark–Jersey City temporary route ===
Temporary U.S. Route 1
- Location: Newark–Jersey City, New Jersey

== Former truck routes ==
=== Alexandria truck route ===
U.S. Route 1 Truck
- Location: Alexandria, Virginia

== See also ==
- List of special routes of the United States Numbered Highway System
- U.S. Route 1A
