= Florida State Road 228 =

Highway in Florida, USA

State Road 228
- SR 228 highlighted in red

Route information
- Maintained by FDOT
- Length: 32.532 mi (52.355 km)

Western section
- Length: 1.927 mi (3.101 km)
- West end: US 90 / CR 228 in Macclenny
- East end: I-10 / CR 228 southeast of Macclenny

Eastern section
- Length: 30.605 mi (49.254 km)
- West end: US 301 / CR 228 in Maxville
- Major intersections: SR 23 in Jacksonville; I-295 in Jacksonville; US 17 in Jacksonville; I-10 in Jacksonville; I-95 in Jacksonville
- East end: US 90 in Jacksonville

Location
- Country: United States
- State: Florida
- Counties: Baker, Duval

Highway system
- Florida State Highway System; Interstate; US; State; Former; Pre‑1945; Toll; Scenic
← SR 226	→ SR 228A

State Road 228 (SR 228) is a 32.532-mile-long (52.355 km) state highway in the northeastern part of the U.S. state of Florida. It exists in two distinct sections, separated by both Baker County Road 228 and Duval CR 228, which are former segments of SR 228.

The western segment of SR 228 exists in Macclenny, connecting US 90 and Baker CR 228 with Interstate 10 (I-10) at exit 336 and another instance of the county road.

Its main segment is in Jacksonville. This segment connects U.S. Route 301 (US 301) and Duval CR 228 in the far southwest corner of the city with US 90 in the Southside neighborhood of the city.

== Route description ==
=== Western segment ===
SR 228 begins at an intersection with U.S. Route 90 (US 90, Macclenny Avenue) in downtown Macclenny. At this intersection, the roadway continues as Baker County Road 228 (CR 228; North 5th Street). It heads south-southeast through the city, passing Macclenny City Hall and the Emily Taber Public Library. Around the intersection with Jonathan Street, the road curves to the southeast. It crosses over Turkey Creek before leaving Macclenny. Approximately 3,000 feet (910 m) after leaving the city, it meets its eastern terminus, an interchange with Interstate 10 (I-10) at exit 336. At this interchange, the roadway continues to the southeast as another instance of CR 228, this time known as Maxville–Macclenny Highway.

=== Eastern segment ===
==== Western terminus to Downtown ====
SR 228 resumes at an intersection with US 301 in the southwestern corner of Jacksonville. At this intersection, the roadway continues as Duval CR 228 (Maxville–Macclenny Highway). US 301/SR 228 travel concurrently to the south-southwest for about 1,000 feet (300 m), until SR 228 departs to the northeast on Normandy Boulevard. A short distance later, it meets the northern terminus of CR 217. Then, it travels through Cecil Center, passing the Cecil campus of Florida State College. It then has an interchange with SR 23 (First Coast Expressway). The highway passes by Herlong Recreational Airport, before meeting an interchange with I-295 (Jacksonville West Beltway). SR 228 passes Gravely Hill Cemetery and John D. Liverman Park. While passing the park, the highway crosses over Cedar River. Then, it intersects SR 103 (Lane Avenue South). After that, it begins to curve to the east. Near the intersection of Normandy Boulevard and Cassat Avenue was Normandy Mall, Jacksonville’s first fully enclosed shopping mall; it closed to the public in March 1994. At the intersection with Cassat Avenue, it takes on the Post Street name. At Hamilton Street, it heads northeast and curves back to the east past Edgewood Avenue. Then, it intersects SR 129 (McDuff Avenue). The two highways head concurrently to the south for about four blocks, to an intersection with US 17 (Roosevelt Boulevard). At this intersection, SR 129 meets its southern terminus, and SR 228 heads concurrently with US 17 to the northeast. Less than 1 mile (1.6 km) later, the two highways have an interchange with I-10. I-10/US 17/SR 228 heads concurrently to the east. At an interchange with I-95, I-10 meets its eastern terminus, while I-95/US 17/SR 228 head to the northeast, crossing over McCoy Creek. At an interchange with Union Street, US 17/SR 228 splits off to the east, concurrent with US 23. The three highways enter downtown.

==== Downtown to eastern terminus ====
At Main Street, they intersect US 1. Here, US 23 meets its southern terminus and SR 228 turns onto US 1 south, while US 17 turns onto US 1 north. One block later, US 90 (West Beaver Street) joins the concurrency. Four blocks farther to the south-southwest, SR 228 splits off onto West Monroe Avenue. One block to the east, at Ocean Street, it intersects the northbound lanes of US 1/US 90/SR 228. A short distance to the east-southeast, SR 228 meets the western terminus of the Hart Bridge Expressway, a freeway that connects downtown to the Southside neighborhood. Here, SR 228 joins with the expressway to the east-southeast. They pass VyStar Veterans Memorial Arena, EverBank Field, and WJCT, before US 1 Alternate (US 1 Alt.; Martin Luther King Jr. Parkway) joins the concurrency. The two highways cross over the St. Johns River on the Hart Bridge. Shortly after the bridge is an interchange with SR 10 (Atlantic Boulevard). Almost immediately, US 1 Alt. splits off onto Emerson Expressway. Then, SR 228 crosses over Little Pottsburg Creek. After that, it has an intersection with SR 109 (University Boulevard). The road continues to the east-southeast and curves to the southeast to meet its eastern terminus, an interchange with US 90 (Beach Boulevard).

=== National Highway System ===
There are two sections of SR 228 that is included as part of the National Highway System, a system of roadways important to the nation's economy, defense, and mobility (both of which are part of the eastern segment):

- From its western terminus to I-295
- The entire section that is concurrent with the Hart Bridge Expressway

== Major intersections ==
County	Location	mi	km	Destinations	Notes
Baker	Macclenny	0.000	0.000	SR 121 / CR 23B west	Western terminus of western segment of Baker CR 228; eastern terminus of CR 23B
Baker	Macclenny	1.194	1.922	US 90 (Macclenny Avenue / SR 10) – Baldwin, Glen St. Mary	Eastern terminus of Baker CR 228; western terminus of the western segment of SR 228
Baker	Macclenny	1.886	3.035	Lowder Street (CR 23A west)	Eastern terminus of CR 23A
Baker		3.03	4.88	I-10 (SR 8) – Jacksonville, Lake City	I-10 exit 336
Baker		3.121	5.023	Eastern terminus of western segment of SR 228; western terminus of eastern segment of Baker CR 228	
Duval	Maxville	10.979	17.669	US 301 north (SR 200 north) / CR 228 west	Eastern terminus of Duval CR 228; western terminus of eastern segment of SR 228; western end of US 301/SR 200 concurrency
Duval	Maxville	11.115	17.888	US 301 south (SR 200 south)	Eastern end of US 301/SR 200 concurrency
Duval	Jacksonville	12.619	20.308	CR 217 south	Northern terminus of western segment of CR 217
Duval	Jacksonville	15.823	25.465	Yellow Water Road (CR 217 north)	Southern terminus of eastern segment of CR 217
Duval	Jacksonville	19.699	31.702	New World Avenue (103rd Street) to SR 134 – FSCJ Cecil Center, Cecil Field	
Duval	Jacksonville	21.379	34.406	SR 23 to I-10	FL Toll 23 at exit 42
Duval	Jacksonville	22.290	35.872	To I-10 / Chaffee Road (CR 115C)	
Duval	Jacksonville	27.42	44.13	I-295 (SR 9A) to I-10 – Savannah, St. Augustine, Daytona Beach	I-295 exit 19
Duval	Jacksonville	28.679	46.154	SR 103 (Lane Avenue) to I-10	
Duval	Jacksonville	29.980	48.248	SR 111 (Cassat Avenue) to I-10	
Duval	Jacksonville	31.608	50.868	SR 129 north (McDuff Avenue)	Western end of SR 129 concurrency
Duval	Jacksonville	31.645	50.928	To US 17 south / Old Roosevelt Boulevard	
Duval	Jacksonville	31.781	51.147	US 17 south (Roosevelt Boulevard / SR 15) – NAS Jax	Eastern end of SR 129 concurrency; western end of US 17/SR 15 concurrency
Duval	Jacksonville	see US 17 (mile 282.275–286.263)			
Duval	Jacksonville	35.769	57.565	US 1 north / US 17 north (North Main Street / SR 5) / East Union Street (SR 139 south)	Eastern end of US 17/US 23/SR 139 concurrency; western end of US 1/SR 5 concurrency
Duval	Jacksonville	35.822	57.650	US 90 west (Beaver Street / SR 10)	Western end of US 90/SR 10 concurrency
Duval	Jacksonville	36.035	57.993	US 1 south / US 90 east (Main Street / SR 5 / SR 10)	East end of state maintenance; Eastern end of US 1/SR 5 and US 90/SR 10 concurrencies
Duval	Jacksonville	36.420	58.612	East Monroe Street to Duval Street – Sports Complex	Eastbound exit and westbound entrance; western end of freeway
Duval	Jacksonville	36.572	58.857	Duval Street	Westbound exit and eastbound entrance; SR 228 west follows the fork to Adams Street.
Duval	Jacksonville	37.541	60.416	west end of state maintenance	
Duval	Jacksonville	37.57	60.46	US 1 Alt. north (Martin Luther King Jr. Parkway / SR 115A) to I-95 – Sports Complex	Western end of US 1 Alt. concurrency; westbound exit and eastbound entrance
Duval	Jacksonville	37.857– 38.593	60.925– 62.109	Hart Bridge over St. Johns River	
Duval	Jacksonville	38.84	62.51	SR 10 (Atlantic Boulevard / US 90 Alt.) / Art Museum Drive	Interchange
Duval	Jacksonville	39.43	63.46	US 1 Alt. south (Emerson Street / SR 228A) to I-95 / US 90 west (Beach Boulevard)	Eastern end of US 1 Alt. concurrency; eastbound exit and westbound entrance
Duval	Jacksonville	40.16	64.63	SR 109 (University Boulevard)	Interchange
Duval	Jacksonville	41.584	66.923	US 90 east (Beach Boulevard / SR 212)	Eastern terminus; eastbound exit and westbound entrance
1.000 mi = 1.609 km; 1.000 km = 0.621 mi: Concurrency terminus; Incomplete access; Route transition
