= Franklin D. Fraser =

American judge

Franklin D. Fraser (April 23, 1819 – November 10, 1879) was a lawyer and a Republican politician who served on the Florida Supreme Court from 1873 to 1874. He was from Pennsylvania and joined his brother in Florida after the American Civil War. Republican governor Ossian B. Hart appointed him to the Florida Supreme Court. He resigned 16 months later following Hart's death.

== Biography ==
Fraser was born in Montrose, Pennsylvania in Susquehanna County on April 23, 1819. His father was Dr. Charles Fraser and his mother was Mary. He attended schools at Montrose and at Oxford, New York and attended Union College at Schenectady, New York. He returned to Montrose to read law with Judge William Jessup, Sr. He was admitted to the Bar in 1842 and worked in Susquehanna and Wyoming counties. He married Jane B. Clark. They had one daughter, Fannie. He had a reputation for careful, thoughtful preparation, great ability, and for tenacity once he'd reached a decision. He served as a Prosecuting Attorney in Pennsylvania.

His older brother Philip, who had a law practice in Jacksonville, Florida and who had served as mayor, was an ally of Isaiah and Ossian Bingley Hart. Philip had fled to Montrose after the Unionists evacuated Jacksonville in 1862. When he returned as Federal judge for Northern District of Florida, Franklin Fraser came to work briefly as the district's deputy clerk before returning to Pennsylvania. In 1869, he returned to Florida as the Northern District's register in bankruptcy.

When Hart became governor in 1872, he needed someone he could trust to fill his position on the bench. He appointed Fraser to the Court January 16, 1873. After Hart died in March 1874, Fraser resigned from the court that May, expressing dissatisfaction with his salary and with Southern society. He had served 16 months on the court, having written opinions in seven minor cases. He returned to his law practice in Pennsylvania. He died of pneumonia on November 10, 1879.
