= Florida State Road 109 =

State highway in Florida, United States

State Road 109
- University Boulevard
- SR 109 in red, SR 109A in blue

Route information
- Maintained by FDOT
- Length: 8.707 mi (14.013 km)

Major junctions
- West end: SR 13 in Jacksonville
- US 1 in Jacksonville; I-95 in Jacksonville; US 90 in Jacksonville
- East end: Jacksonville University

Location
- Country: United States
- State: Florida

Highway system
- Florida State Highway System; Interstate; US; State; Former; Pre‑1945; Toll; Scenic
← SR 105	→ I-110

State Road 109 (SR 109) is a 8.707-mile-long (14.013 km) state road in Jacksonville, Florida. It is an east–west road that starts at SR 13 and ends at Jacksonville University. SR 109 is known as University Boulevard because the route forms the eastern border of Jacksonville University's campus.

== Route description ==
University Boulevard travels through the western part of Jacksonville's Arlington neighborhood. Mostly lined with businesses, it is a major thoroughfare throughout its course. SR 109 (University Boulevard)'s southern terminus is at an intersection with SR 13 (San Jose Boulevard), one block from the St. Johns River. It heads due east for over 1 mile (1.6 km) until reaching St. Augustine Road and turning to the northeast. It then passes over a CSX rail line before meeting U.S. Route 1 (US 1; Philips Highway) and traveling under Interstate 95 (I-95). The highway continues on a more northerly course as it reaches US 90 (Beach Boulevard) and SR 228 (Commodore Point Expressway) before an intersection with SR 10 (Atlantic Boulevard), and turns briefly to the west as it splits with SR 109A (Cesery Boulevard), crossing the Arlington River. After a major interchange with SR 115 (Arlington Expressway), it continues north to Jacksonville University. Although the SR 109 designation ends at Jacksonville University, University Boulevard continues north for more than 2 miles (3.2 km) with its northern terminus, like its southern, just feet from the St. Johns River.

== History ==
Prior to the development of Jacksonville University, from which the road gets its current name, it was called Love Grove Road, hence Lovegrove Elementary School, on the same road. It was then very different from its current urban character. In earlier names it was rural, with farms and open spaces. From 2002 to 2005, the City of Jacksonville fought with neighborhood residents and businesses over two proposed intersection flyover projects included in the Better Jacksonville Plan. One proposed project was at SR 109's intersection with Atlantic Blvd/SR 10, while the other was at its intersection with Beach Blvd/US 90. Residents and businesses feared their properties would be consumed due to the space needed for construction, and that the city would cite eminent domain in order to do so. Other residents were concerned that the flyovers would detract from the beauty of the neighborhoods. In 2006, the City of Jacksonville considered alternative solutions to improving traffic congestion at these intersections, including various at-grade improvements: road widening, additional turn lanes, and other related options. Both plans were scrapped in September 2007.

== Major intersections ==
The entire route is in Jacksonville, Duval County.

mi	km	Destinations	Notes
0.000	0.000	SR 13 (San Jose Boulevard)	Southern terminus
1.736	2.794	US 1 (Philips Highway / SR 5)	
1.993	3.207	To Richard Street south / I-95 – St. Augustine	
2.18	3.51	I-95 north (SR 9)	I-95 exit 346
2.253	3.626	Spring Park Road to Bowden Road	
4.005	6.445	US 90 (Beach Boulevard / SR 212)	
4.308	6.933	To US 90 east (Beach Boulevard) / Atlantic Boulevard (SR 10) / Hart Bridge (SR 228) – Downtown Jacksonville	Interchange
5.493	8.840	SR 10 / US 90 Alt. (Atlantic Boulevard)	
5.955	9.584	University Boulevard	Northbound exit and southbound entrance; former SR 109 north
6.441	10.366	SR 115 (Arlington Expressway / SR 10A) to SR 109 north	Interchange
Gap in route
0.000	0.000	SR 115 (SR 10A) / University Boulevard south – Downtown Jacksonville, Beaches, Hart Bridge	Interchange
2.266	3.647	North end of state maintenance	
1.000 mi = 1.609 km; 1.000 km = 0.621 mi

== State Road 109A ==
State Road 109A
- Location: Jacksonville

State Road 109A (SR 109A), also known as Cesery Boulevard, travels nearly exactly the same course a few blocks to the east of SR 109. Its southern terminus is at an intersection with SR 109 just south of the Arlington River crossing. Then, it travels north, intersecting SR 115 (Arlington Expressway) before becoming a two-lane street to its northern terminus at Ft. Caroline Road.

In 1960s, Cesery Boulevard was widened as part of a road program associated with the development of Arlington Expressway and the Mathews Bridge. Interchanges were constructed to Cesery Boulevard to reduce traffic congestion and accidents.

The entire route is in Jacksonville, Duval County.

mi	km	Destinations	Notes
		SR 109 (University Boulevard)	Southern terminus
		SR 10 (Atlantic Boulevard)	
		Ft. Caroline Road	Northern terminus
1.000 mi = 1.609 km; 1.000 km = 0.621 mi
