= William Bradwell =

Florida politician (1822–1887)

William Bradwell (December 1822 – July 16, 1887) was an American politician and religious leader of the Reconstruction era.

A resident of Jacksonville, Florida, he represented Duval County in the Florida House of Representatives from 1868 to 1870. An African American, he was a leader in the A.M.E. Church. He served in the Florida Senate representing Duval County, Florida from 1868 to 1870. He was a Republican and stated that his father was "one of the first representatives to the Legislature of Georgia".

Following the Reconstruction acts passed in the U.S. Congress, he was involved in organizing black voters and supported a ticket with Republican Ossian B. Hart.

== See also ==
- List of African-American officeholders during Reconstruction
