= Martin Luther King Jr. Parkway (Jacksonville) =

U.S. Highway 1
- Martin Luther King Jr. Parkway

Route information
- Maintained by FDOT
- Length: 6.749 mi (10.861 km)
- Component highways: US 1 / US 1 Alt.

Major junctions
- South end: SR 115 in Downtown Jacksonville
- North end: US 1 / US 23 in Grand Park

Location
- Country: United States
- State: Florida

Highway system
- United States Numbered Highway System; List; Special; Divided; Florida State Highway System; Interstate; US; State; Former; Pre‑1945; Toll; Scenic

The Martin Luther King Jr. Parkway is a 7.1-mile (11.4 km) long expressway running along the eastern and northern edges of Downtown Jacksonville, Florida. It carries U.S. Route 1 Alternate (US 1 Alternate) from near its southern terminus to an interchange with US 1/US 17 (Main Street). US 1 follows the expressway to its northern terminus, an intersection with US 23. Despite its name, it is not a parkway in the conventional sense, as it has no limits on truck use and is not located near parks or other beautified areas.

== Route description ==
The parkway begins just east of the Gator Bowl, near an interchange with State Route 10A (SR 10A) and SR 139 to the Mathews Bridge. Continuing north around downtown Jacksonville, the highway bends due west and intersects Interstate 95 (I-95). The route continues west for another mile before merging with US 23 (New Kings Road).

The entire length of the parkway is included as part of the National Highway System, a system of roadways important to the nation's economy, defense, and mobility.

== History ==
Upon its completion in the early 1960s, the road was actually known by two names. The eastern portion, running due north from the base of the Matthews Bridge, was known as the Haines Street Expressway. The northern portion, running due west from the northern terminus of the Haines Expressway, was known as the 20th Street Expressway. Both sections took their respective names from the actual city streets that they either replaced or ran parallel to. The two roads were, in actual operation, a single road, providing a rapid, limited-access route from the Gator Bowl in the southeastern corner of downtown Jacksonville, to the northwestern residential reaches of downtown.

In 2000, the Jacksonville City Council voted to honor the murdered civil rights movement leader Martin Luther King Jr., by naming this route after him, and the change was effected on January 15, 2001, the 72nd anniversary of King's birth. Jacksonville was one of the last major cities in the country to rename a road for Dr. King; by choosing this route, the city was able to pay homage and yet because the entire route is without any addresses, either residential or business, the council was able to avoid irritating constituents, as often happens with such name changes. For the same reason, the frontage roads are still named Haines Street.

== Exit list ==
The entire route is in Jacksonville, Duval County.

mi	km	Destinations	Notes
0.000	0.000	Church Street East / Haines Street - Sports Complex	Intersection; south end of state maintenance
0.11	0.18	SR 115 south (Mathews Bridge / SR 10A east) to I-95 (via SR 10A west / SR 139 north) – Arlington, Jax Beaches, Downtown Jacksonville	North end of SR 115A; south end of SR 115 overlap
0.34	0.55	US 1 Alt. south (Hart Bridge / SR 115A) to US 90 east / I-95 – Southside, Jax Beaches	South end of US 1 Alt. overlap; southbound exit and northbound entrance
0.56	0.90	Haines Street / Jessie Street	
1.2	1.9	Haines Street	Northbound exit and southbound entrance
1.3	2.1	8th Street - Jaxport Talleyrand Terminal	
2.1	3.4	21st Street/Phoenix Avenue	
2.80	4.51	Liberty Street	
3.08	4.96	US 1 south / US 1 Alt. ends / US 17 (Main Street / SR 5)	North end of US 1 Alt. overlap; south end of US 1 overlap
3.35	5.39	Pearl Street	Northbound exit and southbound entrance
3.52	5.66	Boulevard	
3.96	6.37	I-95 (SR 9 / SR 15 south / SR 115 north) – International Airport	North end of freeway; north end of SR 115 overlap; south end of SR 15 overlap; I-95 exit 354
4.231	6.809	Moncrief Road	Intersection (traffic signal)
4.401	7.083	Myrtle Avenue	Intersection (traffic signal)
4.713	7.585	Wilson Street	Intersection (right turn only onto MLK Parkway)
5.044	8.118	Fairfax Street	Intersection (traffic signal)
5.686	9.151	Canal Street	Intersection (traffic signal)
5.947	9.571	Division Street	Intersection (traffic signal)
6.679	10.749	Service Road / 25th Street	Intersection (ramp to MLK Parkway eastbound wraps around under New Kings Road)
6.749	10.861	US 1 north / US 23 north (New Kings Road / SR 15) – Amtrak	Interchange
1.000 mi = 1.609 km; 1.000 km = 0.621 mi: Closed/former; Concurrency terminus; Incomplete access; Unopened

== See also ==
- Transportation in Jacksonville, Florida
