= Florida State Road 10 =

State highway in Florida, United States

State Road 10
- Signed portion in red, unsigned portions in grey through expanded map

Route information
- Maintained by FDOT
- Length: 394.524 mi (634.925 km) 15.087 miles (24.280 km) signed
- Existed: 1945 renumbering (definition)–present

Major junctions
- West end: US 90 near Ensley
- I-95 / US 1 in Jacksonville; I-295 in Jacksonville
- East end: SR A1A in Neptune Beach

Location
- Country: United States
- State: Florida
- Counties: Escambia, Santa Rosa, Okaloosa, Walton, Holmes, Washington, Jackson, Gadsden, Leon, Jefferson, Madison, Suwannee, Columbia, Baker, Nassau, Duval

Highway system
- Florida State Highway System; Interstate; US; State; Former; Pre‑1945; Toll; Scenic
← I-10	→ SR 10A

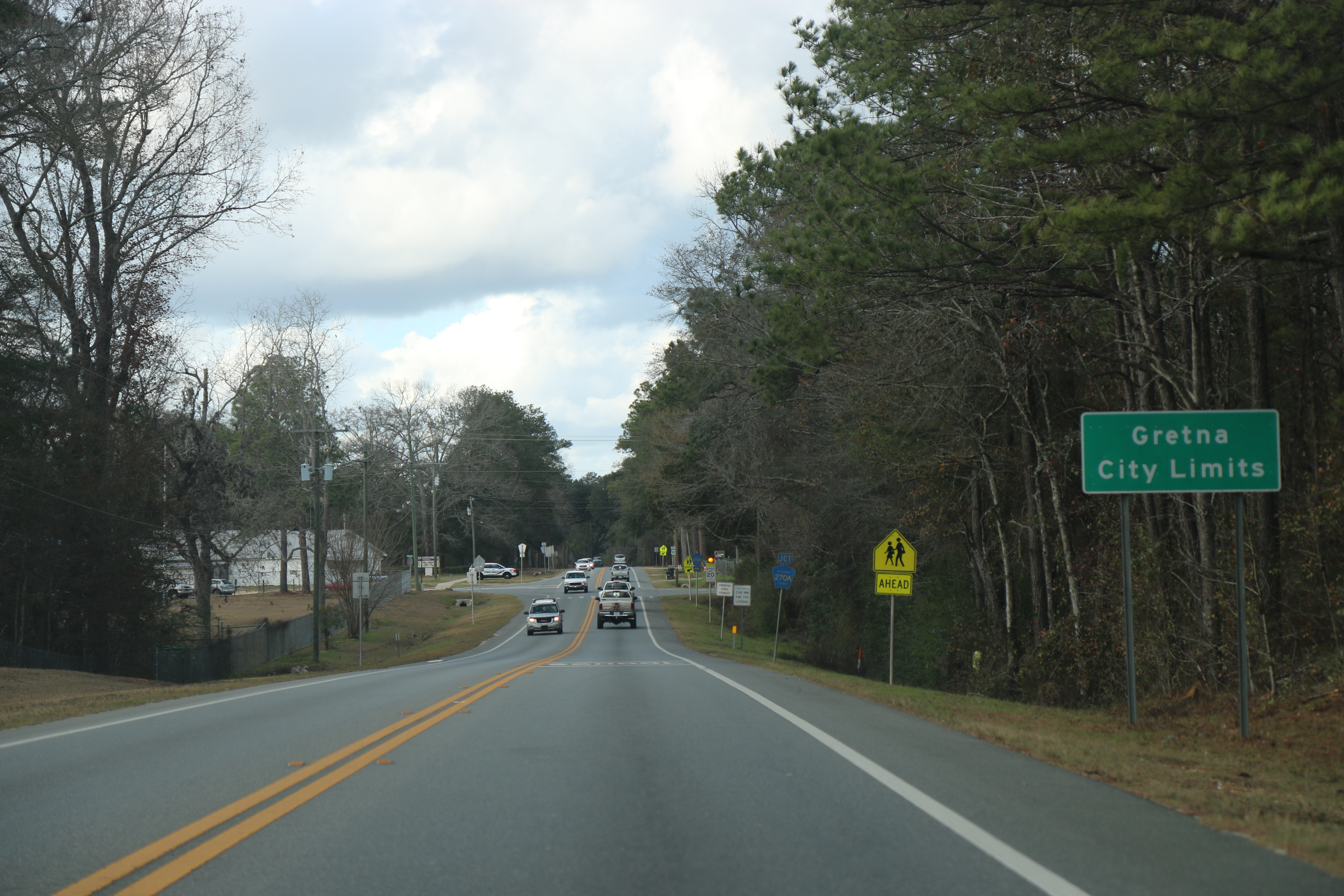
Gretna FL sign US90

State Road 10 (SR 10), also known as Atlantic Boulevard, is a major east–west state highway in the U.S. state of Florida. Mostly unsigned in favor of U.S. Highway 90, it runs from the Alabama state line (Perdido River) to Atlantic Beach. The only sections that are not signed as US 90 are north of Pensacola, where US 90 uses SR 10A and SR 10 is signed as U.S. Highway 90 Alternate, and east of south Jacksonville, where US 90 uses unsigned SR 212.

== Route description ==
The only signed section of SR 10 is in Jacksonville and Atlantic Beach. Signage begins at the interchange with Interstate 95 and U.S. Highway 1, where US 1 splits to the south. There is a signed concurrency east to the split with US 90. Where US 90 and SR 10 split, SR 10 is known as Atlantic Boulevard, while US 90 is known as Beach Boulevard (unsigned State Road 212) to Jacksonville Beach.

About a mile (2 km) before the east end of SR 10, at the east end of the bridge over the Intracoastal Waterway, SR A1A (Mayport Road) joins from the north. There is an incorrect overhead sign that says the Mayport Road flyover ramp is SR 101, however the SR 101 designation does not begin on Mayport Road for another 2.3 miles (3.6 km). At the exit, Mayport Road is SR A1A. The two roads run concurrently on Atlantic Boulevard to Third Street, where SR 10 ends and SR A1A turns south. (Atlantic Boulevard continues several blocks further as a local road to the beach.)

== Major intersections ==
County	Location	mi	km	Destinations	Notes
Escambia		0.000	0.000	US 90 west (SR-16) – Mobile	Alabama state line (Perdido River bridge)
Escambia	Beulah	2.485	3.999	US 90 east (SR 10A) – Pensacola	east end of US 90 overlap; west end of US 90 Alt. overlap; no left turn westbound
Escambia	see US 90 Alt. (mile 0.000-13.024)				
Escambia	Riverview	15.509	24.959	US 90 west (Scenic Highway / SR 10A) – Airport	east end of US 90 Alt. overlap; west end of US 90 overlap
see US 90 (mile 29.242-392.021)
Duval	Jacksonville	378.3	608.8	US 1 south / US 90 east (Prudential Drive / SR 5 south / SR 13) to I-95 north	interchange; east end of US 1 / US 90 / SR 5 overlap; access to Baptist Medical Center and Wolfson Children's Hospital
Duval	Jacksonville	378.4	609.0	To I-95 / Acosta Bridge (SR 13 north) / Riverside Avenue / Mary Street	interchange; westbound exit and eastbound entrance
Duval	Jacksonville	378.5	609.1	I-95 north (SR 9) to I-10 west	I-95 exit 349; westbound exit and eastbound entrance; west end of westbound-only overlap with I-95 north / SR 9 north
Duval	Jacksonville	378.7	609.5	SR 13 (Hendricks Avenue)	interchange; eastbound exit only
Duval	Jacksonville	379.2	610.3	I-95 south (SR 9) / US 1 south (Philips Highway / SR 5)	I-95 exit 350A; eastbound exit and westbound entrance; east end of westbound-only overlap with I-95 north / SR 9 north
Duval	Jacksonville	379.33	610.47	US 90 west (Atlantic Boulevard)	interchange; westbound exit and eastbound entrance; west end of US 90 overlap
Duval	Jacksonville	379.948	611.467	To I-95 / Spring Park Road	eastbound access only
Duval	Jacksonville	379.980	611.519	US 90 east (Beach Boulevard / SR 212)	interchange; eastbound exit and westbound entrance; east end of US 90 overlap; west end of US 90 Alt. overlap
Duval	Jacksonville	380.99	613.14	To US 90 east (Beach Boulevard) / Hart Bridge (US 1 Alt. / SR 228) – Downtown Jacksonville, Sports Complex	interchange
Duval	Jacksonville	382.227	615.135	SR 109 (University Boulevard) – Jacksonville University	
Duval	Jacksonville	384.715	619.139	US 90 Alt. east / SR 115 (Southside Boulevard) to SR 113 north	east end of US 90 Alt. overlap
Duval	Jacksonville	385.313	620.101	SR 115 north (Arlington Expressway / SR 10A west) – Downtown Jacksonville	
Duval	Jacksonville	386.69	622.32	I-295 (SR 9A)	I-295 exit 48
Duval	Jacksonville	389.01	626.05	Kernan Boulevard	interchange
Duval	Jacksonville	391.376	629.859	San Pablo Road (CR 101A south)	
Duval		391.878– 392.436	630.667– 631.565	Atlantic Boulevard Bridge over San Pablo River (Atlantic Intracoastal Waterway)	
Duval	Neptune Beach–Atlantic Beach line	393.25	632.87	SR A1A north (Mayport Road) to SR 101 north / Florida Boulevard – Mayport, Naval Station Mayport	interchange; west end of SR A1A overlap
Duval	Neptune Beach–Atlantic Beach line	394.524	634.925	SR A1A south (3rd Street) – Jacksonville Beach, Daytona Beach	east end of SR A1A overlap
1.000 mi = 1.609 km; 1.000 km = 0.621 mi: Concurrency terminus

== Related routes ==
=== State Road 10A (Jacksonville) ===
State Road 10A
- Location: Jacksonville

State Road 10A (SR 10A), known locally as the Arlington Expressway, is an alternate route of SR 10 (Atlantic Boulevard) in Jacksonville. Most of the expressway runs concurrent with SR 115.

SR 10A runs east from Downtown Jacksonville over the Mathews Bridge to Atlantic Boulevard (SR 10) at the Regency Square Mall.

=== State Road 10A (Lake City) ===
State Road 10A
- Location: Lake City

State Road 10A (SR 10A) is an alternate route of SR 10 (US 90) in Lake City. It runs along Baya Avenue to the south of SR 10.

=== State Road 10A (Pensacola) ===
State Road 10A
- Location: Pensacola

State Road 10A (SR 10A) is an alternate route of SR 10 (US 90 Alt.) in Pensacola. It is the unsigned designation for US 90 running through downtown Pensacola, while US 90 Alt./SR 10 bypasses the city.

=== State Road 10F ===
State Road 10F
- Location: Jacksonville

State Road 10F (SR 10F) is a southbound only frontage road for SR 10 (US 1/US 90) in Downtown Jacksonville known locally as South Main Street. The northbound frontage road is signed as SR 5. SR 10F runs from the southern end of the John T. Alsop, Jr. Bridge to the entrance to I-95 south.

=== State Road 1010 ===
State Road 1010
- Location: Atlantic Beach

State Road 1010 is a service road in Atlantic Beach accessible only from westbound running SR 10 on Atlantic Boulevard. The road runs north of SR 10 towards the Intracoastal Waterway along a former alignment of SR 10.

Browse numbered routes
← SR 998	SR 1010	→ SR 1051
