= Ossian B. Hart =

American judge and politician (1821–1874)

Ossian Bingley Hart
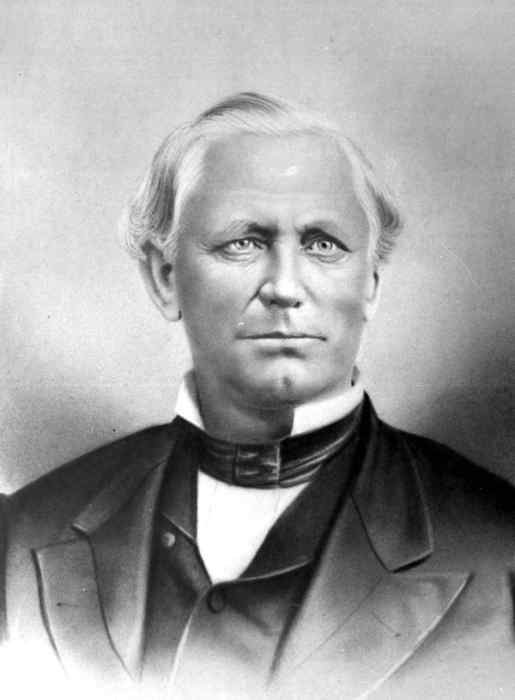

10th Governor of Florida
- In office January 7, 1873 – March 18, 1874
- Lieutenant: Marcellus Stearns
- Preceded by: Harrison Reed
- Succeeded by: Marcellus Stearns

Justice of the Supreme Court of Florida
- In office 1868–1873
- Preceded by: Inaugural
- Succeeded by: Franklin D. Fraser

Member of the Florida House of Representatives
- In office 1845

Personal details
- Born: January 17, 1821 Jacksonville, Florida, U.S.
- Died: March 18, 1874 (aged 53) Jacksonville, Florida, U.S.
- Party: Republican
- Spouse: Catherine Smith Campbell (m. 1843)
- Parent: Isaiah Hart

Ossian Bingley Hart (January 17, 1821 – March 18, 1874) was the 10th governor of Florida from 1873 to 1874, and the first governor of Florida who was born in the state.

== Early life and career ==
Hart was born in Jacksonville to Isaiah Hart, one of the city's founders, and Nancy Nelson. He was raised on his father's plantation along the St. Johns River. He was a lawyer in Jacksonville. He moved to a farm near Fort Pierce, Florida, in 1843, and was a founding member of the St. Lucie County Board of Commissioners. In 1845, Hart became Florida State Representative for St. Lucie County. In 1846 he moved to Key West where he resumed his law practice. In 1856, he moved to Tampa, Florida. Among his clients was "Adam", a black man who was lynched after the Florida Supreme Court declared his murder conviction a mistrial.

Despite his upbringing, Hart became a Republican and openly opposed secession from the United States, causing some difficult times for him during the American Civil War. Following the war, he helped reestablish the governments of the state and of the city of Jacksonville. In 1868, he was appointed a justice of the Florida Supreme Court. In 1870, he ran unsuccessfully for U.S. Congress, only to be elected governor two years later on November 5, 1872. He appointed Jonathan Clarkson Gibbs as Florida's first African-American Superintendent of Public Instruction. During his tenure, "limited civil rights legislation was passed, and some improvements were made in the state's weakened finances." Weakened by the campaign, he fell ill with pneumonia and died in Jacksonville. He was succeeded by lieutenant governor Marcellus Stearns, Florida's last Republican governor until 1967.

== Personal life ==
He married Catherine Smith Campbell, a resident of Newark, New Jersey, on October 3, 1843.

Party political offices
Preceded by Harrison Reed	Republican nominee for Governor of Florida; 1872	Succeeded by Marcellus Stearns
Political offices
Preceded by Harrison Reed	Governor of Florida; January 7, 1873 to March 18, 1874	Succeeded by Marcellus Stearns
