= U.S. Route 23 in Florida =

Highway in Florida

U.S. Highway 23
- US 23 highlighted in red

Route information
- Maintained by FDOT
- Length: 37.656 mi (60.601 km)
- Existed: 1950–present

Major junctions
- South end: US 1 / US 17 / SR 228 in Jacksonville
- I-95 / US 17 / SR 228 in Jacksonville; US 301 in Callahan
- North end: US 1 / US 23 / US 301 / SR 4 / SR 15 towards Folkston, GA

Location
- Country: United States
- State: Florida
- Counties: Duval, Nassau

Highway system
- United States Numbered Highway System; List; Special; Divided; Florida State Highway System; Interstate; US; State; Former; Pre‑1945; Toll; Scenic
← SR 22	→ SR 23
← SR 136	SR 139	→ SR 143

U.S. Highway 23 (US 23) is a United States Numbered Highway that runs from Jacksonville, Florida, to Mackinaw City, Michigan. In the U.S. state of Florida, US 23 is concurrent with US 1 south of Alma, Georgia, except in Downtown Jacksonville. US 23 is also concurrent with US 301 between Homeland, Georgia, and Callahan. In the Jacksonville area, US 23 is the unsigned State Road 139 (SR 139), which also continues east from the south end of US 23 along SR 10A to SR 115 near the Mathews Bridge.

== Route description ==
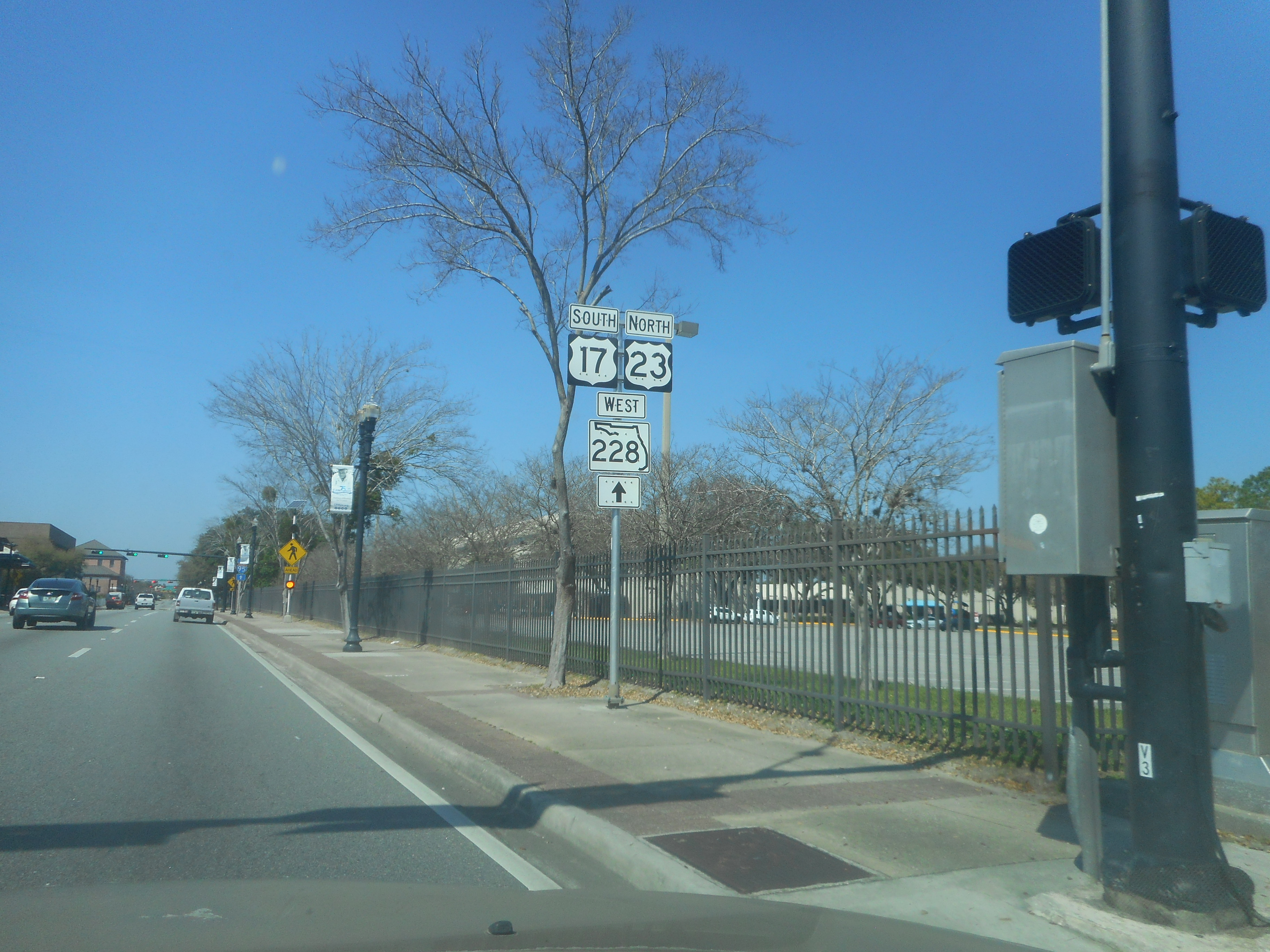
Sign for the US 17/US 23/SR 228 overlap west of Laura Street in Jacksonville.

US 23 begins at US 1 (Main Street) at the northern end of Downtown Jacksonville, starting as a one-way pair, with the northbound lanes meeting with Florida State College at Jacksonville. It is also unsigned SR 139 from its southern terminus to its interchange with US 1 in northwestern Jacksonville (SR 139 continues east along SR 10A from the end of US 23 to SR 115). Additionally, it has a wrong-way concurrency with US 17 from the beginning at US 1 to exits 363B and 363C on Interstate 95 (I-95). West of I-95, US 23 ends the one-way pair, continuing as Kings Road through northwestern Jacksonville, as an off-grid road. A few miles to the northwest in the Grand Park section of Jacksonville, US 23 runs beneath a railroad bridge originally owned by the St. Johns River Terminal Company (now the Norfolk Southern Springfield Lead) before it meets with US 1/SR 15 (Martin Luther King Jr. Parkway), running concurrently with the highway through the rest of its journey through Florida. The road continues northwest, intersecting with I-295, and eventually makes its way out of Jacksonville. At Callahan, US 1/US 23 meets US 301, beginning a three-way concurrency as the road continues northward through Hilliard and Boulogne toward the St. Marys River, leaving Florida and entering Georgia.

== History ==
Beginning in 1950, US 23's southern terminus was extended into Florida approximately 319 miles (513 km) south from Atlanta, Georgia, to Jacksonville.

A US 23 shield used in Florida prior to 1993

From 1956 until 1993, US 23 signs in Florida featured white numbering on a green shield. The "color-coding" of U.S. Highways by the Florida Department of Transportation was stopped when the state could no longer use federal funds to replace the signs with anything but the standard black-and-white version. Some green US 23 signs may still remain.

During the early-to-mid-1960's, it was planned to extend south, possibly to Fort Myers via US 17, SR 19, SR 33, US 98, and SR 31. Later, the proposed southern terminus was scaled back to Lake Alfred at US 17/92 near Winter Haven. The route was to include US 17, SR 19, SR 33, SR 559, and what are today CR 557A and CR 557. Both proposals were denied by the American Association of State Highway Officials.

== Major intersections ==
County	Location	mi	km	Destinations	Notes
For the rest of SR 139, see SR 10A (mile 1.24-0.000)
Duval	Jacksonville	0.000	0.000	US 1 / US 17 north / SR 228 east (North Main Street / SR 5); East Union Street (SR 10A east / SR 139 south)	National southern terminus
Duval	Jacksonville	0.093	0.150	US 90 Alt. west (North Laura Street)	
Duval	Jacksonville	0.688	1.107	To I-95 / US 90 (Beaver Street) / North Davis Street	
Duval	Jacksonville	0.84	1.35	I-95 / US 17 south / SR 228 west (SR 9) to I-10 west	I-95 exits 353B-C; north end of US 17 / SR 228 overlap; no direct access from US 23 south to I-95 north (turn around at North Davis Street)
Duval	Jacksonville	3.820	6.148	US 1 south (M.L. King Jr. Parkway / SR 15) to I-95	Interchange; no southbound entrance; north end of SR 139 overlap; south end of US 1 / SR 15 overlap
See US 1 (mile 511.20-545.03)
Nassau	Boulogne	37.656	60.601	US 1 north / US 23 north / US 301 north / SR 4 north / SR 15 north – Folkston, Nahunta, Waycross	Georgia state line (St. Marys River bridge). Continuation into Georgia
1.000 mi = 1.609 km; 1.000 km = 0.621 mi: Concurrency terminus

== See also ==
U.S. Route 23
Previous state: Terminus	Florida	Next state: Georgia
