= Isaiah Hart =

Founder of Jacksonville, Florida

Isaiah David Hart
- Born: November 6, 1792; Burke County, Georgia, US
- Died: September 4, 1861 (aged 68); Jacksonville, Florida, US
- Occupation: Founder of Jacksonville, Florida
- Spouse: Nancy Nelson Hart
- Children: Ossian B. Hart

Isaiah David Hart (November 6, 1792 – September 4, 1861) was an American plantation owner, and the founder of Jacksonville, Florida. Originally from Georgia, Hart took up arms against Spain in the Patriot Rebellion of 1812. After moving to a location near the cow ford on the narrows of the St. Johns River, he began platting the town in 1822, and later served as postmaster, court clerk, commissioner of pilotage, judge of elections, major in the local militia during the Seminole War, and as a Whig member of the Florida Territorial Senate. The Isaiah D. Hart Bridge over the St. Johns River in Jacksonville was built in 1967 and was named after him.

== Early life ==
Isaiah Hart's father, William Hart, a native of Pennsylvania, was a saddler by trade who moved south to Virginia and later settled in Burke County, Georgia, where Isaiah was born on November 6, 1792. In 1801, William Hart moved his family to East Florida when he received a land grant of 640 acres on Moncrief Creek and the Trout River from the Spanish governor. He and his sons Isaiah and Dan were citizens of Spanish Florida and served in the Spanish militia, but joined the so-called "Patriots of East Florida" during the Patriot War of East Florida, in which disaffected farmers and woodsmen, mostly from Georgia and led by rich planters, tried to seize control of East Florida from the Spanish in 1812. As a young man participating in Patriot raids, Isaiah Hart organized bands of marauders that raided Florida plantations for slaves and cattle, drove them northward into Georgia, and sold them.

Isaiah Hart married Nancy Nelson in 1818 and settled at King's Ferry where the old King's Road crossed the St. Marys River. After the United States took control of Florida, Hart observed an increase in traffic on the road as settlers came south from Georgia and the Carolinas to the Florida Territory. In 1819, William Dawson and Stephen Buckles opened a general merchandise store on the King's Road, near the cow ford at the narrows of the St. Johns River, where John Brady operated a busy ferry service. Hart realized that the location offered economic opportunities, and on May 18, 1821, he bought 18 acres on the north bank of the St. Johns from Lewis Zachariah Hogans, owner of the surrounding land, which was formerly part of the Taylor Grant, for $72 worth of cattle. Here, to the west of present-day Market Street, he built a store-cum-tavern that served as his residence, as well as a riverfront dock called Hart's Landing. Over the years Hart became prosperous enough to establish himself as a man of means.

He appears in the 1850 Jacksonville, Duval, Florida census taken 14 Oct 1850 with his wife and 7 children: Isiah D. Hart, age 57, planter, b Georgia, with wife Nancy, age 50, b South Carolina, and children: Oscar Hart, age 31, b South Carolina, a lawyer, Ossin Hart, age 29, b Georgia, a lawyer, Laura Hart, age 27, Lodiska Hart, 25, and Daniel Hart, age 20, a clerk, all born in Florida, Berry Briers, age 25, a laborer, born New York, Nancy Hart, age 18, listed as "idiotic", and Julia Hart, age 16, both born in Florida. It is written either in a history of the Hart family or of the City of Jacksonville that Laura and Julia Streets in downtown Jacksonville were named for two of Isaiah and Nancy's daughters.

== Founding of Jacksonville ==
When Duval County was incorporated in 1822, Hart saw new opportunities for development, and persuaded his neighbors John Brady and Lewis Z. Hogans to join his enterprise of platting a town. In 1822, Hart, Brady and Hogans began to lay out the plan of the town, naming it after Gen. Andrew Jackson, the provisional governor of the Florida Territory. The men gathered near the north bank of the St. Johns River and laid out a grid of eight streets. By this time, Hart was becoming prominent in the Territory; in 1824, he was appointed Deputy U.S. Marshal of East Florida, and in 1826 as the Clerk of the County Court, an office he held until 1845. He successively held public office as postmaster, commissioner of pilotage, and judge of elections in Duval County.

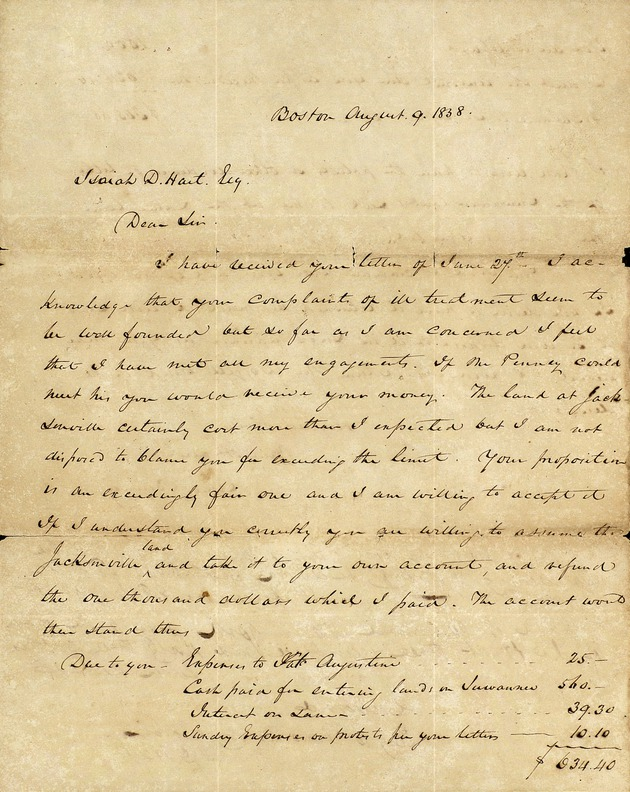
Letter to Isaiah Hart from Amos Binney, dated August 9, 1838

By 1830, Hart owned four slaves and managed his own farming and ranching operations, as well as a timber business. He continued to buy more real estate, and by the mid-1830s, had acquired 2,000 acres of land ten miles west of Jacksonville near present-day Marietta, where he established a plantation he called "Paradise". Hart's various enterprises prospered, and as his fortune increased, he invested in railroads and banks, and bought more slaves, eventually owning 57 human beings. He held various public offices and was admitted to the bar. Hart served as a major in the local militia during the Second Seminole War, and in 1839, was elected as a Whig to the Florida Territorial Senate. Although a slave owner himself, Hart supported the Union vocally and opposed secession, consequently becoming one of the founders of the Florida Whig Party. He maintained his stance on the issue while in the Territorial Senate.

In 1859, Hart extended the original plat of Jacksonville to include all of his property, and moved the town business center to higher ground on a sand ridge. Here he set aside land for a public square (now James Weldon Johnson Park), and surveyed smaller lots facing the square for the new shops and businesses that he anticipated would be built on Duval, Hogan and Monroe streets.

== Legacy ==
When he died in 1861, Isaiah Hart was one of the richest men in Florida. He owned extensive real estate in north Florida, and had substantial stockholdings in the Florida, Atlantic & Gulf Central Railroad, the Jacksonville Natural Gas Company, the Bank of St. Johns County, and a steamship line, as well as 53 African-American slaves. His son, Ossian B. Hart, was active in the Republican Party, and became the tenth governor of Florida in 1873.

After his death, he was buried in a 35-foot tall brick pyramid tower tomb in downtown Jacksonville. When the Great Fire of 1901 ravaged the city, the remains of Isaiah and wife (and possibly other family members) were moved to a family plot at Evergreen Cemetery in April 1902.
