= Hart Bridge =

Bridge in Jacksonville, Florida, US

Isaiah D. Hart Bridge
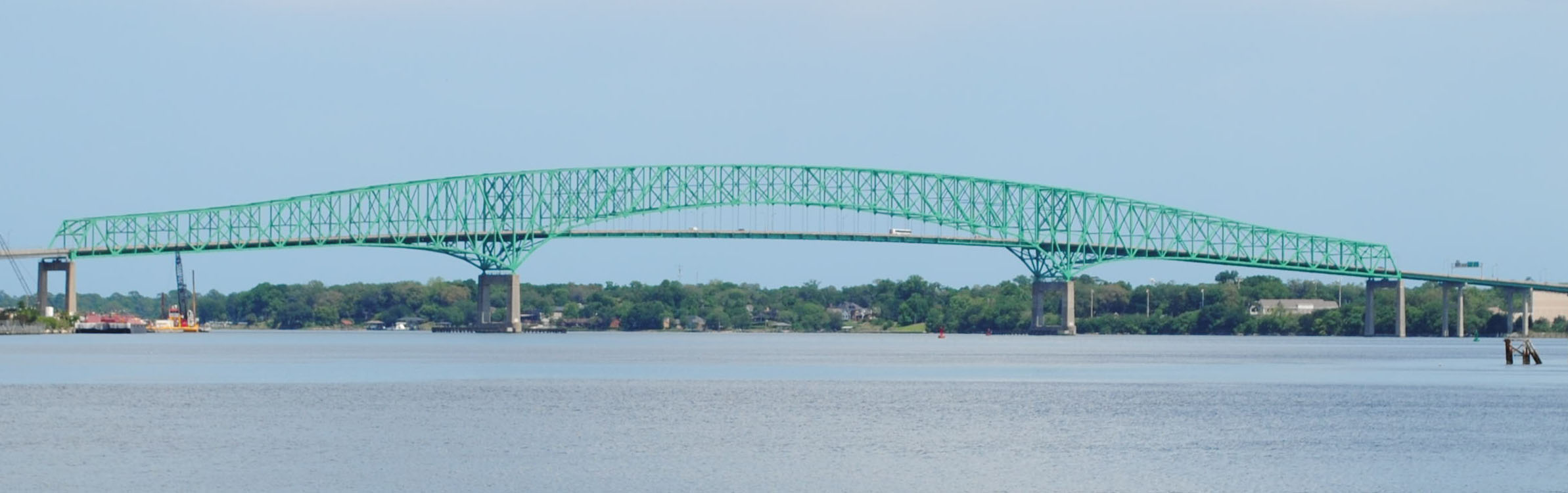
- The Hart Bridge from the south bank
- Coordinates: 30.315°N 81.6266°W
- Carries: US 1 Alt. / SR 228 (four general purpose lanes)
- Crosses: St. Johns River
- Locale: Jacksonville, Florida
- Official name: Isaiah David Hart Bridge
- Maintained by: Florida Department of Transportation
- ID number: 720107

Characteristics
- Design: Continuous truss bridge
- Total length: 1,171.7 metres (3,844 ft)
- Width: 19.7 metres (65 ft)
- Longest span: 331.6 metres (1,088 ft)
- Clearance above: 6.14 metres (20.1 ft)
- Clearance below: 42.9 metres (141 ft)

History
- Opened: November 2, 1967

Location
- Interactive map of Isaiah D. Hart Bridge

The Isaiah David Hart Bridge is a truss bridge that spans the St. Johns River in Jacksonville, Florida. It carries U.S. Route 1 Alternate (US 1 Alt.) and State Road 228 (SR 228). It is named after Isaiah Hart, the founder of Jacksonville and is often referred to as the Hart Bridge. It was designed by Sverdrup & Parcel. The Hart Bridge is one of the longest truss bridges in the world, and has the world's third longest main span of any truss bridge.

== History ==
The Isaiah David Hart Bridge was completed in 1967 at a cost of $8.83 million. The official name of the bridge is the Isaiah David Hart Bridge after the founder of Jacksonville, Isaiah Hart. The bridge was built on a bond to be paid off with tolls until they were lifted in 1989. The bridge helped relieve congestion from the Mathews Bridge and the Main Street Bridge. In 1999 the Hart Bridge was ranked 19th as one of the longest cantilever bridges in the world.

== Details ==
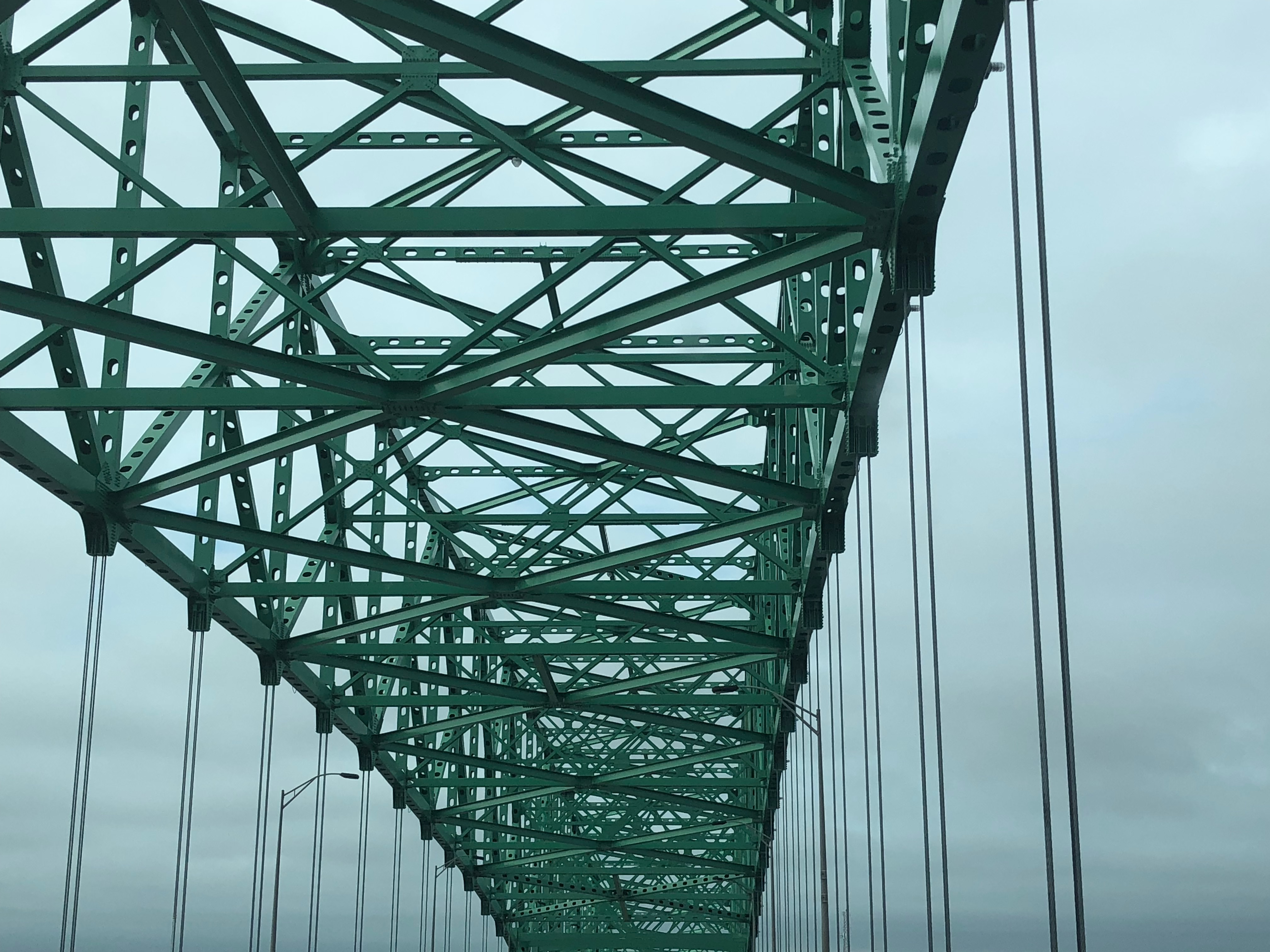
Interior view of the Hart Bridge.

The bridge has traditionally been painted green and is often referred to as "The Green Monster" by locals. Daily traffic averages 52,000 vehicles. The stretch of highway between downtown and Beach Boulevard is known as the Commodore Point Expressway, but more commonly referred to by locals as the Hart Bridge Expressway.

The bridge is a steel cantilever bridge which is a type of continuous truss bridge. The bridge's main span is uncommon for a cantilever bridge in that the truss over the main channel tapers upward and the roadway below is suspended from the truss by steel hangers.

== Gallery ==
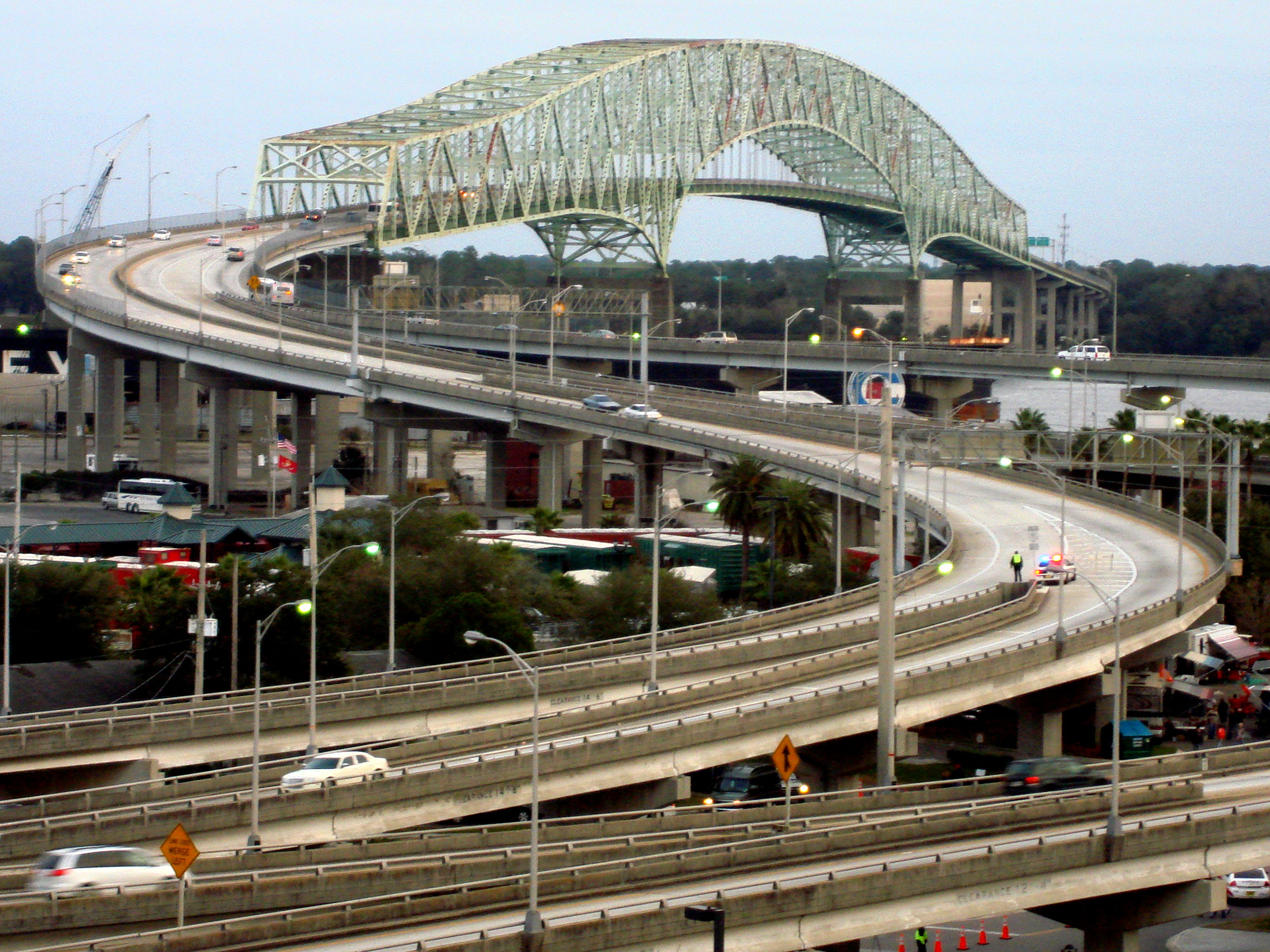
Hart Bridge view from TIAA Bank Field.

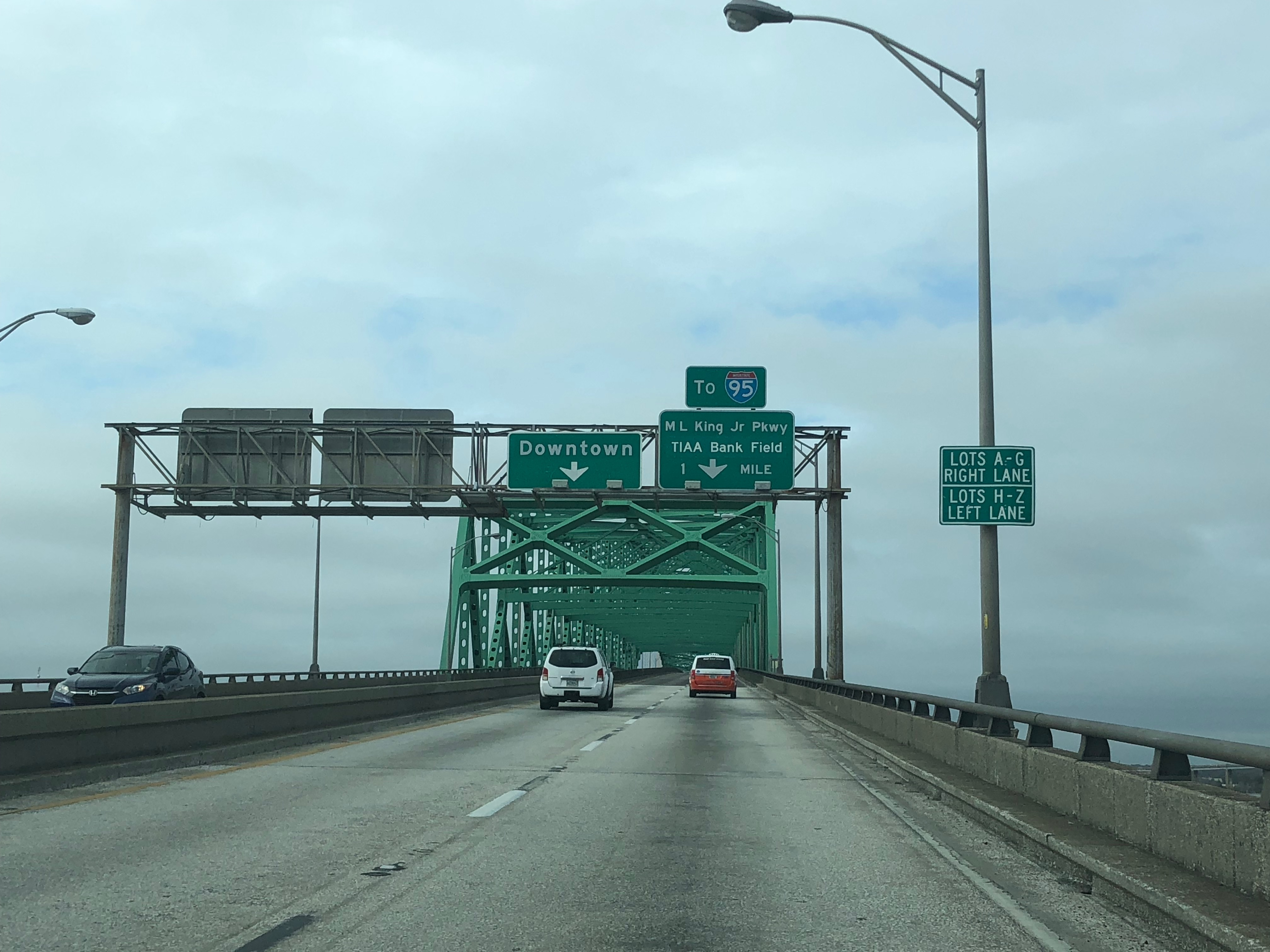
Driving on the Hart Bridge in 2019.

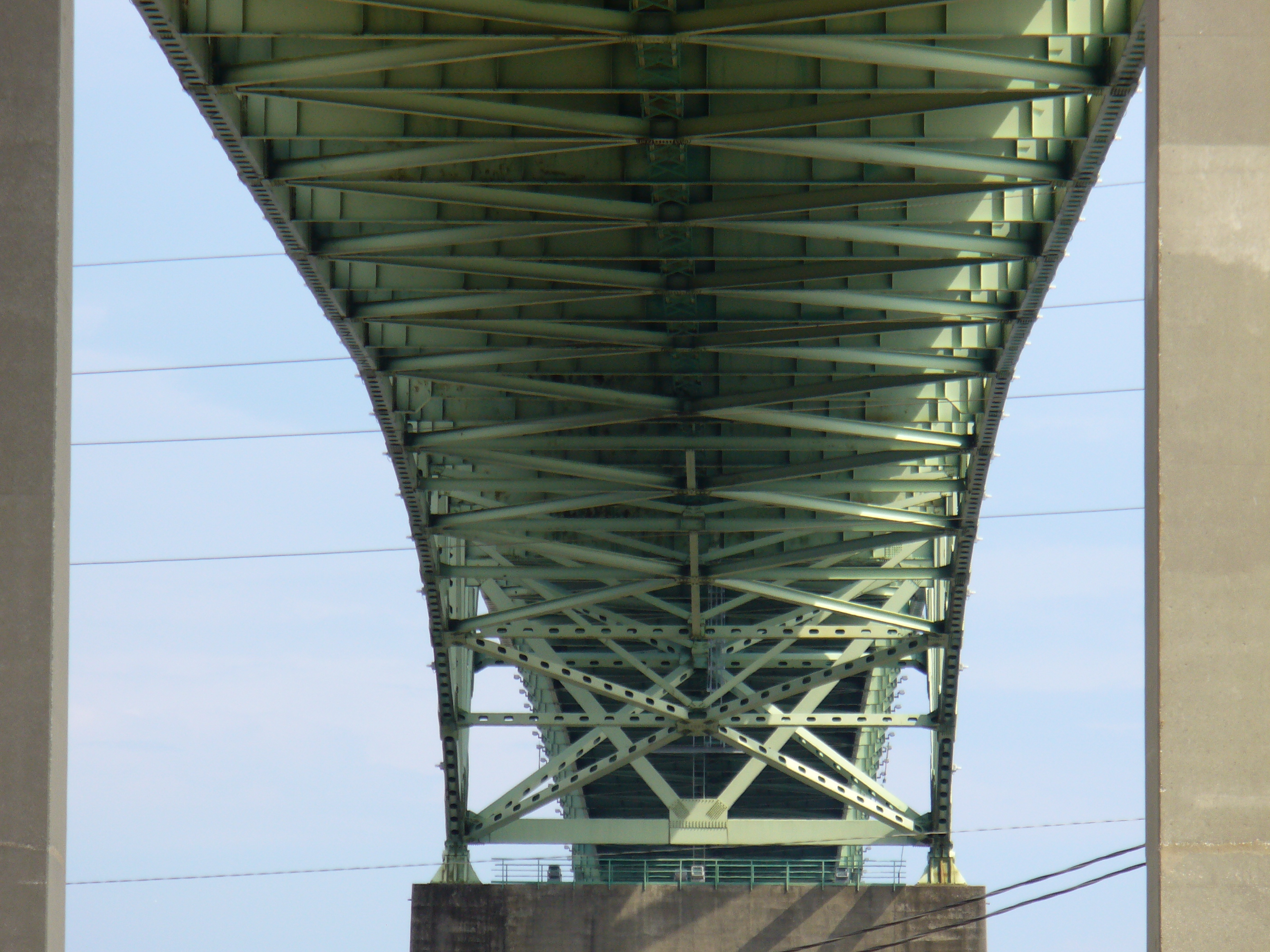
Underneath the Hart Bridge.

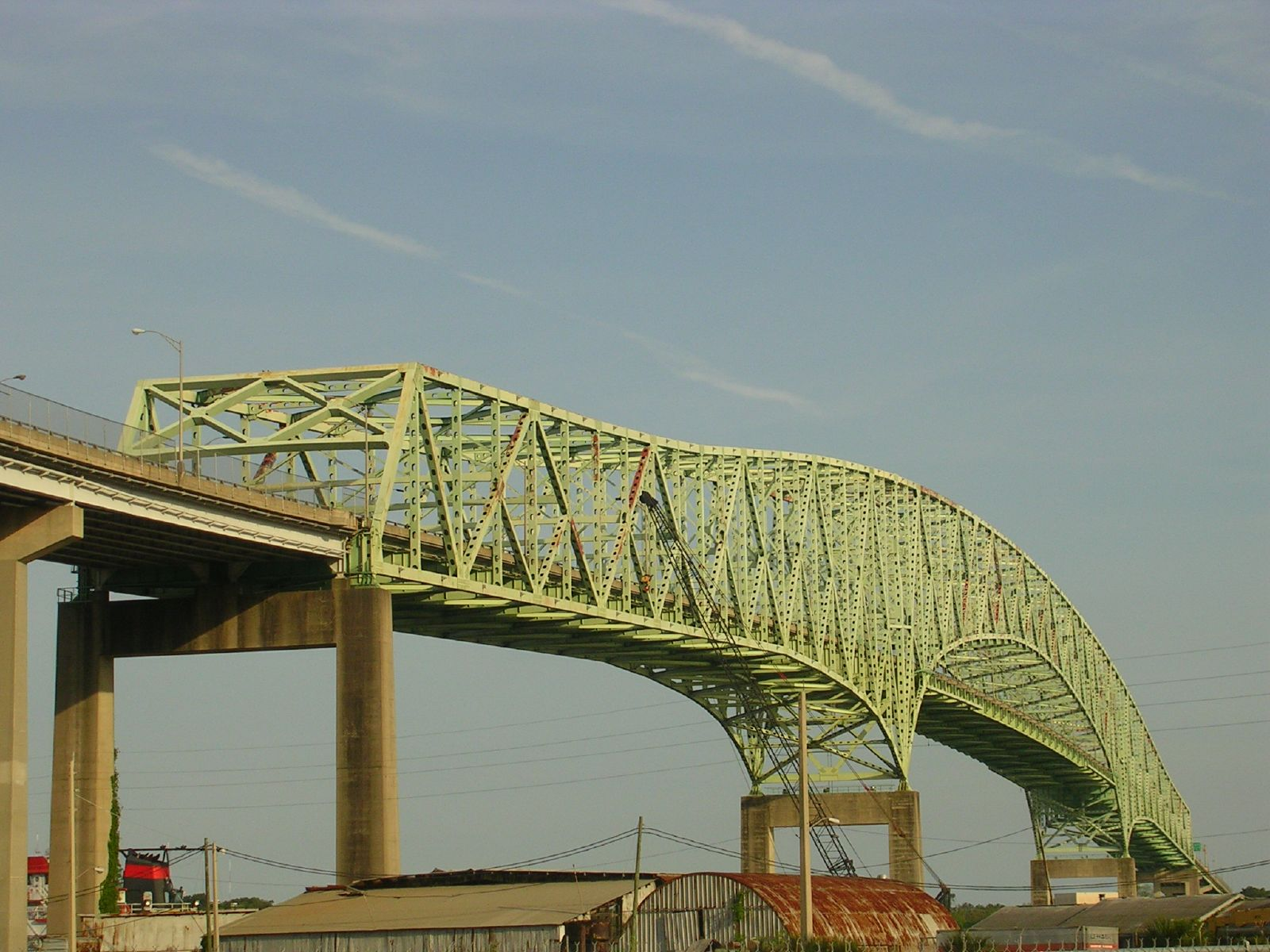
View of the Hart Bridge from the Eastside.

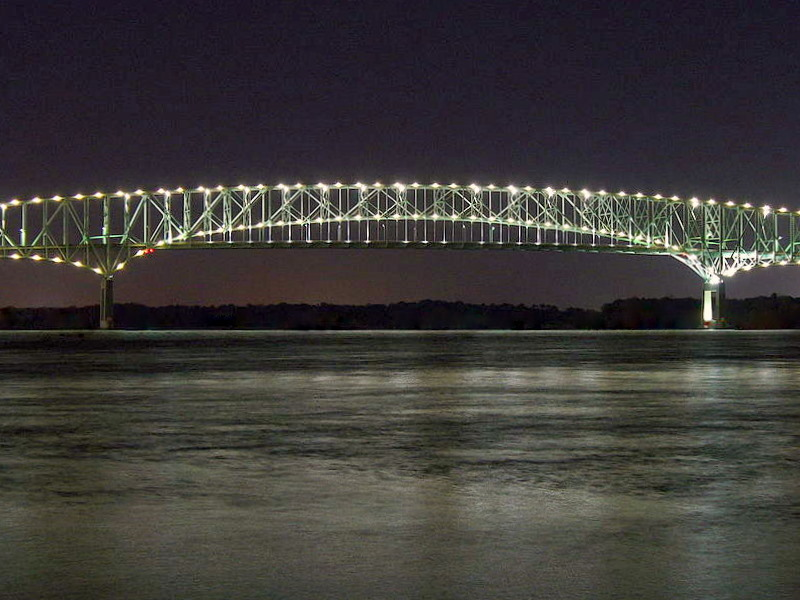
Hart Bridge at night.

== See also ==
- List of crossings of the St. Johns River
