= Beach Boulevard (Jacksonville) =

Highway in Florida, United States

State Road 212
- Beach Boulevard
- Beach Boulevard highlighted in red

Route information
- Maintained by FDOT
- Length: 14.826 mi (23.860 km)
- Existed: 1945–present

Major junctions
- West end: US 90 in Jacksonville
- East end: SR A1A in Jacksonville Beach

Location
- Country: United States
- State: Florida
- Counties: Duval

Highway system
- Florida State Highway System; Interstate; US; State; Former; Pre‑1945; Toll; Scenic
← SR 211	→ US 221

Beach Boulevard is an east–west road running from Jacksonville, Florida, United States east to Jacksonville Beach. Most of the road is part of U.S. Route 90 and unsigned as State Road 212 (SR 212), and a small portion at the eastern end is unsigned as County Road 212 (CR 212).

== Route description ==
SR 212 begins at the interchange between US 90 and SR 10, where it heads east through the commercial areas of Jacksonville. Near its eastern terminus, it crosses the B.B. McCormick Bridge, leaving Jacksonville and entering Jacksonville Beach, continuing east through commercial establishments, and ending at SR A1A in Jacksonville Beach. Beach Boulevard continues for two blocks eastward as CR 212.

== History ==
What is now called Beach Boulevard is actually an extension that was added to the original, post-Civil War road called Hogan Road, which stretched from the South bank of the St Johns River downtown, and led Southeast across the bridge over Little Pottsburg Creek and moved onward toward St Augustine. Hogan Road was named after the Hogan Family that were the first white settlers in Duval County. Hogan Road had two sections, the Northbank section moving north from the north bank of the St Johns River downtown, and the Southbank section moving south from the south bank of the St Johns River downtown. In the late 1930s, a new road called Beach Boulevard was built from the beaches toward Downtown Jacksonville until it intersected with the Southbank section of Hogan Road just west of what is now called Parental Home Road. The Southbank section of Hogan Road between Parental Home Road and the South bank of the St Johns River downtown was renamed Beach Boulevard and added to the new section, thus allowing the new Beach Boulevard to exist under one name from the South bank of the St Johns River, all the way out to the Atlantic Ocean. Other changes were made in the 1950s, when Interstate I-95 bisected the new Beach Blvd just south of the riverbank. All that is left of the original Hogan Road is the Northbank section downtown, and a small piece of the original Southbank section that stretches from just west of Parental Home Road South across the Little Pottsburg Creek, and ends at the intersection of Southside Boulevard.

Prior to the 1945 renumbering, it was State Road 376, added to the state road system by the Florida Legislature in 1937. The road was built on the right-of-way of the Florida East Coast Railway Mayport Branch (Jacksonville and Atlantic Railroad) to relieve traffic on the parallel Atlantic Boulevard (pre-1945 State Road 140, now State Road 10). Construction began before World War II but was suspended between fall 1941 and 1945. After the renumbering, it was reassigned to SR 212, and dedicated December 17, 1949, along with the B.B. McCormick Bridge over the Intracoastal Waterway.

In 2009, construction was completed on a six-lane, dual span, concrete beam fixed bridge with a 65-foot vertical clearance over the Intercoastal Waterway that replaced the former four-lane, dual span McCormick drawbridge.

== Major intersections ==
The entire route is in Duval County.

Location	mi	km	Destinations	Notes
Jacksonville	0.000	0.000	US 90 west (Atlantic Boulevard / SR 10)	Western terminus of SR 212 and Beach Boulevard
see US 90 (mile 393.897-408.723)
Jacksonville	6.98	11.23	I-295 – University of North Florida	I-295 exit 51
Jacksonville Beach	14.826	23.860	SR A1A (3rd Street) / CR 212 east	Eastern terminus of SR 212; western terminus of CR 212
Jacksonville Beach	14.965	24.084	1st Street	Eastern terminus of CR 212 and Beach Boulevard
1.000 mi = 1.609 km; 1.000 km = 0.621 mi
