= Jacksonville metropolitan area =

- Metropolitan Statistical Area
- Jacksonville, FL Metropolitan Statistical Area
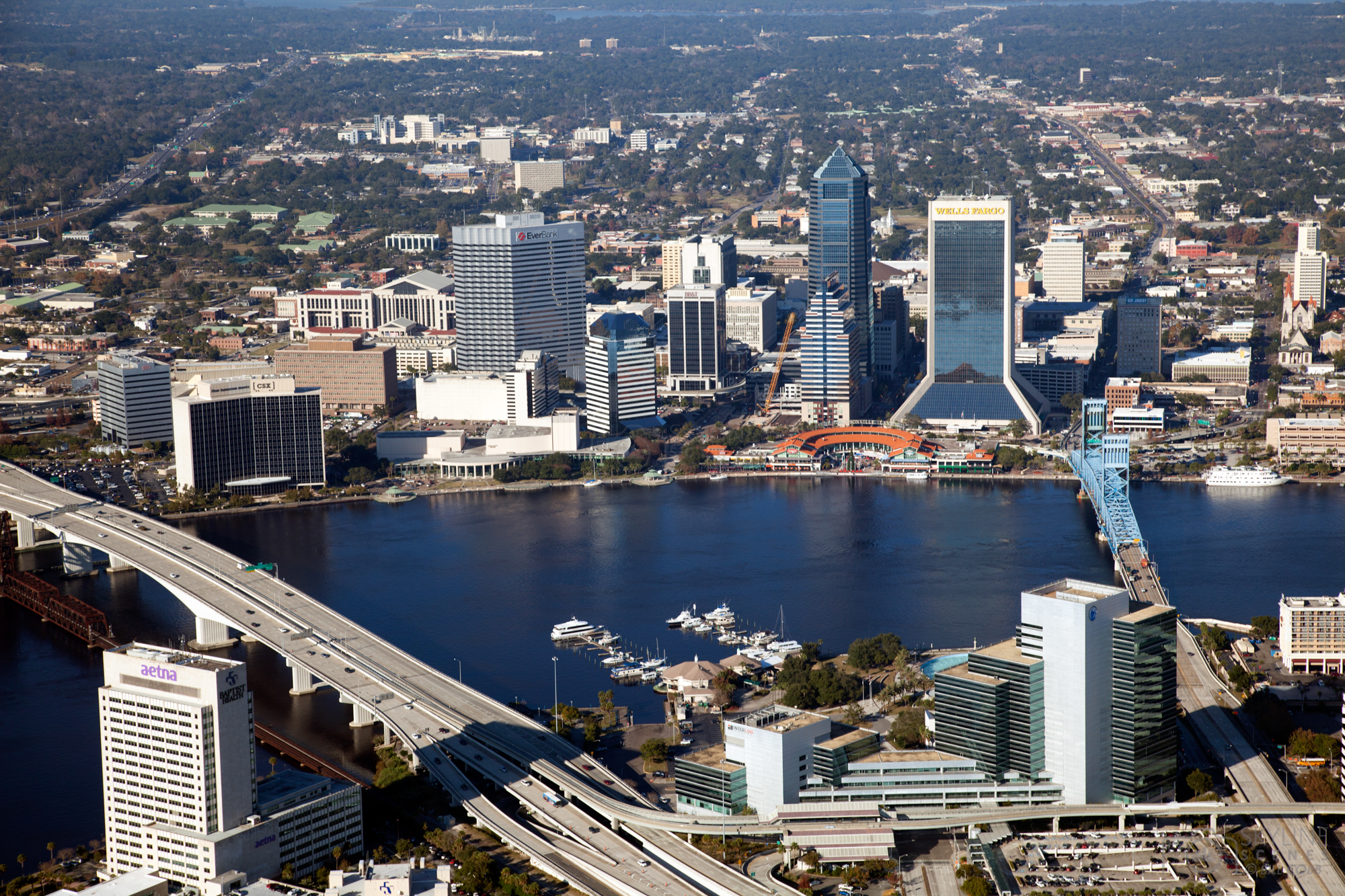
- Downtown Jacksonville viewed from the South Bank
Map of Jacksonville–Kingsland–Palatka, FL–GA CSA
City of Jacksonville
Jacksonville, FL MSA
Palatka, FL µSA
Kingsland, GA µSA
- Country: United States
- State(s): Florida, Georgia
- Largest city: Jacksonville
- Other cities: St. Augustine; Fernandina Beach; Middleburg; Green Cove Springs; Macclenny; Orange Park; Kingsland

Area
  - Total: 3,201.23 sq mi (8,291.15 km^{2})
- Elevation: 36 ft (11 m)
- Highest elevation: 213 ft (65 m)
- Lowest elevation: −13 ft (−4 m)

Population (2020)
  - Total: 1,605,848 (Metro); 1,733,937 (Combined)
  - Estimate (2025): 1,785,500 (Metro); 1,923,377 (Combined)
  - Rank: Metro: 38th in the U.S. Combined: 35th in the U.S.
  - Density: 535/sq mi (206.6/km^{2})

GDP
  - Total: $129.4 billion (2023)
- Time zone: UTC−05:00 (EST)
  - Summer (DST): UTC−04:00 (EDT)
- Area codes: 904, 324, 912, 352, 386

The Jacksonville Metropolitan Area, also called the First Coast, Metro Jacksonville, or Northeast Florida, is the metropolitan area centered on the principal city of Jacksonville, Florida and including the First Coast of North Florida. As of the 2020 census, the total population was 1,605,848. The Jacksonville–Kingsland–Palatka, FL–GA Combined Statistical Area (CSA) had a population of 1,733,937 in 2020 and was the 34th largest CSA in the United States. The Jacksonville metropolitan area is the 40th largest in the country and the fourth largest in the State of Florida, behind the Miami, Tampa, and Orlando metropolitan areas.

== Definitions ==
=== Metropolitan Statistical Area (MSA) ===
The Jacksonville Metropolitan Statistical Area (MSA) is an area designated by the U.S. Office of Management and Budget used for statistical purposes by the United States Census Bureau and other government agencies. The metropolitan statistical area had a total population of approximately 1,605,848 as of 2020 and is the 39th largest in the United States and the fourth largest in the state of Florida. The OMB defines the Jacksonville MSA as consisting of five counties. The components of the metropolitan area with their estimated 2020 populations are listed below:

- Jacksonville metropolitan statistical area (1,605,848)
  - Duval County, Florida (995,567)
  - St. Johns County, Florida (273,425)
  - Clay County, Florida (218,245)
  - Nassau County, Florida (90,352)
  - Baker County, Florida (28,259)

=== Combined Statistical Area (CSA) ===
The OMB also defines a slightly larger region as a Combined Statistical Area (CSA). In 2012 the OMB also defined the Jacksonville–Kingsland–Palatka, FL–GA Combined Statistical Area, which included metropolitan Jacksonville as well as the Palatka, Florida and Kingsland, Georgia Micropolitan Statistical Areas (comprising Putnam County, Florida and Camden County, Georgia). The CSA had a population of 1,733,937 in 2020 and was the 34th largest CSA. The components of the CSA with their 2020 census populations are listed below:

- Jacksonville, FL Metropolitan Area (1,733,937)
  - Palatka, FL Micropolitan area (73,321)
    - Putnam County, Florida (73,321)
  - Kingsland, GA Micropolitan area (54,768)
    - Camden County, Georgia (54,768)

== Demographics ==
Historical population
| Census | Pop. | Note | %± |
|---|---|---|---|
| 1900 | 39,733 | | — |
| 1910 | 75,163 | | 89.2% |
| 1920 | 113,540 | | 51.1% |
| 1930 | 155,503 | | 37.0% |
| 1940 | 210,143 | | 35.1% |
| 1950 | 304,029 | | 44.7% |
| 1960 | 529,532 | | 74.2% |
| 1970 | 621,519 | | 17.4% |
| 1980 | 737,541 | | 18.7% |
| 1990 | 925,213 | | 25.4% |
| 2000 | 1,122,750 | | 21.4% |
| 2010 | 1,345,596 | | 19.8% |
| 2020 | 1,605,848 | | 19.3% |
| 2025 (est.) | 1,785,500 | | 11.2% |
U.S. Decennial Census

=== 2020 census ===
As of the 2020 census, there were 1,605,848 people residing within the MSA.

| County | 2025 Estimate | 2020 Census | %± | Area | Density |
|---|---|---|---|---|---|
| Duval County | 1,062,963 | 995,567 | +6.77% | 762 sq mi (1,970 km^{2}) | 1,395/sq mi (539/km^{2}) |
| St. Johns County | 346,328 | 273,425 | +26.66% | 601 sq mi (1,560 km^{2}) | 576/sq mi (222/km^{2}) |
| Clay County | 239,593 | 218,245 | +9.78% | 604 sq mi (1,560 km^{2}) | 397/sq mi (153/km^{2}) |
| Nassau County | 106,879 | 90,352 | +18.29% | 649 sq mi (1,680 km^{2}) | 165/sq mi (64/km^{2}) |
| Baker County | 29,737 | 28,259 | +5.23% | 585.23 sq mi (1,515.7 km^{2}) | 51/sq mi (20/km^{2}) |
| Total | 1,785,500 | 1,605,848 | +11.19% | 3,201.23 sq mi (8,291.1 km^{2}) | 558/sq mi (215/km^{2}) |

=== 2010 census ===
As of the 2010 census, there were 1,345,596 people, 524,146 households, and 350,483 families residing within the MSA. The racial makeup of the MSA was 69.9% White, 21.8% African American, 0.4% Native American, 3.4% Asian, 0.1% Pacific Islander, 1.8% from other races, and 2.6% from two or more races. 12.9% were Hispanic or Latino of any race. The median income for a household in the MSA was $45,143, and the median income for a family was $51,327. Males had a median income of $35,537 versus $25,093 for females.

== Politics ==
The Jacksonville metropolitan area has historically been a Republican stronghold and is considered the most conservative among Florida's four largest metropolitan areas: Tampa Bay, Orlando, Miami, and Jacksonville. Duval County, the most populous county in the region, has predominantly supported Republican candidates, having voted Democratic only once since 1980. However, due to demographic shifts, including a growing Black population, the county voted Democratic in the 2020 presidential election for the first time since 1976.

Jacksonville Metropolitan Presidential election results
| Year | Democratic | Republican | Third parties |
|---|---|---|---|
| 2024 | 40.1% 353,278 | 58.4% 513,626 | 1.5% 13,172 |
| 2020 | 42.9% 372,324' | 55.7% 483,665 | 1.5% 12,876 |
| 2016 | 39.1% 289,606 | 56.6% 419,879 | 4.3% 31,948 |
| 2012 | 40.4% 270,103 | 59.6% 398,686 | 0% 0 |

== Education ==
=== Higher education ===
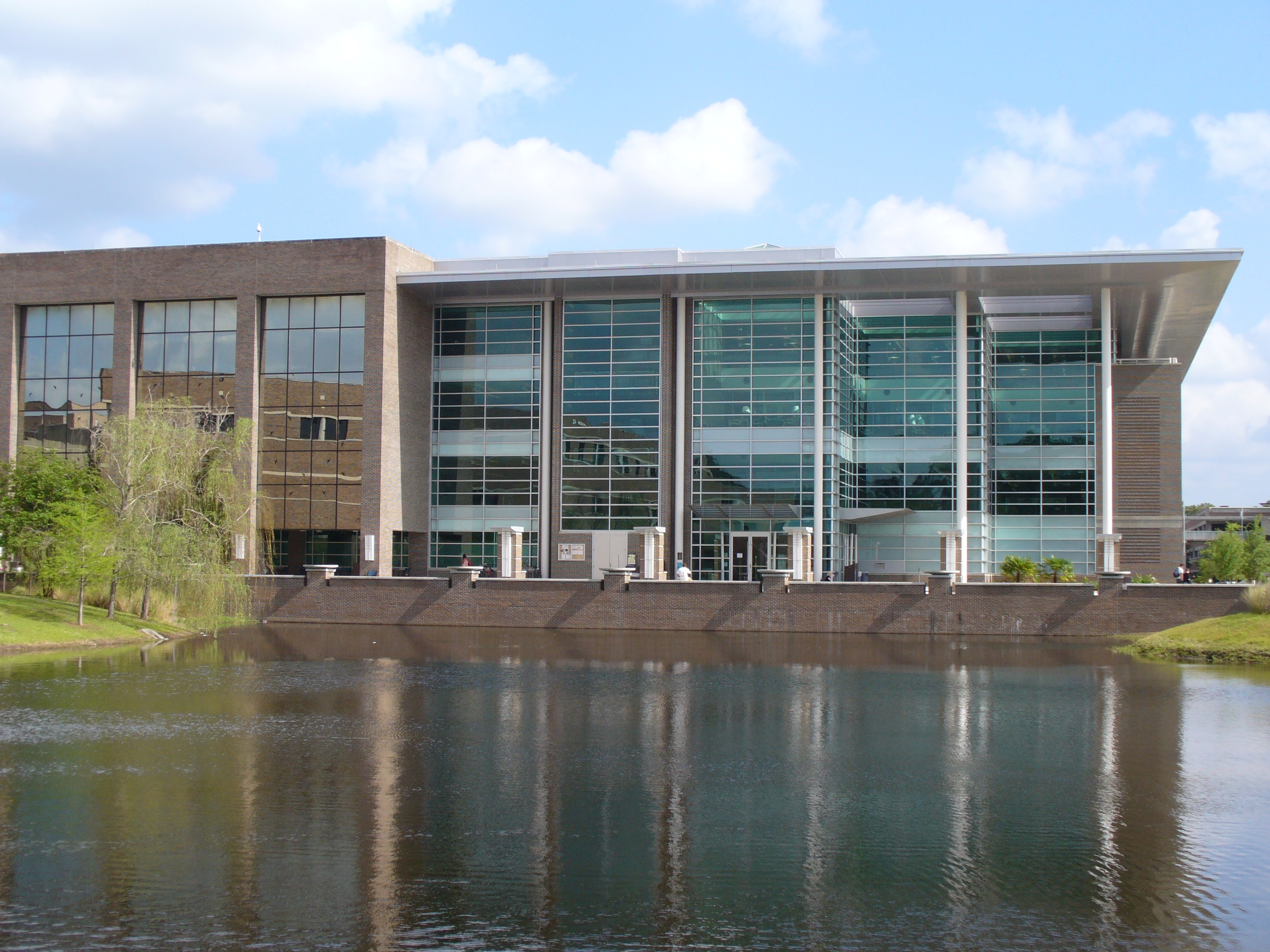
University of North Florida

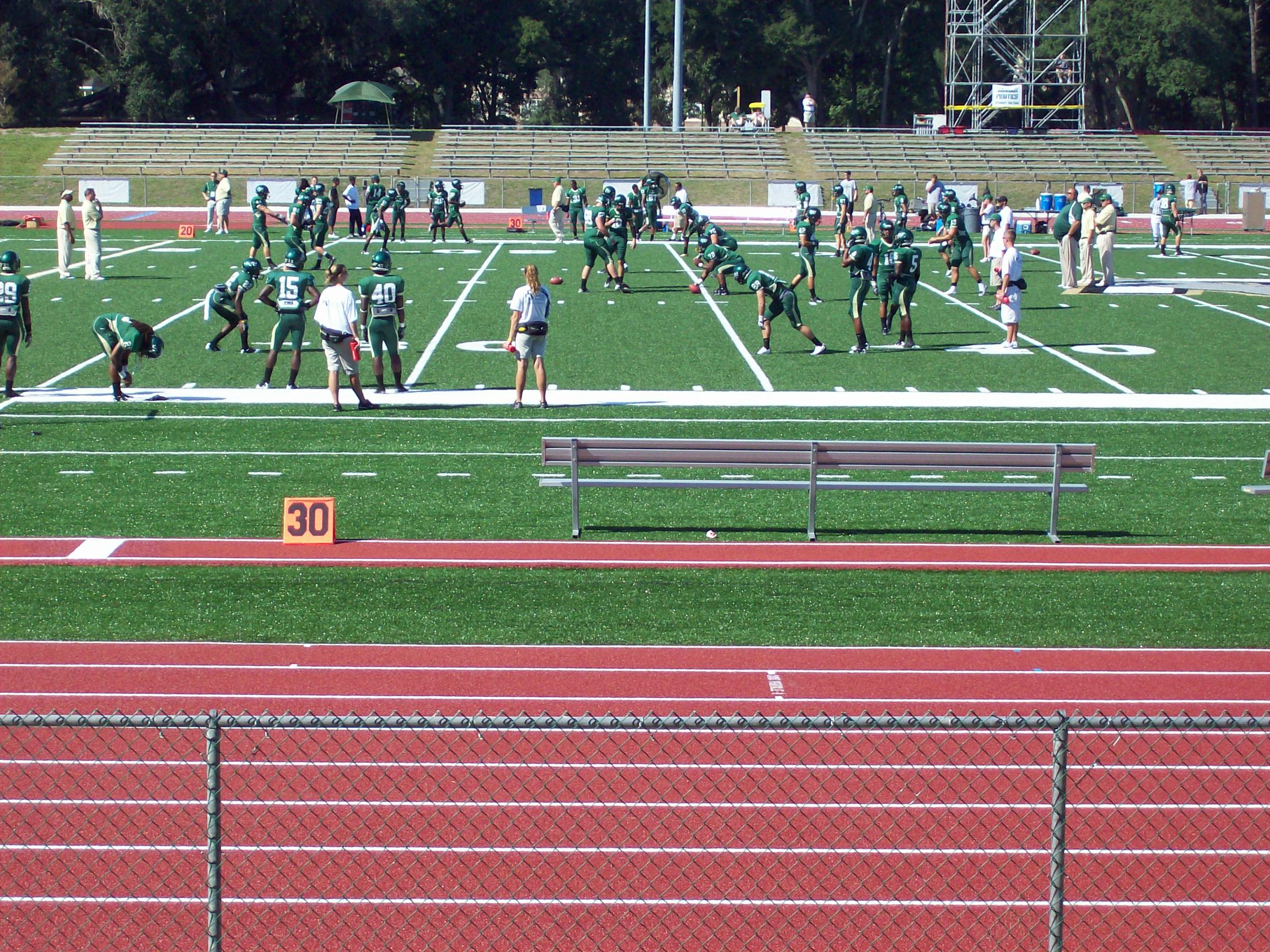
Jacksonville University

Higher education in the Jacksonville area is offered at many institutions. There are three public institutions in the area. University of North Florida (UNF), founded in 1969, is a public university in southeastern Jacksonville. It has over 17,000 students and offers a variety of bachelor's, master's, and doctoral programs. Florida State College at Jacksonville (FSCJ), is a public state college located in downtown Jacksonville with satellite campuses around the city. St. Johns River State College is a state college with campuses in St. Augustine, Orange Park, and Palatka. Many private schools are also located in the area. Edward Waters College, founded in 1866, is Jacksonville's oldest institution of higher education, as well as Florida's oldest historically black college. Jacksonville University (JU), established in 1934, is a private, four-year institution located along the St. Johns River with over 3,500 students. Flagler College is a liberal arts college located in St. Augustine. Noted for its campus, which includes Henry Flagler's former Ponce de León Hotel, it is currently included in The Princeton Review's Best 366 Colleges Rankings.

=== Public schools ===
The public school districts for Greater Jacksonville are all managed by school boards, with each county having its own board. The Duval County School Board is the largest in the area and the 22nd largest in the United States with over 155,000 students. In 2010, it was home to two of the top 20 high schools in the country, Stanton College Preparatory School and Paxon School for Advanced Studies. The St. Johns County School District, Clay County School District, Nassau County School District, and Baker County School District manage the public schools in their respective counties.

== Transportation ==
=== Airports ===
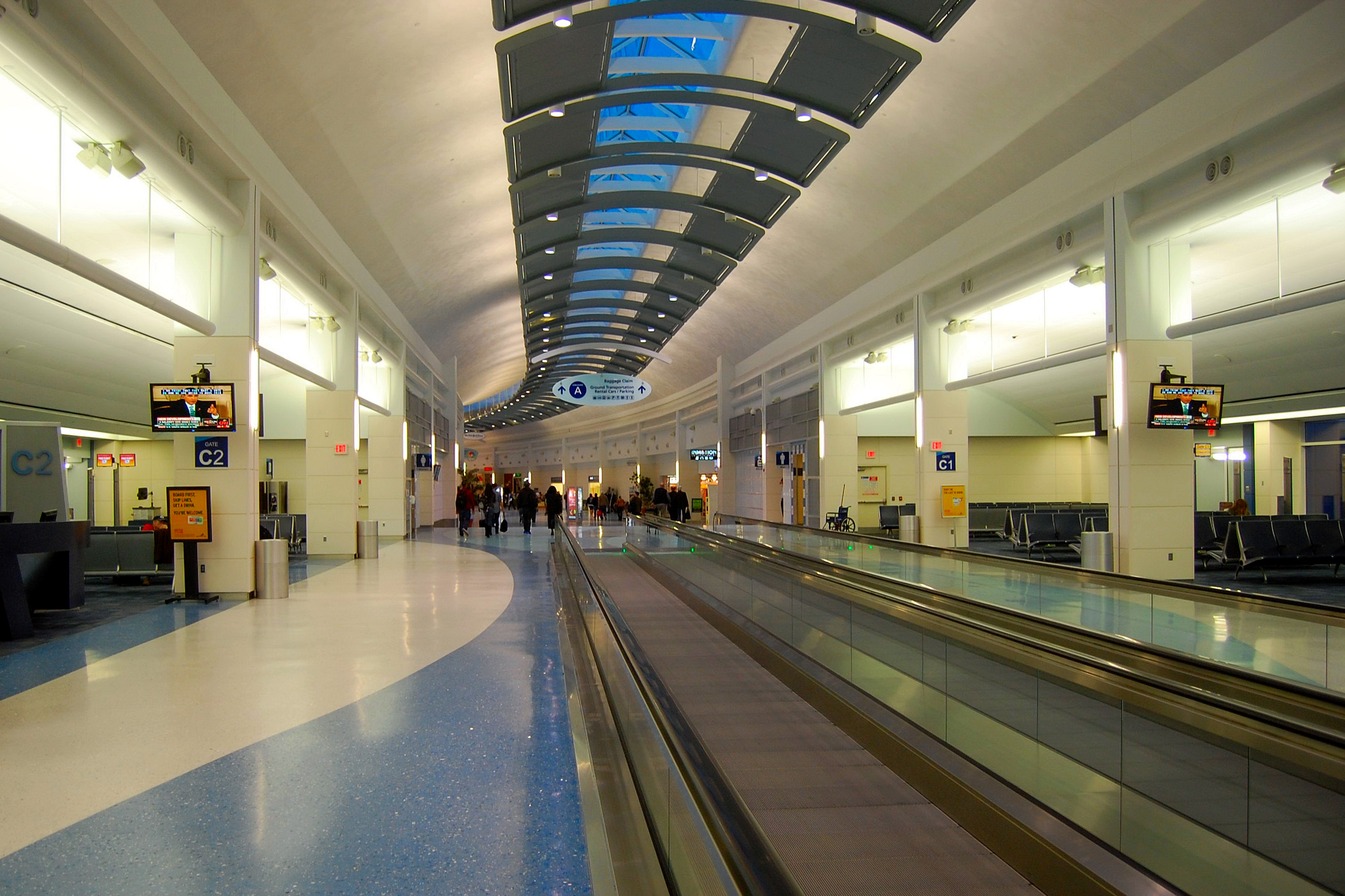
Jacksonville International Airport Concourse C

Greater Jacksonville is served by one major airport – Jacksonville International Airport, which handled approximately 7.2 million passengers in 2019. The airport has three concourses with only two being operational. Concourse B was demolished in 2009 due to a significant decrease in passengers and flights. It is scheduled to be rebuilt when traffic increases at the airport, which was projected to happen in 2013. The airport has gone through many changes over the recent years. Both Concourse A and Concourse C were both rebuilt with ten gates each and moving walkways. Future plans call for expanding the newly built concourses by 2020 and possibly adding a people mover system to the airport and connecting the airport with the onsite Clarion Hotel via a moving walkway.

=== Seaports ===
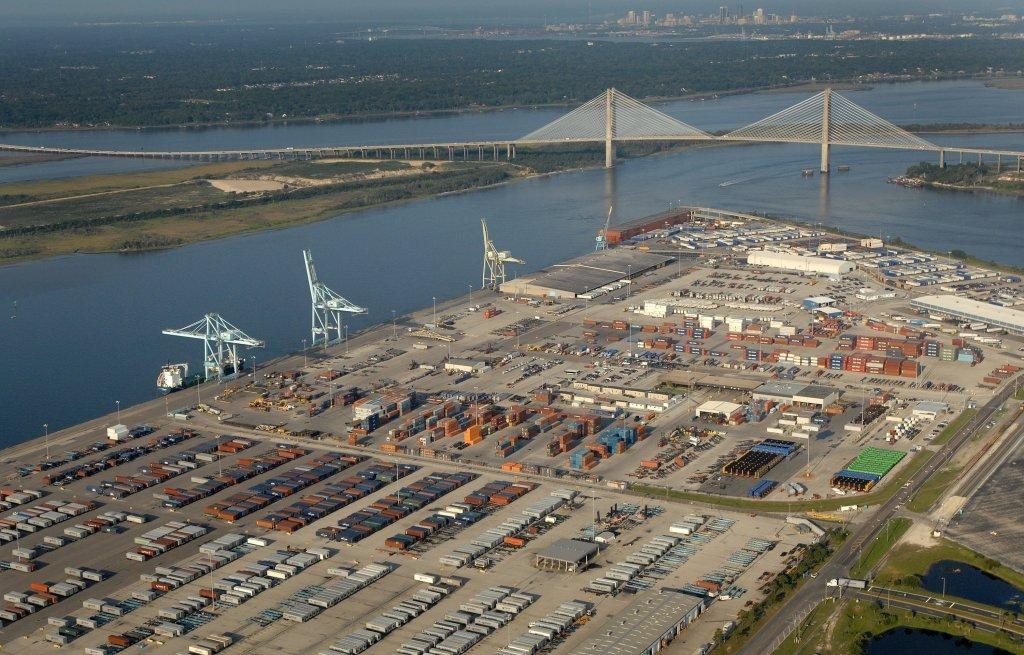
Blount Island Marine Terminal of JAXPORT

The Port of Jacksonville is located in Duval County on the St. Johns River and is operated by Jacksonville Port Authority, branded as JAXPORT. Over 100 countries import and export goods through the port. JAXPORT owns three cargo facilities: the Blount Island Marine Terminal, the Talleyrand Marine Terminal and the Dames Point Marine Terminal. The Port of Jacksonville imports the second largest amount of automobiles on the east coast. The port authority also operates a cruise terminal. Opened in 2003 as a "temporary" terminal, cruise ships have set sail from the 63,000-square foot facility ever since. Current cruises from Jacksonville visit the Bahamas on four- or five-day voyages aboard the Carnival Elation.

=== Public transportation ===
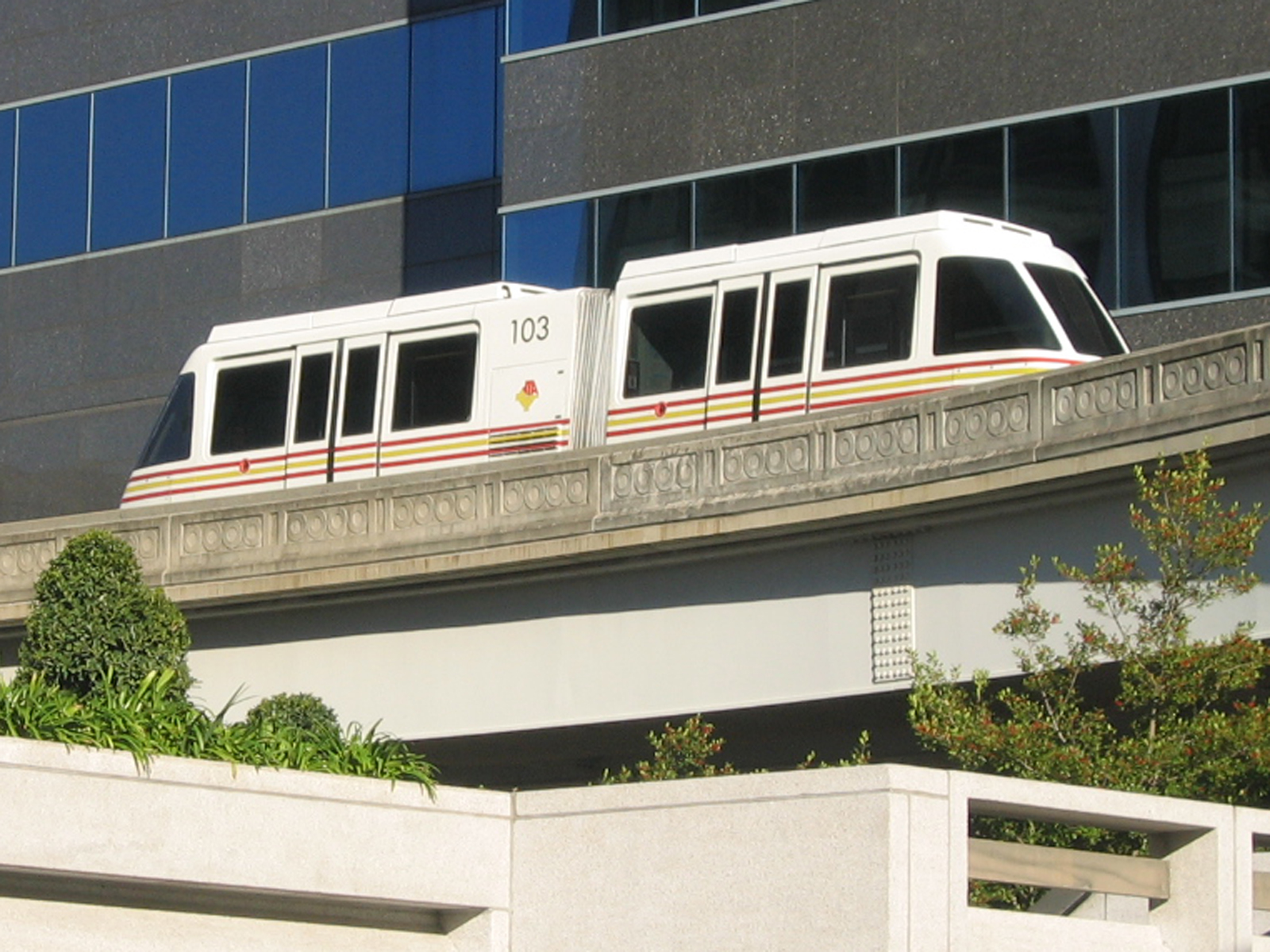
JTA Skyway in downtown Jacksonville

Jacksonville Transportation Authority (JTA) is the public transit agency serving the Jacksonville area with bus service, trolleys, paratransit, and a people mover. The people mover, known as the JTA Skyway, is located in downtown Jacksonville, and operates 8 stations along a 2.5-mile (4.0 km) track. Bus service as well as paratransit service is provided around Duval County and partially in Clay County. JTA operates three trolley lines in three different neighborhoods: Downtown, Riverside, and Jacksonville Beach. The entire JTA system has a daily ridership of over 42,000.

=== Roadways ===
The Jacksonville metropolitan area is served by four interstate highways operated by the Florida Department of Transportation (FDOT). I-95 runs north to south, starting in Nassau County and leaving in St. Johns County. I-10 runs west to east, terminating in downtown Jacksonville at I-95. This intersection is the busiest in the area, with more than 200,000 vehicles traveling it each day. I-295 serves as a beltway routing around the city and connects to I-10 and I-95 while serving all areas of Jacksonville. I-795 is a future expressway that will connect the southeastern section of I-295 with I-95.

Three other expressways also serve the area and are maintained by FDOT. Arlington Expressway (FL SR 115) connects downtown Jacksonville with the Arlington neighborhood via the Mathews Bridge and travels eastward to Atlantic Beach. The Commodore Point Expressway connects downtown Jacksonville with the Southside at Beach Boulevard (US 90), which continues eastward to Jacksonville Beach. Butler Bouleveard (SR 202) begins in southeast Jacksonville at Philips Highway (US 1) and ends in southern Jacksonville Beach at 3rd Street South (SR A1A). The road has become one of the busiest roads in the metro area.

SR 23 (also known as the First Coast Expressway), maintained by Florida's Turnpike Enterprise, is a controlled-access toll road serving as an outer bypass around the southwest quadrant of Jacksonville. Its northern terminus is at US 90, just above I-10 in Jacksonville and it extends through Clay County to its, as of 2026, current southern terminus at US 17 near Green Cove Springs. Plans are to extend the route across the St. Johns River, through St. Johns County to I-95, with completion expected by 2032.

==== Interstates ====
- I-10
- I-95
- I-295
- Florida State Road 9B

==== U.S. Routes ====
- US 1
  - U.S. Route 1 Alternate (Jacksonville, Florida)
  - U.S. Route 1 Business (St. Augustine, Florida)
- US 17
- US 23
- US 90
  - U.S. Route 90 Alternate (Jacksonville, Florida)
- US 301

==== State Highways ====
- SR A1A
- SR 2
- SR 5
  - SR 5A
- SR 8
- SR 9
  - SR 9A
  - SR 9B
- SR 10
- SR 13
- SR 15
- SR 16
- SR 19
- SR 20
- SR 21
- SR 23
- SR 26
- SR 100
- SR 101
- SR 102
- SR 103
- SR 104
- SR 105
- SR 109
- SR 111
- SR 113
- SR 114
- SR 115
  - SR 115A
- SR 116
- SR 117
- SR 121
- SR 122
- SR 126
- SR 128
- SR 129
- SR 134
- SR 139
- SR 152
- SR 200
- SR 202
- SR 206
- SR 207
- SR 208
- SR 210
- SR 211
- SR 212
- SR 224
- SR 228
  - SR 228A
- SR 230
- SR 243
- SR 312

== See also ==
- Florida statistical areas
