= List of county roads in Duval County, Florida =

- County road shields used in Florida

Highway names
- Interstates: Interstate X (I-X)
- US Highways: U.S. Highway X (US X)
- State: State Road X (SR X)
- County: County Road X (CR-X)

System links
- County roads in Florida; County roads in Duval County

Duval County, Florida (located in north-east Florida) operates a system of county roads that serve all portions of the county.

The numbers and routes of all Florida highways are assigned by the Florida Department of Transportation (FDOT), while county road numbers are assigned by the counties, with guidance from FDOT. North-south routes are generally assigned odd numbers, while east-west routes are generally assigned even numbers.

== List of county roads in Duval County, Florida ==
Route	Road Name(s)	From	To	Notes
CR 21B	Commonwealth Avenue	CR 103 (Lane Avenue)	McDuff Avenue	Former SR 21B
CR 21D	Golfair Boulevard / Moncrief Road	SR 111 (West Edgewood Avenue)	I-95 / SR 122 (Golfair Boulevard)	Former SR 21D
CR 99	Monument Road			
CR 101A	San Pablo Road	SR 202 (J. Turner Butler Boulevard)	SR 10 (Atlantic Boulevard)	Former SR 101A
CR 103	Lane Avenue	US 90 (West Beaver Street) / SR 103 (Lane Avenue)	Old Kings Road	Former SR 103
CR 106	Capper Road	Woodley Creek Boulevard	SR 115 (Lem Turner Road)	Former SR 106
CR 106B	North Campus Boulevard	CR 106 (Capper Road)	SR 104 (Dunn Avenue)	Former SR 106B
CR 109A	Cesery Boulevard			Former SR 109A
CR 110	Duval Road	SR 104 (Dunn Avenue) Biscayne Boulevard	I-295 (Jacksonville West Beltway) / SR 243 (International Airport Boulevard) SR 102 (Airport Road)	Former SR 110; SR 243 and Biscayne Boulevard split CR 110 in two.
CR 115A	Soutel Drive	US 1 / US 23 (New Kings Road)	SR 115 (Lem Turner Road)	Former SR 115A
CR 115C	Chaffee Road	SR 228 (Normandy Boulevard)	US 90 (West Beaver Street)	Former SR 115C
CR 116	Sunbeam Road	SR 13 (San Jose Boulevard)	US 1 (Philips Highway)	Former SR 116
CR 117	Jones Road / Garden Street / Trout River Boulevard	US 90 (West Beaver Street)	US 1 / US 23 (New Kings Road)	Former SR 117
CR 119	Otis Road	US 90 (Beaver Street West)	CR 119 at the Nassau county line	Former SR 119
CR 121	Brandy Branch Road	US 90 (Beaver Street West)	CR 121 at the Nassau county line	Former SR 121
CR 163	Busch Drive	SR 105 (Zoo Parkway)	US 17 (Main Street) / SR 104 (Busch Drive)	Former SR 163
CR 203	Ponta Vedra Boulevard	CR 203 at the St. Johns county line	SR A1A (3rd Street)	Former SR 203
CR 211	Ortega Boulevard / Grand Avenue / San Juan Avenue	US 17 (Roosevelt Boulevard)	SR 128 (San Juan Avenue) / SR 211 (Herschel Street)	Former SR 211
CR 212	Beach Boulevard	US 90 (Beach Boulevard) / SR A1A (3rd Street)	1st Street	Former SR 212
CR 213	Old Middleburg Road / Lenox Avenue	SR 134 (103rd Street)	Luna Street / Rayford Street	Former SR 213
CR 217	Yellow Water Road	CR 217 in Maxville at the Clay county line SR 228 (Normandy Boulevard)	SR 228 (Normandy Boulevard) US 90 in Baldwin	Former SR 217; SR 228 splits CR 217 in two.
CR 228	Maxville–Macclenny Road	CR 228 on the Maxville–Jacksonville line at the Baker county line	US 301 / SR 228	Former SR 228
CR 228	Post Street	SR 129 (McDuff Avenue) / SR 228 (Post Street)	SR 211 (Riverside Avenue)	Former US 17 / SR 15 / SR 228
