= Florida State Road 210 =

State highway in Florida, United States

State Road 210
- SR 210 highlighted in red

Route information
- Maintained by FDOT
- Length: 6.10 mi (9.82 km)

Major junctions
- West end: Old Kings Road in Jacksonville
- US 1 / US 23 / SR 15 in Jacksonville; SR 115A in Jacksonville; SR 111 in Jacksonville; US 1 / US 23 / SR 15 in Jacksonville
- East end: West 13th Street in Jacksonville

Location
- Country: United States
- State: Florida
- Counties: Duval

Highway system
- Florida State Highway System; Interstate; US; State; Former; Pre‑1945; Toll; Scenic
← SR 208	→ SR 211

State Road 210 (SR 210), locally known as Moncrief Road, is a state highway in the Northside of Jacksonville, within the northeastern part of the U.S. state of Florida. It travels approximately 6.10 miles (9.82 km) extending diagonally from its northwestern terminus at Old Kings Road to its southeastern terminus at West 13th Street.

== Route description ==
SR 210 is a four-lane street for most of its length. It begins at Old Kings Road, (near I-295), followed by New Kings Road (US 1 / US 23 / SR 15), and Soutel Drive (SR 115A). Then it travels through several neighborhoods, meeting roads like Avenue B, and intersects with Edgewood Avenue W (SR 111), followed by West 45th Street. Passing the CSX railroad tracks, it intersects Golfair Boulevard, which head towards to I-95, West 33rd Street, West 26th Street, Myrtle Avenue N, then intersects with Martin Luther King Jr. Parkway (US 1 / SR 15) before it ends at West 13th Street near I-95.

== Major intersections ==
The entire route is in Jacksonville, Duval County.

mi	km	Destinations	Notes
0.0	0.0	Old Kings Road	Western terminus
0.84	1.35	US 1 / US 23 / SR 15 (New Kings Road)	
1.32	2.12	SR 115A (Soutel Drive)	
3.31	5.33	Avenue B north	Becomes north as Restlawn Drive
3.58	5.76	SR 111 (Edgewood Avenue West)	
4.36	7.02	West 45th Street	
4.94	7.95	Golfair Boulevard east	Becomes west as West 34th Street, east towards I-95 interchange
5.0	8.0	West 33rd Street	
5.39	8.67	West 26th Street west	
5.44	8.75	Myrtle Avenue North	
5.75	9.25	US 1 / SR 15 (Martin Luther King Jr. Parkway)	East towards I-95 interchange
6.10	9.82	West 13th Street	Eastern terminus
1.000 mi = 1.609 km; 1.000 km = 0.621 mi

== See also ==
- Transportation in Jacksonville, Florida
