= Florida State Road 111 =

State highway in Florida, United States

State Road 111
- SR 111 highlighted in red

Route information
- Maintained by FDOT
- Length: 11.875 mi (19.111 km)

Major junctions
- South end: SR 21 in Jacksonville
- I-10 in Jacksonville; US 90 in Jacksonville; US 1 / US 23 in Jacksonville; I-95 in Jacksonville
- North end: US 17 in Jacksonville

Location
- Country: United States
- State: Florida

Highway system
- Florida State Highway System; Interstate; US; State; Former; Pre‑1945; Toll; Scenic
| ← I-110 | → SR 112 |

State Road 111 (SR 111) is a 11.875-mile-long (19.111 km) state highway in Jacksonville, within the northeastern part of the U.S. state of Florida. It travels from SR 21 in Lake Shore, heading north, then east to end at US 17 in Oceanway. The road is a four-lane highway for its entire length, with a median division in some segments.

== Route description ==
Starting as Cassat Avenue, SR 111's southern terminus is at SR 21 (Blanding Boulevard), from which it heads due north as a four-lane street through residential areas, with commercial businesses dotting the street. The road's first major intersection is with SR 128 (San Juan Avenue), in which SR 111 becomes more commercial. It continues north, with intersections with Park Street, SR 228 (Normandy Boulevard/Post Street), CR 213 (Lenox Avenue), before an interchange with I-10. Less than a mile north of the I-10 interchange, SR 111 merges with Edgewood Avenue South, and becoming a divided highway as the road continues north. The road changes names again to Edgewood Avenue North after crossing US 90 (West Beaver Street).

Continuing north, SR 111, still a mix of residential and commercial businesses, crosses Commonwealth Avenue, followed by a CSX rail line. At Old Kings Road, the road turns to the northeast and crosses over a CSX rail depot, followed by New Kings Road (US 1/US 23). East of this interchange, SR 111 changes names to Edgewood Avenue West and the divided highway ends as the road continues northeast through residential areas on Jacksonville's north side. East of Moncrief Road, SR 111 becomes increasingly more commercial as it heads to SR 115 (Lem Turner Road) before an interchange with I-95. East of the interchange, it changes names to Tallulah Avenue and heads southeast, towards a crossing of the St. Johns River, through residential areas as it meets its northern terminus at US 17 (North Main Street).

== History ==
Prior to the consolidation of Jacksonville and Duval County, Edgewood Ave North formed the northwestern boundary of the City of Jacksonville.

=== Former SR 111A ===
State Road 111A
- Location: St. Johns River-Cassat Avenue

State Road 111A (SR 111A) was a state highway in Jacksonville, within the northeastern part of the U.S. state of Florida. Edgewood Ave South begins at the St. Johns River, crossing SR 211 (St. Johns Avenue) and continuing northwest through Avondale, passing Riverside Avenue, Park Street, and US 17 (Roosevelt Boulevard). It then crosses SR 228 (Post Street), College Street, and SR 213 (Lenox Avenue) before an interchange with Interstate 10 (I-10), and intersecting Cassat Avenue and becoming SR 111. There is no current signage indicating its status as a state or county road.

== Major intersections ==
The entire route is in Jacksonville, Duval County.

| mi | km | Destinations | Notes |
|---|---|---|---|
| 0.000 | 0.000 | SR 21 (Blanding Boulevard) | |
| 0.423 | 0.681 | SR 128 (San Juan Avenue) | |
| 2.288 | 3.682 | SR 228 (Normandy Boulevard / Post Street) | |
| 2.704 | 4.352 | Lenox Avenue (CR 213) | |
| 2.84 | 4.57 | I-10 (SR 8) | I-10 exit 358 |
| 3.562 | 5.732 | US 90 (West Beaver Street / SR 10) | |
| 4.172 | 6.714 | To I-295 / Commonwealth Avenue (CR 21B) | |
| 6.674 | 10.741 | US 1 / US 23 (New Kings Road / SR 15) | |
| 9.812 | 15.791 | SR 115 (Lem Turner Road) to I-95 | |
| 10.51 | 16.91 | I-95 (SR 9) – Savannah, Daytona Beach | I-95 exit 357 |
| 11.875 | 19.111 | US 17 (Main Street / SR 5) | |
1.000 mi = 1.609 km; 1.000 km = 0.621 mi
