= Nocatee Parkway =

County Road 210
- Nocatee Parkway

Route information
- Length: 4.83 mi (7.77 km)
- Existed: January 2008–present

Major junctions
- West end: US 1 near Jacksonville
- East end: Davis Park Road in Nocatee

Location
- Country: United States
- State: Florida
- Counties: Duval, St. Johns

Highway system
- County roads in Florida

Nocatee Parkway is a 4.83-mile (7.77 km) freeway in the southeasternmost point in Jacksonville, in the community of Nocatee, and in the counties of Duval and St. Johns. The road provides easy access to Jacksonville, Interstate 95 (I-95) and State Route 9B (Future I-795) for residents of Nocatee and elsewhere. The parkway is also critical for hurricane evacuation route for Beaches-area residents. The entire parkway is part of County Road 210 (CR 210).

== Route description ==
The route begins at U.S. Route 1 (US 1), with short stub roads near the exit and entrance points. The parkway travels in an east to northeastward direction from US 1, with a partial cloverleaf interchange at Valley Ridge Road followed by a single-point urban interchange at Crosswater Parkway. Finally, the parkway has an intersection with Davis Park Road, ending the freeway, and becoming Palm Valley Road.

== History ==
The construction of this parkway began in January 2008, with a cost of $150 million. The construction included clearing and grubbing, storm drainage, construction of single and double barrel box culverts, the construction of 8 bridges, transmission/distribution utility installations, drilled shaft construction, MSE wall, installation of concrete curb, sidewalk, medians, signalization, striping, and sodding. In October 2010, the parkway was completed, a decade ahead of schedule.

== Exit list ==
All exits are unnumbered.

County	Location	mi	km	Destinations	Notes
St. Johns	Nocatee	0.0	0.0	US 1 – Jacksonville, St. Augustine	Western terminus of County Road 210 and Nocatee Parkway
Duval	Jacksonville	1.58	2.54	Valley Ridge Road	
St. Johns	Nocatee	3.01	4.84	Crosswater Parkway	
St. Johns	Nocatee	4.83	7.77	Davis Park Road	Eastern terminus of Nocatee Parkway, County Road 210 continues as Palm Valley Road
1.000 mi = 1.609 km; 1.000 km = 0.621 mi: Route transition
