= Florida State Road 163 =

State highway in Florida, United States

State Road 163

Route information
- Maintained by FDOT
- Length: 2.194 mi (3.531 km)

Location
- Country: United States
- State: Florida

Highway system
- Florida State Highway System; Interstate; US; State; Former; Pre‑1945; Toll; Scenic

State Road 163 (SR 163) was a 2.194-mile-long (3.531 km) north–south state highway in Duval County. It traveled in a question mark shape, completely within the northeastern part of Jacksonville.

== Route description ==
SR 163 began at an intersection with SR 105 (Heckscher Drive), near the Jacksonville Zoo and Gardens. It headed to the north before curving to the northeast. The road curved back to the north, then to the northwest and west, before meeting its northern terminus, an intersection with U.S. Route 17 (US 17; North Main Street) at the southeastern edge of the Anheuser-Busch brewery. This intersection also marks the eastern terminus of SR 104 (Dunn Avenue).

== Major intersections ==
The entire route was in Jacksonville, Duval County.

mi	km	Destinations	Notes
0.000	0.000	SR 105 (Heckscher Drive)	Southern terminus
2.194	3.531	US 17 (Main Street / SR 5) / SR 104 west (Busch Drive)	Northern terminus of SR 163; eastern terminus of SR 104
1.000 mi = 1.609 km; 1.000 km = 0.621 mi
