= Florida State Road 128 =

State highway in Florida, United States

State Road 128
- San Juan Avenue
- Florida State Road 128 highlighted in red

Route information
- Maintained by FDOT
- Length: 2.500 mi (4.023 km)

Major junctions
- West end: SR 103 in Jacksonville
- US 17 in Jacksonville
- East end: SR 211 in Jacksonville

Location
- Country: United States
- State: Florida
- Counties: Duval

Highway system
- Florida State Highway System; Interstate; US; State; Former; Pre‑1945; Toll; Scenic
← SR 126	→ US 129

State Road 128 (SR 128), locally known as San Juan Avenue, is a 2.500-mile-long (4.023 km) east–west state highway in the inner urban Westside neighborhood of Jacksonville, in the U.S. state of Florida. It extends from SR 103 at its western terminus to SR 211 at its eastern terminus.

== Route description ==
SR 128 begins at the three-way intersection of San Juan Avenue and Lane Avenue (SR 103), with SR 128 heading east as a four-lane street with a center turn lane through residential and commercial areas of the Hyde Grove, Hyde Park, Lake Shore, Fairfax, and Ortega neighborhoods of Jacksonville. About one mile (1.6 km) east of its western terminus at Lane Avenue, SR 128 crosses the Cedar River in the Lake Shore neighborhood and becomes more residential than commercial east of the crossing, heading towards intersections with Cassat Avenue (SR 111), followed by Blanding Boulevard (SR 21) just two blocks to the east. Three blocks east of Blanding Boulevard, San Juan Avenue crosses a double-tracked railway right at the western end of the intersection with US 17/SR 15 (Roosevelt Boulevard), ending the center lane for SR 128 east of the intersection, and passes by the Roosevelt Square Mall at the southeast end of the intersection. It continues for three blocks as a four-lane highway to SR 128's eastern terminus at Herschel Street (SR 211). San Juan Avenue continues east of Herschel Street under the designation of SR 211 as a two-lane road, heading towards the Ortega Bridge three blocks east of SR 128's eastern terminus.

== Major intersections ==
The entire route is in Jacksonville, Duval County.

mi	km	Destinations	Notes
0.000	0.000	SR 103 (Lane Avenue) to I-10	Western terminus
1.489	2.396	SR 111 (Cassat Avenue) to I-10	
1.751	2.818	SR 21 (Blanding Boulevard)	
2.096	3.373	US 17 (Roosevelt Boulevard / SR 15)	
2.500	4.023	SR 211 north (Herschel Street) / San Juan Avenue (CR 211 south)	Eastern terminus
1.000 mi = 1.609 km; 1.000 km = 0.621 mi
