= Florida State Road 152 =

State highway in Florida, United States

State Road 152
- Baymeadows Road
- Florida State Road 152 highlighted in red

Route information
- Maintained by FDOT
- Length: 6.417 mi (10.327 km)

Major junctions
- West end: SR 13 in Jacksonville
- US 1 in Jacksonville; I-95 in Jacksonville
- East end: I-295 in Jacksonville

Location
- Country: United States
- State: Florida
- Counties: Duval

Highway system
- Florida State Highway System; Interstate; US; State; Former; Pre‑1945; Toll; Scenic
← SR 145	→ SR 155

State Road 152 (SR 152), locally known as Baymeadows Road, is a 6.4-mile (10.3 km) state highway in Jacksonville, within the northeastern part of the U.S. state of Florida. It is a main east-west road in Southside Jacksonville, extending from an intersection with SR 13 (San Jose Boulevard) in the west to an interchange with I-295 in the east.

== Route description ==
West of the western terminus, the road continues as a residential street, Holly Grove Avenue, heading toward the St. Johns River. East of Florida State Road 13 it runs east-northeast over a bridge over Goodbys Creek, a tributary of the St. Johns that also ran beneath SR 13 south of that terminus. East of that bridge, SR 152 serves as the border between two residential neighborhoods; Brierwood to the north and Craven to the south. The road turns directly east after the intersection of Craven Road and Deermoss Way East. The surroundings become less residential and more commercial near the intersection with Old Kings Road South, then SR 152 climbs a bridge over the Florida East Coast Railway Main Line before intersecting with US 1 (Phillips Highway). Just after the interchange with Interstate 95 in Florida (Exit 341), the road enters the Royal Lakes neighborhood, and leaves that neighborhood after the intersection with Florida State Road 115 (Southside Boulevard). East of there SR 152 returns to more rural and residential surroundings, though after crossing under a power line right-of-way returns to more commercial surroundings as it approaches its eastern terminus at Exit 56 on Interstate 295. Shortly after its eastern terminus, Baymeadows Road turns north, and intersects Gate Parkway east of Exit 54 on I-295.

== Major intersections ==
The entire route is in Jacksonville, Duval County.

mi	km	Destinations	Notes
0.000	0.000	SR 13 (San Jose Boulevard)	
1.912	3.077	US 1 (Philips Highway / SR 5) – Jacksonville, St. Augustine, Daytona Beach	
2.780	4.474	I-95 (SR 9) – Jacksonville, Daytona Beach	I-95 exit 341
3.965	6.381	SR 115 (Southside Boulevard)	
6.290	10.123	I-295 (SR 9A)	I-295 exit 56
6.417	10.327	east end of state maintenance	
1.000 mi = 1.609 km; 1.000 km = 0.621 mi
