= Florida State Road 104 =

State highway in Florida, U.S.

State Road 104
- Dunn Avenue
- SR 104 highlighted in red

Route information
- Maintained by FDOT
- Length: 7.567 mi (12.178 km)

Major junctions
- West end: US 1 / US 23 in Jacksonville
- I-295 in Jacksonville; I-95 in Jacksonville
- East end: US 17 in Jacksonville

Location
- Country: United States
- State: Florida

Highway system
- Florida State Highway System; Interstate; US; State; Former; Pre‑1945; Toll; Scenic
← SR 103	→ SR 105

State Road 104 (SR 104), locally known as Dunn Avenue, is a 7.6-mile-long (12.2 km) state highway that travels through the northern part of Jacksonville in the northeastern part of the U.S. state of Florida. It connects US 1/US 23 with US 17.

== Route description ==
SR 104 begins at the intersection of Dunn Avenue and US 1/US 23, where SR 104 takes Dunn Avenue eastward into sparsely populated residential portions of Jacksonville. East of the interchange with Interstate 295 (I-295), development becomes more frequent, with woodlands still bordering some portions of the road. The road becomes more commercial in nature, with some woodlands on the road, starting at the intersection with SR 115 (Lem Turner Road) and continuing to head east. At Armsdale Road, SR 104 heads south, and becomes a divided road at Rutgers Road, and heads east again at Biscayne Boulevard, where at that point, the woodlands all but disappear from the road. SR 104 has an interchange with I-95, continuing east onto Busch Drive towards its eastern terminus of US 17, where former SR 163 used to continue to the east.

== Major intersections ==
The entire route is in Jacksonville, Duval County.

mi	km	Destinations	Notes
0.000	0.000	US 1 / US 23 (New Kings Road / SR 15)	Western terminus
2.42	3.89	I-295 (SR 9A) – Savannah, Daytona Beach	I-295 exit 30
4.007	6.449	SR 115 (Lem Turner Road) – Jacksonville, Callahan	
4.297	6.915	Duval Road (CR 110 east)	western terminus of CR 110
6.90	11.10	I-95 (SR 9) – Savannah, Daytona Beach	I-95 exit 360
7.567	12.178	US 17 (Main Street / SR 5) / Busch Drive – Yulee, Jacksonville	Eastern terminus; western terminus of former SR 163
1.000 mi = 1.609 km; 1.000 km = 0.621 mi

== See also ==
- List of state roads in Florida
