= Florida State Road 134 =

Highway in Florida, United States

State Road 134
- Florida State Road 134 highlighted in red

Route information
- Maintained by FDOT
- Length: 11.495 mi (18.499 km)

Major junctions
- West end: SR 228 in Jacksonville
- SR 23 in Jacksonville; I-295 in Jacksonville
- East end: US 17 in Jacksonville

Location
- Country: United States
- State: Florida

Highway system
- Florida State Highway System; Interstate; US; State; Former; Pre‑1945; Toll; Scenic
← SR 129	→ SR 136

State Road 134 (SR 134) is an 11-mile-long (18 km), east–west signed state highway located entirely in Jacksonville, Duval County, Florida, in the U.S. state of Florida. It extends from SR 228 to U.S. Route 17 (US 17). It is known as 103rd Street west of Wesconnett Boulevard and Timuquana Road east of the intersection. The road is between four and six lanes wide.

== Route description ==
SR 134 begins at an intersection with Pow-Mia Memorial Parkway at the western end of Cecil Field. It heads east on the north end of the airport until an interchange with SR 23, which is signed as exit 41. Just east of Old Middleburg Road, SR 134 crosses the Ortega River for the first time.

Just east of County Road 213 (CR 213) is an interchange with Interstate 295 (I-295; Jacksonville West Beltway), signed as exit 16 on I-295. Approximately 1.1 miles (1.8 km) east of the freeway is SR 21 (Blanding Boulevard) in Westconnett. The road crosses the Ortega River one more time before ending at U.S. Route 17 (US 17; Roosevelt Boulevard) near the St. Johns River.

== Major intersections ==
The entire route is in Jacksonville, Duval County.

mi	km	Destinations	Notes
0.000	0.000	SR 228 (Normandy Boulevard)	
0.184	0.296	POW-MIA Memorial Parkway	
0.378	0.608	Aviation Avenue - Cecil Field	
2.627	4.228	SR 23 (Branan Field Road / Chaffee Road)	FL Toll-23 exit 41
6.226	10.020	Old Middleburg Road North (CR 213 north)	
7.59	12.21	I-295 (SR 9A) – Savannah, Daytona Beach	I-295 exit 16
8.711	14.019	SR 21 (Blanding Boulevard)	
10.649– 10.914	17.138– 17.564	Bridge over Ortega River	
11.495	18.499	US 17 (Roosevelt Boulevard / SR 15) – Downtown Jacksonville, Orange Park	
1.000 mi = 1.609 km; 1.000 km = 0.621 mi
