= Florida State Road 103 =

State highway in Florida, United States

State Road 103
- Lane Avenue
- SR 103 highlighted in red

Route information
- Maintained by FDOT
- Length: 3.814 mi (6.138 km)

Major junctions
- South end: SR 208 in Jacksonville
- I-10 in Jacksonville
- North end: US 90 in Jacksonville

Location
- Country: United States
- State: Florida
- Counties: Duval

Highway system
- Florida State Highway System; Interstate; US; State; Former; Pre‑1945; Toll; Scenic
← SR 102	→ SR 104

State Road 103 (SR 103), locally known as Lane Avenue, is a state road completely in Jacksonville. It travels from SR 208 north to US 90.

== Route description ==
SR 103 begins at the intersection of Lane Avenue and Wilson Boulevard (SR 208), with SR 103 taking Lane Avenue north as a four-lane street through a mix of residential and commercial areas. The first major intersection is the western terminus of SR 128 (San Juan Avenue), and then the road curves slightly east, becoming a commercial road north of County Road 213 (Lenox Avenue). It is followed by an intersection with SR 228 (Normandy Boulevard) and an interchange with I-10. SR 103 continues north as a commercial and residential mix until it meets its northern terminus, an intersection with US 90.

== Major intersections ==
The entire route is in Jacksonville, Duval County.

mi	km	Destinations	Notes
0.000	0.000	SR 208 west (Wilson Boulevard)	Southern terminus
0.830	1.336	SR 128 east (San Juan Avenue)	Western terminus of SR 128
2.090	3.364	Lenox Avenue (CR 213)	
2.554	4.110	SR 228 (Normandy Boulevard)	
3.20	5.15	I-10 (SR 8) – Lake City, Downtown Jacksonville	I-10 exit 357
3.814	6.138	US 90 (West Beaver Street / SR 10)	Northern terminus
1.000 mi = 1.609 km; 1.000 km = 0.621 mi

== See also ==
- List of state roads in Florida
