= Roosevelt Boulevard (Jacksonville) =

- Location: Jacksonville, Florida, United States
- South end: I-295
- North end: College Street/Willow Branch Avenue

Construction
- Commissioned: 1939
- Completion: 1950

Roosevelt Boulevard is a six lane highway on the west side of Jacksonville, Florida. It takes US 17 and SR 15, from the Duval county line just south Interstate 295, until its northern end at Willow Branch Avenue, with the road itself becoming one of the incarnations of College Street in the Riverside area of Jacksonville.

== Route description ==
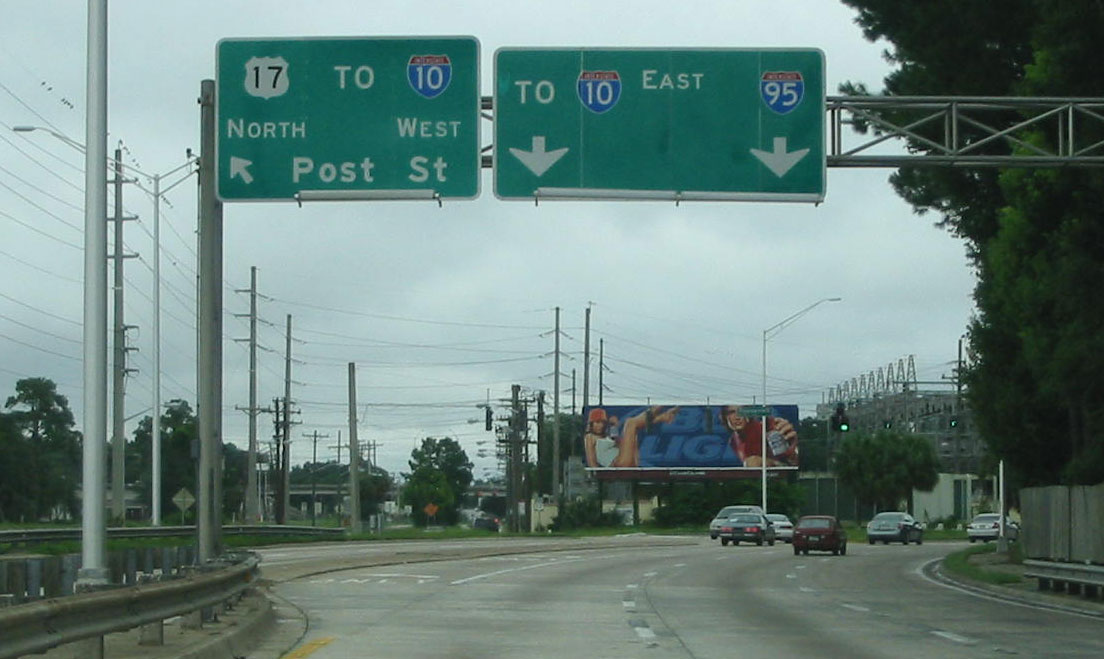
US 17 north at the interchange with the Roosevelt Expressway

Roosevelt Boulevard is one of two roads that connect Orange Park and urban Jacksonville, passing through Yukon and Venetia, Ortega, Lake Shore and Fairfax, Riverside-Avondale and Murray Hill neighborhoods along its path to central Jacksonville (Blanding Boulevard State Road 21 through Wesconnett, being the other).

Traveling north from Orange Park, Florida, in Clay County, where U.S. 17/SR 15 is known as Park Avenue, this route takes the name of Roosevelt Boulevard entering Jacksonville and Duval County, intersecting with Interstate 295 (SR 9A) just north of the Clay/Duval county line. The highway intersects east–west connector Collins Road and continues along the east edge of a railroad, the CSX A line for most of its length. Immediately north of Collins Road, the highway serves as the western border of Naval Air Station Jacksonville along the St. Johns River, with three gates, though two are rarely used. The main gate at Yorktown, features a Blue Angel at the gates. To the west of NAS Jacksonville is Fowler Park, on the shores of the Ortega River and in the Yukon section of Jacksonville.

North of NAS JAX, Roosevelt Boulevard intersects Timuquana Road, followed by Ortega Boulevard one block north. US 17 then veers northwest to bisect Ortega and border the Ortega historic district to the east. Upon crossing the Ortega River and entering the Jacksonville Marina Mile district in Lake Shore at the Roosevelt Mall, the road resumes a cardinal north direction for the next two miles, starting at the Birkenhead Road/Wabash Avenue intersection at the south end of Roosevelt Mall. After intersecting San Juan Avenue at the north end of the mall square, Roosevelt Boulevard crosses St. Johns Avenue, followed by two intersections with Park Street, with the second meeting with the Florida State College Jacksonville Kent campus. Just north of the second Park Street intersection, Roosevelt Boulevard has a diamond flyover interchange with Blanding Boulevard State Road 21 - Park Street connecting flyover at the southwestern corner of the campus. Following the interchange, Roosevelt Boulevard lines the western end of the campus for the next 1/4 mile, and the road next intersects with Plymouth Street, which also provides direct access to the campus.

North of Plymouth Street, the US 17 highway curves in a northeastern direction after rounding the FSCJ Kent campus, and just north of Wolfe Street, the Roosevelt Expressway splits off from Roosevelt Boulevard between the Murray Hill and Avondale neighborhoods, where the highway features an interchange at South Edgewood Avenue. Roosevelt Boulevard becomes Old Roosevelt Boulevard, following the rail line and intersects McDuff Avenue, sharing a concurrency for two blocks before veering back on the railroad tracks. One block east is Post Street, and finally Willowbranch Avenue at College Street in Riverside. At Post Street, US 17/Old Roosevelt splits off toward downtown Jacksonville, while US 17 southbound stretches one block north of Post Street to College Street as a southwestbound road, reflecting the previous usage of Post and College each as one-way thoroughfares through historic Riverside and 5 Points.

== History ==
Before this route was legislated in 1939, Clay County traffic into the City of Jacksonville made use of a combination of several smaller, narrower roads along the west bank of the St. Johns River.

U.S. 17 was expanded to six lanes following construction of the Roosevelt Expressway/Spur. The short four lane portion and scale of Roosevelt Boulevard remains north of the Roosevelt Expressway interchange, located near Day Avenue and north of Edgewood Avenue.

U.S. 17 is part of the Blue Star Memorial Highway, and named for President Franklin D. Roosevelt.

== Major intersections ==
The entire route is in Jacksonville, Duval County.

mi	km	Destinations	Notes
0.000	0.000	I-295 (SR 9A) – Daytona Beach, Savannah	Exit 10 on I-295, US 17 (SR 15) becomes Park Avenue south of this interchange
		Yorktown Avenue	Entrance to NAS Jacksonville
		SR 134 (Timquana Road)	
		Ortega Boulevard	
		Roosevelt Boulevard Bridge over the Ortega River	
		SR 128 (San Juan Avenue)	Roosevelt Square
		Park Street East	Florida State College at Jacksonville
		SR 21 (Blanding Boulevard)	
		Edgewood Avenue South	Diamond interchange
		US 17 north / SR 15 north (Roosevelt Expressway)	US 17 / SR 15 leave onto Roosevelt Expressway (former US Alt 17 / SR 15A)
		SR 129 / SR 228 (McDuff Avenue)	
		Post Street	Former SR 228
9.8	15.8	College Street/Willow Branch Avenue	Northern terminus
1.000 mi = 1.609 km; 1.000 km = 0.621 mi: Route transition
