= Oceanway (Jacksonville) =

Coordinates: 30°28′01″N 81°37′56″W

Oceanway is a neighborhood of Jacksonville, Florida, located in the city's Northside region. Once dotted with small farms and isolated houses, Oceanway has grown dramatically since the early 1980s, adding numerous residential neighborhoods, the first high school in the area, First Coast High School, and several other schools for lower grades. Also found near the Oceanway area is a large shopping center, River City Marketplace.

In September 2017, during Hurricane Irma, "unprecedented" flooding hit Oceanway, flooding several homes in the neighborhood.

== See also ==
- Neighborhoods of Jacksonville
