= Florida State Road 208 =

State highway in Florida, United States

State Road 208
- Wilson Boulevard
- Florida State Road 208 highlighted in red

Route information
- Maintained by FDOT
- Length: 0.840 mi (1,352 m)

Major junctions
- West end: I-295 in Jacksonville
- East end: SR 103 in Jacksonville

Location
- Country: United States
- State: Florida
- Counties: Duval

Highway system
- Florida State Highway System; Interstate; US; State; Former; Pre‑1945; Toll; Scenic
← SR 207	→ SR 210

State Road 208 (SR 208), locally known as Wilson Boulevard, is a state highway located in Jacksonville, within the northeastern part of the U.S. state of Florida. It begins at Interstate 295 (I-295) and ends at SR 103 (Lane Avenue).

== Route description ==
State Road 208 follows Wilson Boulevard through populated areas.

== Major intersections ==
The entire route is in Jacksonville, Duval County.

mi	km	Destinations	Notes
0.000	0.000	west end of state maintenance	
0.18	0.29	I-295 (SR 9A) – Savannah, St. Augustine	I-295 exit 17
0.831	1.337	SR 103 north (Lane Avenue)	Southern terminus of SR 103
0.840	1.352	east end of state maintenance	
1.000 mi = 1.609 km; 1.000 km = 0.621 mi
