= Florida State Road 129 =

State highway in Florida, United States

State Road 129
- McDuff Avenue
- Florida State Road 129 highlighted in red

Route information
- Maintained by FDOT
- Length: 0.728 mi (1,172 m)

Major junctions
- South end: US 17 / SR 228 in Jacksonville
- North end: I-10 in Jacksonville

Location
- Country: United States
- State: Florida
- Counties: Duval

Highway system
- Florida State Highway System; Interstate; US; State; Former; Pre‑1945; Toll; Scenic
← US 129	→ SR 134

State Road 129 (SR 129), also known as McDuff Avenue, is a north–south road in western Jacksonville, Florida.

== Route description ==
SR 129 begins at US 17/SR 15, intersecting with SR 228 (Post Street) one block north of the southern terminus. Ten blocks north of Post Street, it ends at an interchange with Interstate 10 (exit 360).

South of the southern terminus of SR 129, McDuff Avenue continues southward, intersecting with Remington Street, and orientates itself in a southeastern direction as a four-lane road, bordering Avondale and Riverside as it goes northwest through mostly residential streets. Three blocks north of Park Street, it meets with Robert E. Lee High School on the western side of the road. After Park Street, it continues southeast, with intersections with Herschel Street, Oak Street, Riverside Avenue, before terminating at St Johns Avenue, near the shore of the St. Johns River.

North of SR 129's northern terminus, McDuff Avenue continues north past US 90 and terminates on 5th Street and the Jacksonville Kennel Club.

== History ==
State Road 129 once had its southern terminus at Park Street but it has been truncated back to the present southern terminus of U.S. Route 17 / State Road 15. Before Jacksonville's consolidation in 1967, McDuff Avenue was County Road 21B along with Commonwealth Avenue, which the route began at Jones Road in western Duval County, going east to McDuff road before turning south on McDuff Road, terminating at St Johns Avenue. At some point between the mid-1960s and 1980s, the McDuff section was upgraded to State Road 129.

== Major intersections ==
The entire route is in Jacksonville, Duval County.

mi	km	Destinations	Notes
0.000	0.000	US 17 / SR 228 east (Roosevelt Boulevard / SR 15)	Southern terminus; southern end of SR 228 concurrency
0.136	0.219	To US 17 south / Old Roosevelt Boulevard	
0.173	0.278	SR 228 west (Post Street)	Northern end of SR 228 concurrency
0.674	1.085	I-10 east (SR 8) to I-95 / Rayford Street	I-10 exit 360
0.728	1.172	I-10 west (SR 8) / Waller Street	Northern terminus; I-10 exit 360
1.000 mi = 1.609 km; 1.000 km = 0.621 mi: Concurrency terminus
