= Florida State Road 9B =

Highway in Florida, US

State Road 9B
- SR 9B highlighted in red

Route information
- Auxiliary route of SR 9A
- Maintained by FDOT
- Length: 5.508 mi (8.864 km)
- History: Groundbreaking: 2010; Initial opening: September 19, 2013 (as Phase 1); Phase 2 opened: June 13, 2016; Phase 3 opened: August 9, 2018

Major junctions
- South end: CR 2209 in St. Johns County
- I-95 in Jacksonville; US 1 in Jacksonville
- North end: I-295 in Jacksonville

Location
- Country: United States
- State: Florida
- Counties: St. Johns, Duval

Highway system
- Florida State Highway System; Interstate; US; State; Former; Pre‑1945; Toll; Scenic
← SR 9A	→ I-10

State Road 9B (SR 9B) is a 5.5-mile-long (8.9 km) state highway on the south side of Jacksonville, Florida. It is a freeway for its entire length. Its southern terminus is at County Road 2209 (CR 2209) in St. Johns County. Its northern terminus is at the southeast-most point on Interstate 295 (I-295). The highway is planned to be redesignated as Interstate 795 (I-795) when the designation is approved by the Federal Highway Administration (FHWA) and the American Association of State Highway and Transportation Officials (AASHTO).

== Route description ==
State Road 9B begins at an interchange with Saint Johns Parkway (County Road 2209) in St. Johns, heading north as a four-lane divided highway. The road heads through Peyton Parkway (Race Track Road Connector) and Interstate 95 before expanding as a six lane expressway. The road continues north for 1.5 miles (2.4 km) where it passes over Phillips Highway (US 1). The road then continues north for another 3 miles (4.8 km) where it terminates at an interchange with Interstate 295.

== History ==
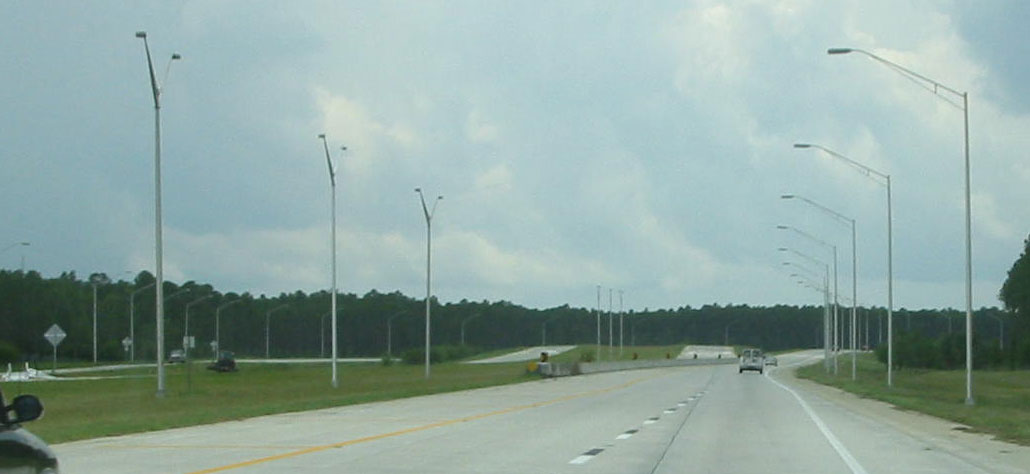
Southbound on I-295 at the future split with SR 9B in southeastern Jacksonville, July 27, 2003

SR 9A and SR 9B from I-95 near Bayard north to SR 9A were approved as future Interstate additions by the Federal Highway Administration (FHWA) in August 1986. In May 2008, the project was suspended by the Florida Department of Transportation (FDOT) but it was reinstated in 2010 when funding was acquired via stimulus funds.

=== Phase 1 ===
Phase 1 of the SR 9B/I-795 project, consisting of a three-mile (4.8 km) spur from the Eastern Beltway of I-295 to US 1, began in the middle of 2010 and was scheduled to be completed in early of 2013, at an estimated cost of $68.5 million. The winning contract went to Archer Western Contractors / GAI Consultants, who also reconstructed the I-10/I-95 interchange in downtown Jacksonville. The roadway was originally planned to open in the end of 2012, but was pushed back to 2013 to allow for the construction of a wider paved area to facilitate future expansion. In late July 2013, southbound I-295 was closed a few nights to install new overhead signs for the SR 9B interchange, one of the final construction projects of Phase 1. Phase 1 opened September 19, 2013.

=== Phase 2 ===
Superior Construction and Arcadis US was awarded a $95 million design-build contract for the second phase of SR 9B, from US 1 to I-95. Construction began in April 2013 and was fully completed on June 13, 2016. Phase 2 includes a new four-lane road between US 1 and I-95. The Phase 1 interchange at US 1 is upgraded with additional exit ramps and an overpass over US 1 and Veveras Drive in addition to utility work along US 1. A cloverstack interchange at I-95 was constructed, along with noise walls in the northwest and southeast corners.

=== Phase 3 ===
Phase 3 consisted of extending State Road 9B 2.3 miles (3.7 km) south of the Interstate 95 interchange. The third and final phase connected I-95 to County Road 2209 and Race Track Road via a connector road (named Peyton Parkway) in St. Johns County. Construction began on September 9, 2015 and opened to traffic on August 9, 2018.

== Exit list ==
Although exit numbers on SR 9B increase from north to south, this table presents interchanges from south to north to follow FDOT milepost measurements starting at St. John’s Parkway.

County	Location	mi	km	Exit	Destinations	Notes
St. Johns	St. Johns	0.000	0.000		CR 2209 (St. Johns Parkway)	Southern terminus; at-grade intersection
St. Johns	St. Johns	0.990– 1.522	1.593– 2.449	6	Race Track Road Connector (Peyton Parkway)	May connect with Nocatee Parkway long-term
Duval	Jacksonville	1.340– 1.444	2.157– 2.324	4	I-95 (SR 9) – Jacksonville, Daytona Beach	Signed as exits 4A (north) and 4B (south); I-95 exit 333
Duval	Jacksonville	2.533	4.076	3	Flagler Center Boulevard / Citicards Way / Veveras Drive	Southbound exit only
Duval	Jacksonville	2.738– 2.811	4.406– 4.524	2	US 1 (Philips Highway / SR 5) – Saint Augustine	
Duval	Jacksonville	4.915– 4.940	7.910– 7.950	1	E-Town Parkway	
Duval	Jacksonville	5.508	8.864	–	I-295 north (Jacksonville Eastern Beltway / SR 9A) – Jaxport Terminals, International Airport, Jax Beaches	Northern terminus; I-295 exit 58; no access from SR 9B to I-295 east beltway southbound or vice versa
1.000 mi = 1.609 km; 1.000 km = 0.621 mi: Incomplete access
