= Florida State Road 105 =

Highway in Florida

State Road 105
- SR 105 highlighted in red

Route information
- Maintained by FDOT
- Length: 36.818 mi (59.253 km)

Major junctions
- South end: I-95 in Jacksonville
- US 17 in Jacksonville; I-295 in Jacksonville
- North end: SR A1A in Fernandina Beach

Location
- Country: United States
- State: Florida

Highway system
- Florida State Highway System; Interstate; US; State; Former; Pre‑1945; Toll; Scenic
← SR 104	→ SR 109

State Road 105 (SR 105) is a 36.818-mile-long (59.253 km) north-south state highway in northeastern Jacksonville, Florida. It travels from an interchange with Interstate 95 (I-95) just north of downtown eastward (signed north) along the north bank of the St. Johns River to an intersection with SR A1A, at the Mayport Ferry, and then along SR A1A to the end of SR 200 in Fernandina Beach.

SR 105 is the only access road to the Jacksonville Zoo and Gardens. In fact, the entire road was named Heckscher Drive for years. However, the section from I-95 east to I-295 East Beltway was renamed Zoo Parkway.

== Route description ==
SR 105 begins at an interchange with I-95. SR 105 has an interchange with U.S. Route 17 (US 17) less than 1 mile (1.6 km) from its western terminus. From there, SR 105 can be characterized as a four-lane mid-speed highway that parallels the north bank of the St. Johns River through a rural area. After 5.9 miles (9.5 km), traffic slows down briefly to a pair of traffic lights. In between the traffic lights, there are on-ramps for access to Interstate 295 (I-295). After the traffic lights, SR 105 begins to travel through marshland along the St. Johns River. The speed limit for this portion of the road is 45 miles per hour (72 km/h). After intersecting Dave Rawls Boulevard, SR 105 thins down to a two-lane highway. The road proceeds to travel through mostly marshland, crossing over Little Clapboard Creek and Sisters Creek. After 9.3 miles (15.0 km) of travelling through marshland, SR 105 intersects SR A1A, which crosses the St. Johns River via the Mayport Ferry. At this point, signage disappears for SR 105 as it converges with SR A1A. SR 105 follows SR A1A over Fort George Inlet and through Little Talbot Island State Park and Big Talbot Island State Park. SR 105 then crosses the mouth of the Nassau River into Amelia City. SR 105 follows the beach due north until its reaches its northern terminus in Fernandina Beach.

== History ==
SR 105 travels concurrent with SR A1A from the Mayport Ferry up to Fernandina Beach, however, over the years, signage has been removed.

== Major intersections ==
County	Location	mi	km	Destinations	Notes
Duval	Jacksonville	0.000	0.000	I-95 (SR 9) / Broward Road west – Jacksonville, Daytona Beach, International Airport, Savannah	Exit 358 on I-95
Duval	Jacksonville	0.542	0.872	US 17 (Main Street / SR 5)	Trumpet interchange
Duval	Jacksonville	3.681	5.924	Bridge over Broward River	
Duval	Jacksonville	4.977	8.010	Bridge over Dunn Creek	
Duval	Jacksonville	6.034	9.711	I-295 (Jacksonville East Beltway / SR 9A) to I-95 – Jax Beaches, Daytona Beach, International Airport, Savannah	Exit 41 on I-295 (East Beltway)
Duval	Jacksonville	7.026	11.307	Bridge over San Carlos Creek	
Duval	Jacksonville	7.293	11.737	Blount Island Marine Terminal	Partial interchange with Dave Rawis Boulevard
Duval	Jacksonville	8.160	13.132	Bridge over Browns Creek	
Duval	Jacksonville	9.759	15.706	Bridge over Clapboard Creek	
Duval	Jacksonville	12.556	20.207	Service Road (SR 1051 east)	former SR 105
Duval	Jacksonville	13.112	21.102	Bridge over Sisters Creek	
Duval	Jacksonville	15.061	24.238	SR A1A south (St. Johns River Ferry)	Southern terminus of concurrency with SR A1A
Duval	Jacksonville			Bridge over Fort George River	
Nassau Sound				Nassau Sound Bridge	
Nassau	Fernandina Beach			CR 108 west (Sadler Road)	Traffic circle; eastern terminus of CR 108; former SR 108
Nassau	Fernandina Beach	36.818	59.253	SR A1A north (Atlantic Avenue / SR 200 west) – Fort Clinch State Park	Northern terminus of SR 105; eastern terminus of SR 200
1.000 mi = 1.609 km; 1.000 km = 0.621 mi: Concurrency terminus

== State Road 1051 ==
State Road 1051
- Location: Jacksonville

State Road 1051 is a service road connecting SR 105 to the Sisters Creek Marina on the approach to Sisters Creek. The road follows the former alignment of SR 105 before the Sisters Creek bridge was replaced and upgraded, which realigned SR 105 slightly to the south.

Browse numbered routes
← SR 1010	SR 1051	→ SR 1151

== See also ==
- List of state roads in Florida
