= Florida State Road 211 =

State highway in Florida, United States

State Road 211
- Florida State Road 211 highlighted in red

Route information
- Maintained by FDOT
- Length: 3.723 mi (5.992 km)
- Existed: 1945–present

Major junctions
- South end: SR 128 in Jacksonville
- North end: Peninsular Place in Jacksonville

Location
- Country: United States
- State: Florida
- Counties: Duval

Highway system
- Florida State Highway System; Interstate; US; State; Former; Pre‑1945; Toll; Scenic
← SR 208	→ SR 212

State Road 211 (SR 211) is a state highway entirely within Jacksonville, Florida, running from San Juan Avenue (SR 128), north to Peninsular Place (just north of the Fuller Warren Bridge).

== Route description ==
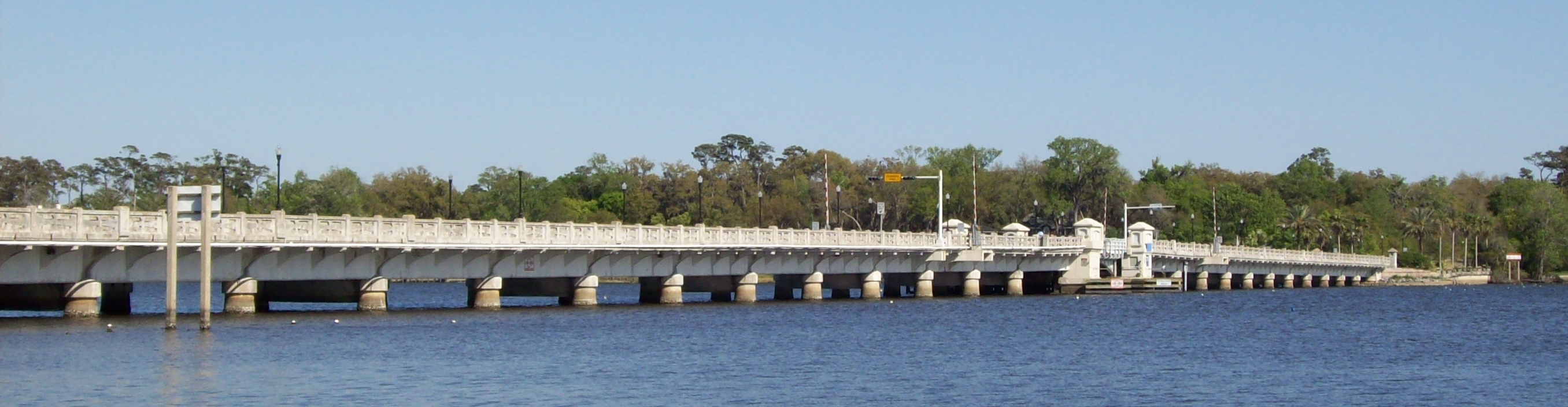
Ortega River Drawbridge on Grand Avenue east end/San Juan Avenue west end

State Road 211 begins the intersection of Herschel Street and San Juan Avenue (SR 128), with SR 211 heading north on Herschel Street, with commercial presence on the street, with residential housing not far from the road. After a short crossing of a canal, the road turns east, becoming St. Johns Avenue and once again, paralleling the St. Johns River as SR 211 enters Avondale, a residential district. After curving in direction for a few blocks, St. Johns Avenue gains a parallel street, Riverside Avenue, one block northeast of St. Johns Avenue, with SR 211 representing a mix of residential and commercial areas as it heads northeast. At the western end of the St. Vincents Medical Center, SR 211 turns north on King Street for one block, which at one point represented the city limits of Jacksonville. SR 211 then turns east on Riverside Avenue, which paralleled St. Johns Avenue for 19 blocks to the southwest, into the Riverside area, continuing the mix of commercial and residential presence on SR 211. After a few blocks, it turns north, with intersections with Post Street, the historical northern terminus of SR 211, and I-95 two blocks north, in which access is provided a few blocks north on Park Street. SR 211 goes under I-95, entering central Jacksonville, and ends at Peninsular Place.

== History ==
From 1932 to 1950, the road was the original route in south Jacksonville of US 17, before Roosevelt Avenue (now Roosevelt Boulevard) was built. Between 1951 - 1955, the route was signed "US Alt 17", with a hidden State Road 211. By 1957, the US Alt 17 was removed and it was only signed as State Road 211. The portion between Post Street north to the Acosta Bridge was added to SR 211 in 1994.

== Major intersections ==
The entire route is in Jacksonville, Duval County.

mi	km	Destinations	Notes
0.000	0.000	SR 128 west (San Juan Avenue)	south end of state maintenance (except for isolated Ortega River Bridge)
3.503	5.638	To I-95 south / Post Street	former US 17 south / SR 228 west
3.723	5.992	Peninsular Place	north end of state maintenance
1.000 mi = 1.609 km; 1.000 km = 0.621 mi
