= Interstate 295 (Florida) =

Interstate Highway in Florida, United States

Interstate 295
- I-295 highlighted in red

Route information
- Auxiliary route of I-95
- Maintained by FDOT
- Length: 61.04 mi (98.23 km)
- Existed: 1970–present
- NHS: Entire route

Major junctions
- Beltway around Jacksonville
- US 17; I-10; US 1 / US 23; I-95; US 90; SR 202; Future I-795 / SR 9B

Location
- Country: United States
- State: Florida
- Counties: Duval

Highway system
- Interstate Highway System; Main; Auxiliary; Suffixed; Business; Future; Florida State Highway System; Interstate; US; State; Former; Pre‑1945; Toll; Scenic
← SR 294	→ SR 295
← SR 9	SR 9A	→ SR 9B

Interstate 295 (I-295), an auxiliary route of I-95, is a beltway around central Jacksonville, Florida, United States. The 61.04-mile-long (98.23 km) beltway consists of two segments, the West Beltway (formerly signed as simply I-295) and the East Beltway (formerly signed as State Road 9A [SR 9A]), with I-95 serving as the dividing line between the two. The entire highway carries a hidden designation as SR 9A by the Florida Department of Transportation (FDOT). The West Beltway was constructed in the 1970s, with the East Beltway being built from the 1980s to the 2000s.

== Route description ==
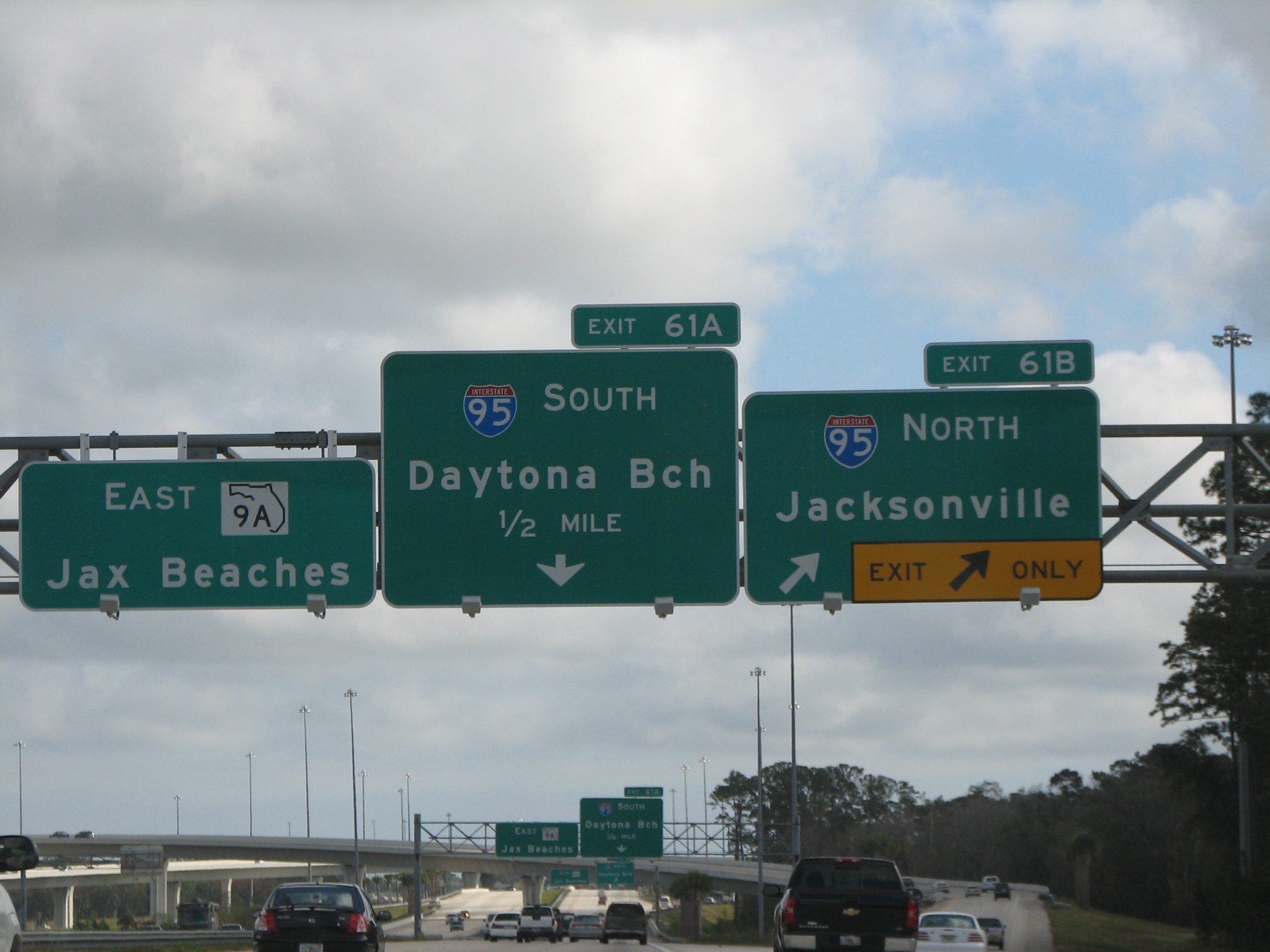
Exit signs at the interchange with I-95, on south I-295; in this picture from 2008, the East Beltway was signed as SR 9A.

Beginning at the I-95 interchange in southeastern Duval as the West Beltway, the beltway travels west, passes through the Mandarin area with interchanges at Old St. Augustine Road, and SR 13 (San Jose Boulevard). It then travels along the three-mile-long (4.8 km) Buckman Bridge crossing the St. Johns River immediately south of Naval Air Station Jacksonville (NASJAX) and serves as a major connection in the southern part of Jacksonville. At the western end of the river, I-295 continues west, serving as the border between Clay and Duval counties running just north of the town of Orange Park with interchanges at US Route 17 (US 17)/SR 15 (Roosevelt Boulevard) and SR 21 (Blanding Boulevard), serving NASJAX and Clay County. Before turning north through the Westside of Duval County, the freeway also has a full interchange at east–west connector Collins Road to serve the Argyle and Oak Leaf areas in addition to NASJAX. Continuing north, with full interchanges at SR 134 (103rd Street), SR 208 (Wilson Boulevard), and SR 228 (Normandy Boulevard), I-295, the west half of Jacksonville's Beltway reaches its interchange with I-10 approximately six miles (9.7 km) west of Downtown, then crosses over US 90 (Beaver Street), a railroad, and a creek, and then continues into Northern Duval.

North of the I-10 interchange, the western beltway loops around the northwest side of Jacksonville with full interchanges located at both Commonwealth Avenue and Pritchard Road, before curving northeast to an interchange at US 1/US 23 (New Kings Road). The road then crosses the Trout River before crossing SR 104 (Dunn Avenue), where this northern portion of the loop turns east, with interchanges at SR 115 (Lem Turner Road), SR 243 (International Airport Boulevard)/Duval Road, and I-95, all just south of Jacksonville International Airport, where the East Beltway begins.

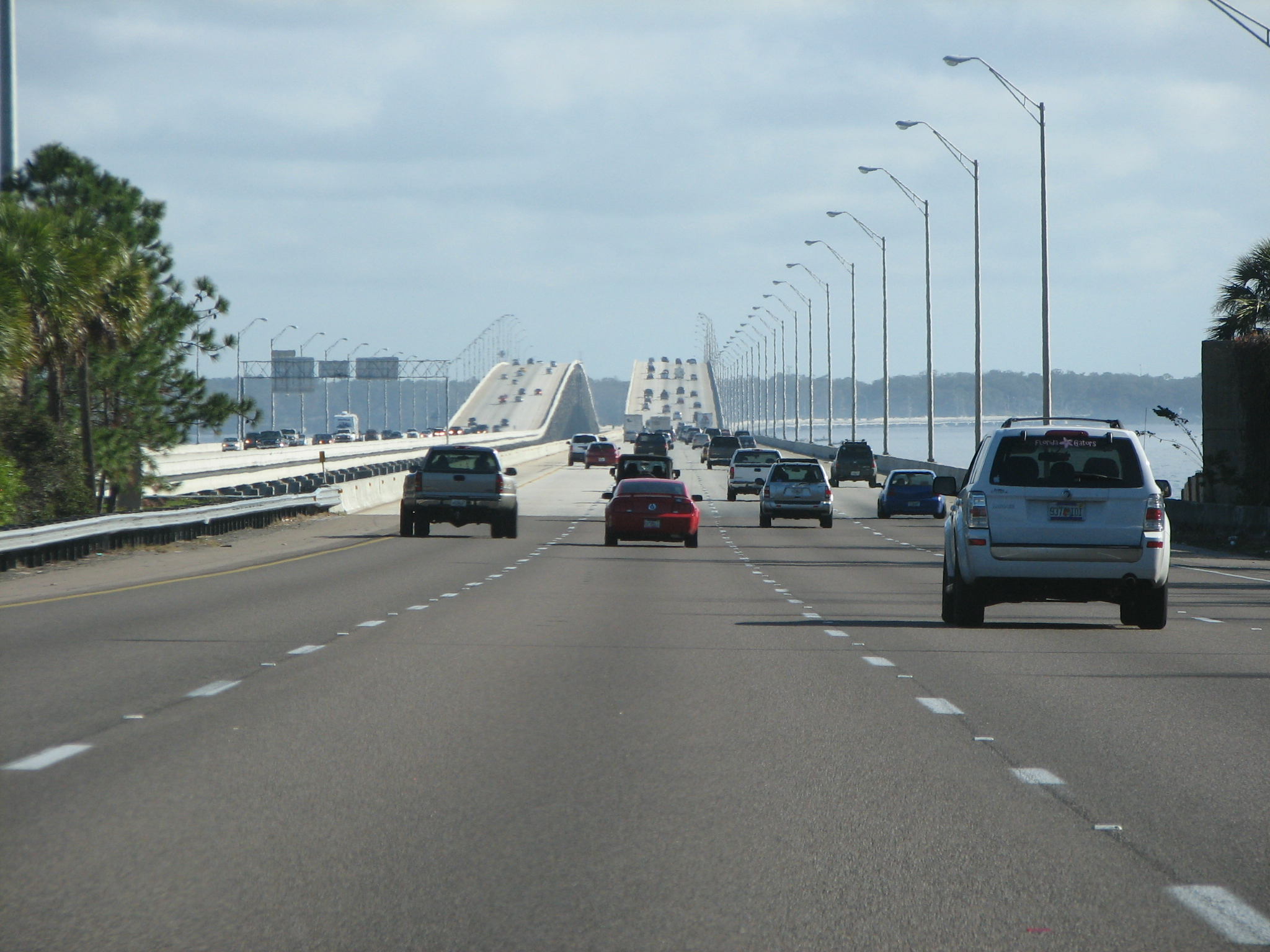
I-295 at the Buckman Bridge

East of the I-95 interchange near the airport, I-295 continues east as the East Beltway, with the next interchange being US 17 (North Main Street). I-295 starts to curve to the southeast, with interchanges at Pulaski Road and Alta Drive/Yellowbluff Road. Before orienting itself southward at the SR 105 (Zoo Parkway/Heckscher Drive) area, the freeway crosses the Dames Point Bridge over the St. Johns River into the Fort Caroline area. Just south of the bridge, a partial interchange with SR 113 (Southside Connector) in the Regency area is followed by full interchanges with Merrill and Monument roads, providing access through Arlington between Jacksonville University and Naval Station Mayport. Continuing south, it has full interchanges with SR 10 (Atlantic Boulevard), St. Johns Bluff Road, US 90/SR 212 (Beach Boulevard) and Town Center Parkway/University of North Florida Drive access to the University of North Florida. The next interchange, SR 202 (J. Turner Butler Boulevard), is a freeway to freeway turbine interchange, finished in 2008. After interchanges with Gate Parkway and SR 152 (Baymeadows Road) and a partial interchange with SR 9B (future I-795), I-295 curves to the west, it crosses US 1 (Philips Highway) before completing the loop at I-95 in south Jacksonville.

The northern part of the I-295 loop, from Commonwealth Avenue just north of I-10 in the west to Beach Boulevard (US 90) in the east consists of two general purpose lanes in each direction (with the exception of the Dames Point bridge which contains three lanes in each direction). The southern part of the loop consists of three general purpose lanes (except for the Buckman bridge which contains four lanes in each direction), plus two express toll lanes in each direction between I-95 and the Buckman bridge as well as between J. Turner Butler Boulevard (SR 202) and I-795/SR 9B. The Blanding Boulevard/Collins Road interchange complex also includes a collector–distributor system.

== History ==
The current version of I-295 appeared on maps in 1967, as a loop around central Jacksonville, with the first section between I-95 in south Duval County to SR 134 (exit 16) in 1970, and the section from SR 134 to I-10 opened in 1973. The section from I-10 to Commonwealth Avenue (exit 22) opened in 1975, followed by the extension to I-95 in north Jacksonville in 1977, completing the western section of the loop.

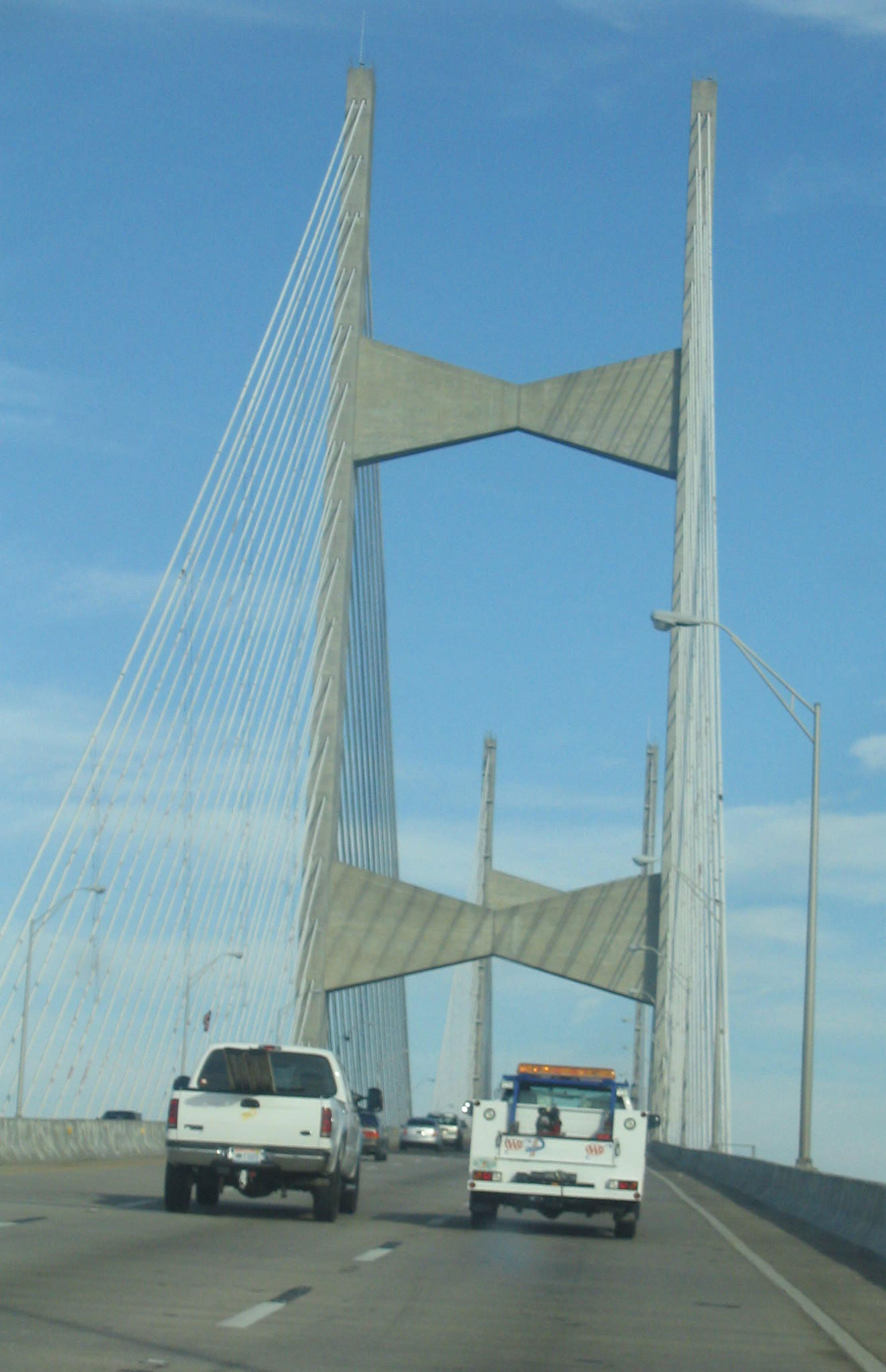
I-295 northbound at the Dames Point Bridge

The eastern section, formerly signed as SR 9A, had its first section open from I-95 in north Jacksonville to US 17 (exit 36) in 1983. The eastern half of the loop was constructed initially as a super-two highway with traffic lights in the late 1980s and was not up to Interstate Highway standards. The Dames Point Bridge was signed as I-295 in 1990, but this designation was removed in 1993 and replaced by SR 9A. The final sections of SR 9A were completed in 2006, creating a complete loop around central Jacksonville. Several sections not under Interstate compliance were upgraded, and the route was considered interstate ready in 2009.

The I-295 East Beltway (formerly signed as SR 9A) was designated the Ronald Reagan Memorial Highway in an FDOT ceremony on August 27, 2009. After the Federal Highway Administration accepted the road as the eastern loop of I-295 in 2010, the state was no longer able to name the highway.

Improvements to the I-95 interchange north close by the airport were under construction, new lanes and a flyover ramp were constructed to help improve the interchange. This was completed in late September 2010.

On December 4, 2011, the two halves of the Jacksonville beltway changed over to their current designations: the West Beltway (formerly the whole of I-295) and the East Beltway (formerly SR 9A). The East Beltway was officially given the I-295 designation, making the entire beltway I-295, and SR 9A remained the hidden designation for the entire beltway for FDOT purposes.

In February 2011, construction began for a new interchange at Collins Road, just west of the congested Blanding Boulevard exit. The $63.4-million (equivalent to $86.3 million in 2025) project was completed in December 2013, earlier than the originally projected 2014 date.

On May 18, 2019, two express toll lanes in each direction stretching from the Buckman Bridge near exit 5 at San Jose Boulevard (SR 13) to I-95 (exit 61) at the southern end of Jacksonville opened after several years of construction.

On April 9, 2022, two express lanes in each direction stretching from I-795/SR 9B (exit 58) to J. Turner Butler Boulevard (SR 202, exit 53) at the southeastern end of Jacksonville opened to traffic.

Beginning in November 2016, FDOT undertook a $176.8 million design-build reconstruction of the I-95/I-295 North Interchange near Jacksonville International Airport, replacing left-side exit ramps between the two interstates with high-speed flyovers.

=== Interstate 795 (SR 9B) ===
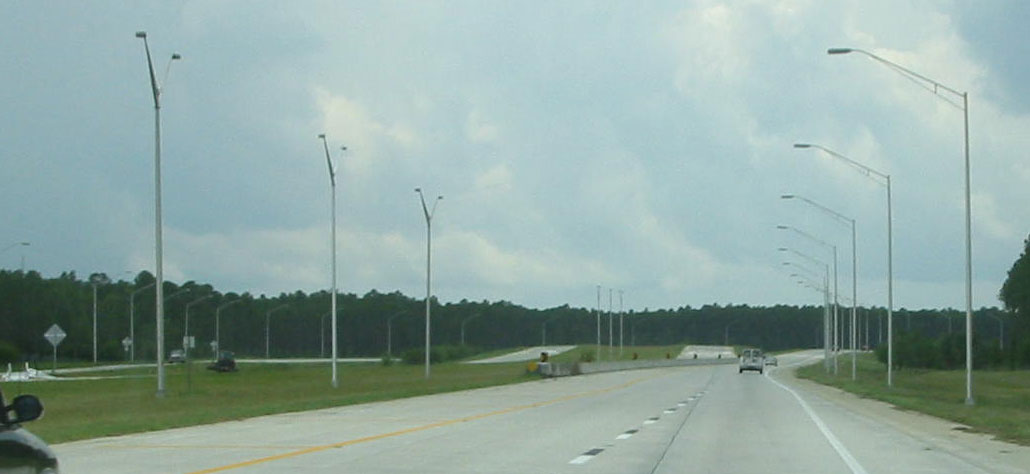
Southbound on I-295 East Beltway at the then-unfinished interchange with SR 9B in southeastern Jacksonville

Extending from the southeast corner of the loop is I-795, currently signed as SR 9B, an approximately 5.5-mile (8.9 km) expressway connecting to I-95 and proceeding southward into St. Johns County. In May 2008, the SR 9B project was originally suspended by FDOT. The project was reinstated in 2009, and construction of Phase 1 began in June 2010 and opened on September 19, 2013. Construction of Phase 2, which extends SR 9B from US 1 to I-95, started in May 2013 and opened on June 13, 2016. Construction of Phase 3 extending south of I-95 to County Road 2209 (CR 2209) and Race Track Road via a connector road in St. Johns County began on September 8, 2015, and completed on August 8, 2018. I-795 signage along the route has yet to occur.

=== 1992 attacks ===
In 1992, a series of sniper shootings and concrete block- and brick-throwing attacks occurred on the West Beltway. Of the 36 confirmed attacks, "5 [were] shootings from moving vehicles, 15 shootings from overpasses or the side of the road, 15 cases in which concrete, bricks or rocks were thrown at vehicles and 1 instance in which shooting and concrete-throwing were combined". At least one motorist, William Klinedinst, died after a concrete block landed on the hood of his moving car, causing it to crash; his body was not identified for several weeks. Another motorist, Debra Lewis, received a bullet wound to the face, and several other injuries occurred. The incidents spurred Governor Lawton Chiles to dispatch the Florida National Guard to patrol the roadway and the American Automobile Association (AAA) to issue a rare travel warning for the Interstate and direct its customers to avoid its use. A taskforce was set up by the Jacksonville Sheriff's Office to investigate the incidents, and, though charges were filed, they were eventually dropped. The taskforce was disbanded at the end of 1992, and the incidents remained unsolved to this day.

== Future ==
As of 2022, FDOT is conducting a study on widening the section between the Dames Point Bridge and J. Turner Butler Boulevard (SR 202).

== Exit list ==
The entire route is in Jacksonville, Duval County.

mi	km	Old exit	New exit	Destinations	Notes
60.864 0.000	97.951 0.000	—	61	I-95 – Daytona Beach, Jacksonville	Southern terminus of West Beltway, southern terminus of East Beltway; signed as exits 61A (south) and 61B (north); I-95 exit 337
60.864 0.000	97.951 0.000	—	61	Begin West Beltway	
0.5	0.80		—	I-295 Express north (Express Lanes)	SunPass toll lanes; clockwise exit and counterclockwise entrance; no access from I-95
1.6	2.6		—	I-295 Express north (Express Lane)	SunPass toll lane; clockwise exit only; provides access for vehicles entering the West Beltway from I-95
2.888	4.648	1	3	Old St. Augustine Road	Single point urban interchange
4.689	7.546	2	5	SR 13 (San Jose Boulevard)	Signed as exits 5A (north) and 5B (south) clockwise; provides access to HCA Florida Mandarin Emergency
			—	I-295 Express south (Express Lanes)	SunPass toll lanes; counterclockwise exit and clockwise entrance
5.505– 8.596	8.859– 13.834	Buckman Bridge over the St. Johns River			
9.416	15.154	3	10	US 17 (Roosevelt Boulevard north / Park Avenue south) – Orange Park, NAS Jax	Provides access to Naval Hospital Jacksonville
11.522	18.543	4	12	SR 21 (Blanding Boulevard) / Collins Road – Orange Park Mall	Collins Road interchange opened December 2013; provides access to HCA Florida Orange Park Hospital
15.738	25.328	5	16	SR 134 (103rd Street)	
17.260	27.777	6	17	SR 208 (Wilson Boulevard)	
19.224	30.938	7	19	SR 228 (Normandy Boulevard)	
20.434	32.885	8	21	I-10 – Jacksonville, Lake City	Signed as exits 21A (east) and 21B (west); I-10 exit 356
22.018	35.435	9	22	Commonwealth Avenue	
24.524	39.468	10	25	Pritchard Road	
27.481	44.226	11	28	US 1 / US 23 (New Kings Road) – Callahan	Signed as exits 28A (south) and 28B (north)
29.816	47.984	12	30	SR 104 (Dunn Avenue)	
31.466	50.640	13A	32	SR 115 (Lem Turner Road)	
33.127	53.313	13C	33	International Airport Boulevard (SR 243 north) / Duval Road (CR 110 south) – Jacksonville International Airport	
34.884	56.140	14	35	I-95 – Jacksonville, International Airport, Savannah	Northern terminus of West Beltway, northern terminus of East Beltway; I-95 exit 362
34.884	56.140	14	35	End West Beltway, begin East Beltway	
35.705	57.462		36	US 17 (Main Street)	
37.252	59.951		37	Pulaski Road	
39.531	63.619		40	Alta Drive	
41.302	66.469		41	SR 105 (Zoo Parkway / Heckscher Drive) – Jaxport Terminals, Jacksonville Zoo	
42.665– 44.677	68.663– 71.901	Dames Point Bridge over the St. Johns River			
45.170	72.694		45	SR 113 south (Southside Connector south) / Merrill Road east to SR 116	Clockwise exit and counterclockwise entrance; northern terminus of SR 113 (Southside Connector)
45.588	73.367		46	Merrill Road west – Jacksonville University	Counterclockwise entrance via exit 45
46.727	75.200		47	CR 99 (Monument Road) – Naval Station Mayport, Regency Square Mall, Timucuan Preserve, Fort Caroline Nat'l Memorial	
48.183	77.543		48	SR 10 (Atlantic Boulevard)	Single point urban interchange
48.749	78.454		49	St. Johns Bluff Road	Counterclockwise exit and clockwise entrance
50.777	81.718		51	US 90 (Beach Boulevard) – Florida State College South Campus, Jacksonville's Beaches	Single point urban interchange
52.053	83.771		52	University of North Florida Drive / Town Center Parkway	Single point urban interchange to the University of North Florida and St. Johns Town Center
			—	I-295 Express south (Express Lanes)	SunPass toll lanes; clockwise exit and counterclockwise entrance
53.157	85.548		53	SR 202 (Butler Boulevard) to I-95 – Jax Beaches, Jacksonville	Turbine interchange; signed as exits 53A (east) and 53B (west) counterclockwise
54.336	87.445		54	Gate Parkway	
55.719	89.671		56	SR 152 (Baymeadows Road)	
57.653	92.784		58	SR 9B south to US 1 / I-95 – St. Augustine	Clockwise exit and counterclockwise entrance; includes access from Express Lanes; future I-795 south
			—	I-295 Express north (Express Lanes)	SunPass toll lanes; counterclockwise exit and clockwise entrance
60.038	96.622		60	US 1 (Philips Highway)	
60.864 0.000	97.951 0.000	—	61	I-95 – Daytona Beach, Jacksonville	Southern terminus of East Beltway, southern terminus of West Beltway; signed as exits 61A (south) and 61B (north); I-95 exit 337
60.864 0.000	97.951 0.000	—	61	End East Beltway	
1.000 mi = 1.609 km; 1.000 km = 0.621 mi: Electronic toll collection; Incomplete access; Route transition
