= Duval County, Florida =

County in Florida, United States

Duval County
- Consolidated city-county
- City of Jacksonville and Duval County
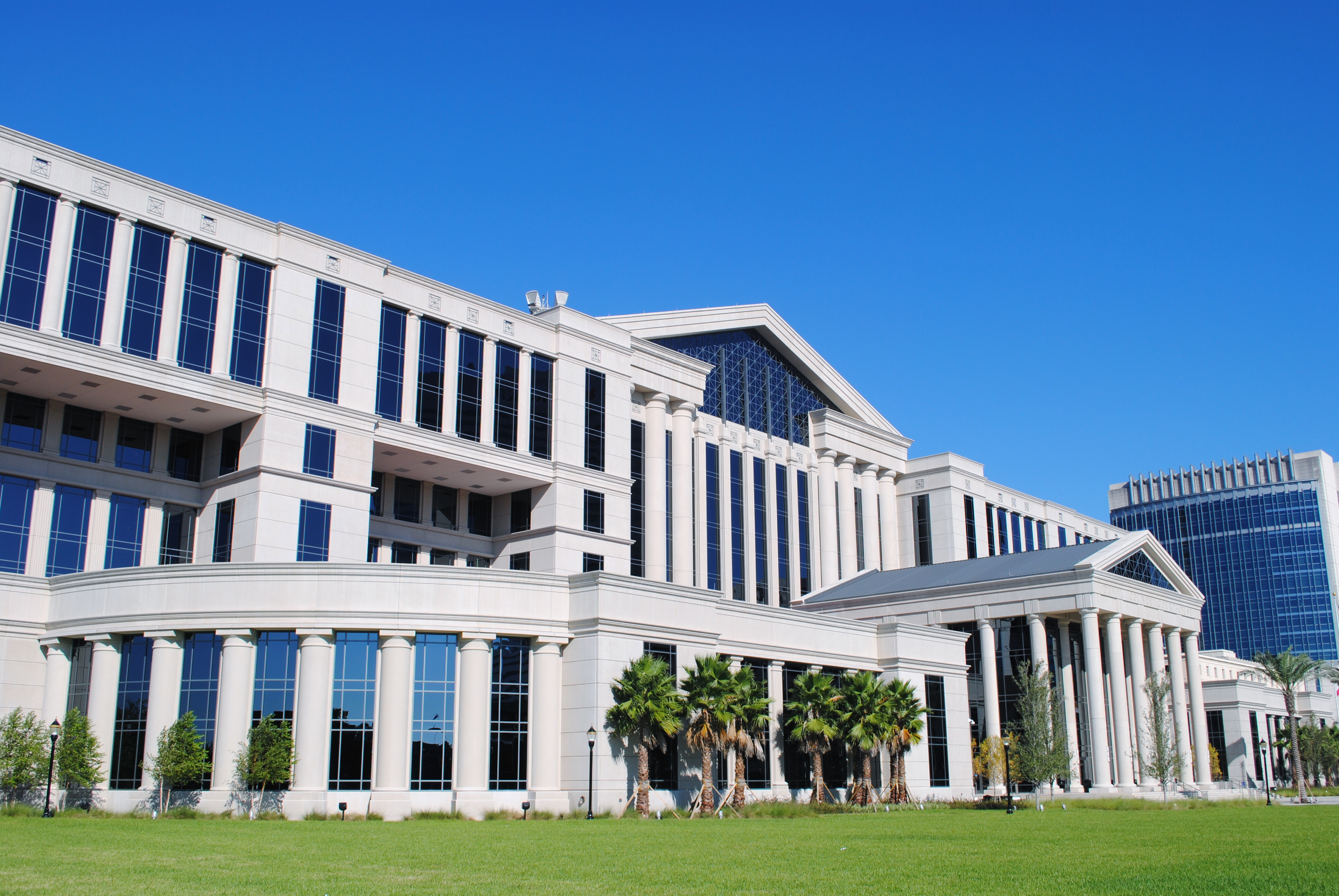
- Duval County Courthouse

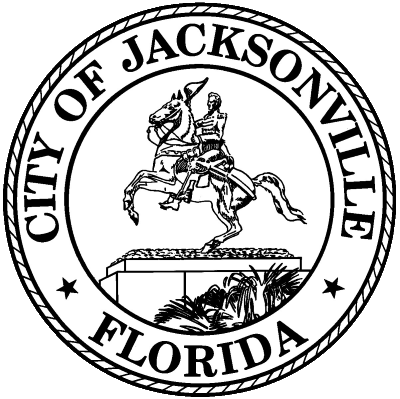
- Flag Seal

- Location within the U.S. state of Florida
- Coordinates: 30°20′6.882″N 81°38′53.206″W
- Country: United States
- State: Florida
- Founded: August 12, 1822
- Consolidated: October 1, 1968
- Named for: William Pope Duval
- Seat: Jacksonville
- Largest city: Jacksonville

Government
  - Mayor: Donna Deegan (D); Councilmembers Members: Ken Amaro (R); Mike Gay (R); Will Lahnen (R); Kevin Carrico (R); Joseph Carlucci (R); Michael Boyland (R); Jimmy Peluso (D); Reginald Gaffney Jr. (D); Tyrona Clark-Murray (D); Ju'Coby Pittman (D); Raul Arias (R); Randy White (R); Rory Diamond (R); Rahman Johnson (D); Moné Holder (D); Ron Salem (R); Nicholas Howland (R); Matt Carlucci (R); Chris Miller (R)

Area
  - Total: 918.464 sq mi (2,378.81 km^{2})
  - Land: 762.623 sq mi (1,975.18 km^{2})
  - Water: 155.841 sq mi (403.63 km^{2}) 17.0%

Population (2020)
  - Total: 995,567
  - Estimate (2025): 1,062,963 ▲
  - Density: 1,305.45/sq mi (504.037/km^{2})
- Time zone: UTC−5 (Eastern)
  - Summer (DST): UTC−4 (EDT)
- Area code: 904 and 324
- Congressional districts: 4th, 5th
- Website: jacksonville.gov
- GDP Total $98.043 billion (2023)

Duval County (/djuːˈvɔːl/ dew-VAWL), officially the City of Jacksonville and Duval County, is a county in the northeastern part of the U.S. state of Florida. As of the 2020 census, its population was 995,567, making it the sixth-most populous county in Florida. Its county seat is Jacksonville, with which the Duval County government has been consolidated since 1968. Duval County was established in 1822 and is named for William Pope Duval, Governor of Florida Territory from 1822 to 1834. Duval County is the central county of the Jacksonville, Florida Metropolitan Statistical Area.

== History ==
The area was settled by varying cultures of indigenous peoples for thousands of years before European contact. Within the Timucuan Ecological and Historic Preserve in Jacksonville, archeologists excavated remains of some of the oldest pottery in the United States, dating to 2500 BCE. Prior to European contact, the area was inhabited by the Mocama, a Timucuan-speaking group who lived throughout the coastal areas of northern Florida. At the time Europeans arrived, much of what is now Duval County was controlled by the Saturiwa, one of the region's most powerful tribes. The area that became Duval County was home to the 16th-century French colony of Fort Caroline and saw increased European settlement in the 18th century with the establishment of Cowford, later renamed Jacksonville.

Duval County was created in 1822 from St. Johns County. It was named for William Pope Duval, Governor of Florida Territory from 1822 to 1834. When Duval County was created, it covered a massive area, from the Suwannee River on the west to the Atlantic Ocean on the east, north of a line from the mouth of the Suwannee River to Jacksonville on the St. Johns River. Alachua and Nassau counties were created out of parts of Duval County in 1824. Clay County was created from part of Duval County in 1858. Part of St. Johns County south and east of the lower reaches of the St. Johns River was transferred to Duval County in the 1840s.

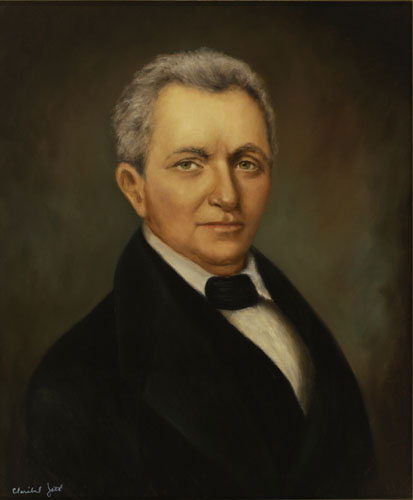
Portrait of William Pope Duval

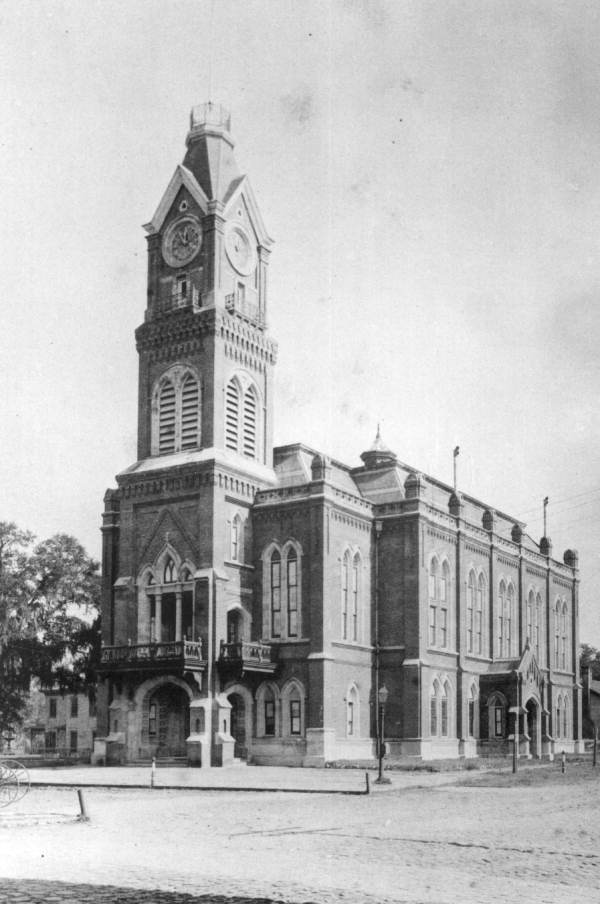
Duval County Courthouse in 1894

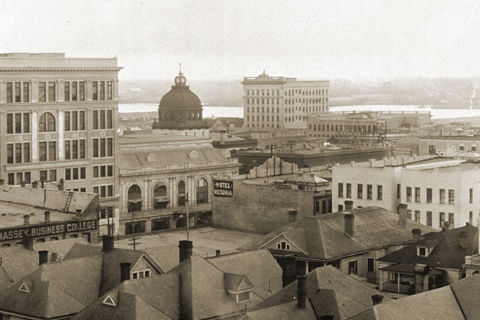
Jacksonville in 1909

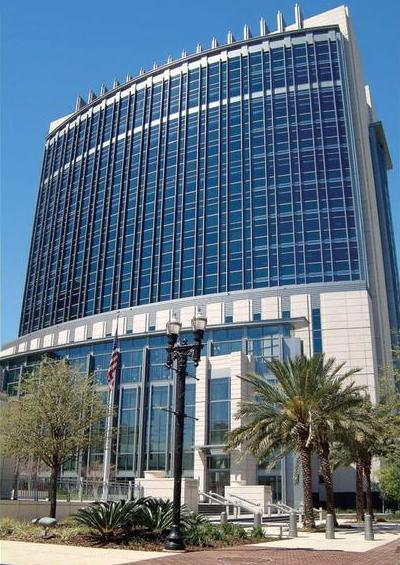
Bryan Simpson United States Courthouse in 2008.

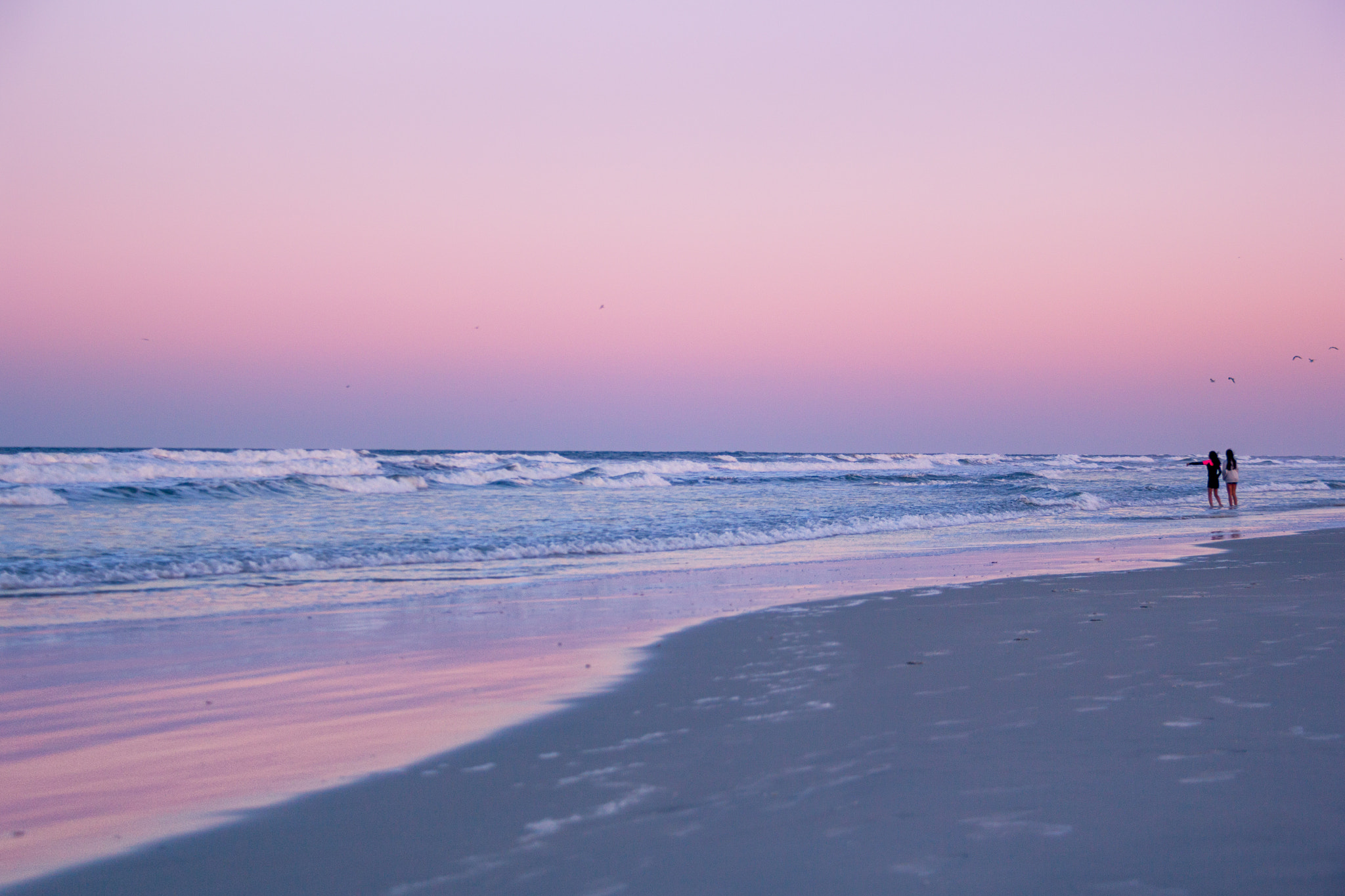
Jacksonville Beach in 2018.

== Government ==
On October 1, 1968, the government of Duval County was consolidated with the government of the city of Jacksonville. The Duval County cities of Atlantic Beach, Jacksonville Beach, and Neptune Beach, and the town of Baldwin are not included in the corporate limits of Jacksonville and maintain their own municipal governments. The city of Jacksonville provides all services that a county government would normally provide. The Mayor of Jacksonville serves as the chief administrator over all of Duval County.

== Geography ==
According to the United States Census Bureau, the county has a total area of 918.464 square miles (2,378.81 km^{2}), of which 762.623 square miles (1,975.18 km^{2}) is land and 155.841 square miles (403.63 km^{2}) (17.0%) is water. The topography is coastal plain; however there are some rolling hills.

=== National protected areas ===
- Fort Caroline National Memorial
- Timucuan Ecological and Historic Preserve

=== Adjacent counties ===
- Nassau County – north and northwest
- St. Johns County – southeast
- Clay County – southwest
- Baker County – west

== Demographics ==
Historical population
Census	Pop.	Note	%±
1830	1,970		—
1840	4,156		111.0%
1850	4,539		9.2%
1860	5,074		11.8%
1870	11,921		134.9%
1880	19,431		63.0%
1890	26,800		37.9%
1900	39,733		48.3%
1910	75,163		89.2%
1920	113,540		51.1%
1930	155,503		37.0%
1940	210,143		35.1%
1950	304,029		44.7%
1960	455,411		49.8%
1970	528,865		16.1%
1980	571,003		8.0%
1990	672,971		17.9%
2000	778,879		15.7%
2010	864,263		11.0%
2020	995,567		15.2%
2025 (est.)	1,062,963	▲	6.8%
U.S. Decennial Census; 1790–1960 1900–1990; 1990–2000 2010–2020

As of the first quarter of 2024, the median home value in Duval County was $367,550.

According to the U.S. Census Bureau's July 2024 estimates, Duval County had a population of approximately 1,055,159.

As of the 2023 American Community Survey, there are 428,020 estimated households in Duval County with an average of 2.36 persons per household. The county has a median household income of $69,436. Approximately 14.6% of the county's population lives at or below the poverty line. Duval County has an estimated 63.3% employment rate, with 34.3% of the population holding a bachelor's degree or higher and 91.6% holding a high school diploma.

=== Racial and ethnic composition ===
Note: the US Census treats Hispanic/Latino as an ethnic category. This table excludes Latinos from the racial categories and assigns them to a separate category. Hispanics/Latinos may be of any race.

Race / ethnicity (NH = non-Hispanic)	Pop. 1980	Pop. 1990	Pop. 2000	Pop. 2010	Pop. 2020
White alone (NH)	413,897 (72.49%)	478,981 (71.17%)	494,747 (63.52%)	488,826 (56.56%)	492,039 (49.42%)
Black or African American alone (NH)	139,039 (24.35%)	162,420 (24.13%)	214,473 (27.54%)	250,063 (28.93%)	286,344 (28.76%)
Native American or Alaska Native alone (NH)	1,259 (0.22%)	1,779 (0.26%)	2,375 (0.30%)	2,816 (0.33%)	2,306 (0.23%)
Asian alone (NH)	5,921 (1.04%)	12,123 (1.80%)	20,871 (2.68%)	35,381 (4.09%)	48,652 (4.89%)
Pacific Islander alone (NH)	—	—	431 (0.06%)	688 (0.08%)	960 (0.10%)
Other race alone (NH)	405 (0.07%)	335 (0.05%)	1,407 (0.18%)	2,006; 0.23(%)	6,837 (0.69%)
Mixed race or multiracial (NH)	—	—	12,629 (1.62%)	19,085 (2.21%)	45,740 (4.59%)
Hispanic or Latino (any race)	10,482 (1.84%)	17,333 (2.58%)	31,946 (4.10%)	65,398 (7.57%)	112,689 (11.32%)
Total	571,003 (100.00%)	672,971 (100.00%)	778,879 (100.00%)	864,263 (100.00%)	995,567 (100.00%)

A map of racial demographics in Duval County, Florida by Census tract Legend: Non-Hispanic White 30–40% 40–50% 50–60% 60–70% 70–80% 80–90% >90% Black or African American 30–40% 40–50% 50–60% 60–70% 70–80% 80–90% >90% Asian 30–40%

=== 2020 census ===
As of the 2020 census, the county had a population of 995,567, with 399,759 households and 249,480 families residing in the county. The population density was 1,305.4 inhabitants per square mile (504.0/km^{2}). The median age was 37.7 years, 21.5% of residents were under the age of 18, and 15.3% of residents were 65 years of age or older. For every 100 females there were 93.7 males, and for every 100 females age 18 and over there were 90.9 males age 18 and over.

The racial makeup of the county was 51.7% White, 29.4% Black or African American, 0.4% American Indian and Alaska Native, 5.0% Asian, 0.1% Native Hawaiian and Pacific Islander, 4.5% from some other race, and 9.0% from two or more races. Hispanic or Latino residents of any race comprised 11.3% of the population.

97.3% of residents lived in urban areas, while 2.7% lived in rural areas.

Of the 399,759 households in the county, 28.9% had children under the age of 18 living in them. Of all households, 39.9% were married-couple households, 20.5% were households with a male householder and no spouse or partner present, and 32.0% were households with a female householder and no spouse or partner present. About 29.5% of all households were made up of individuals and 9.9% had someone living alone who was 65 years of age or older.

There were 435,033 housing units at an average density of 570.4 per square mile (220.2/km^{2}), of which 8.1% were vacant. Among occupied housing units, 56.5% were owner-occupied and 43.5% were renter-occupied. The homeowner vacancy rate was 1.8% and the rental vacancy rate was 9.0%.

=== 2010 census ===
As of the 2010 census, there were 864,263 people, 342,450 households, and 218,254 families residing in the county. The population density was 1,133.9 inhabitants per square mile (437.8/km^{2}). There were 388,486 housing units at an average density of 509.7 per square mile (196.8/km^{2}). The racial makeup of the county was 60.87% White, 29.51% African American, 0.39% Native American, 4.15% Asian, 0.09% Pacific Islander, 2.13% from some other races and 2.85% from two or more races. Hispanic or Latino people of any race were 7.57% of the population.

Ancestries:

- White (10.7% German, 10.6% Irish, 9.2% English, 4.1% Italian, 2.3% French, 2.1% Scottish, 2.1% Scotch-Irish, 1.8% Polish, 1.2% Dutch, 0.6% Russian, 0.6% Swedish, 0.6% Norwegian, 0.5% Welsh, 0.5% French Canadian)
- Black (1.7% Subsaharan African, 1.4% West Indian/Afro-Caribbean American [0.5% Haitian, 0.4% Jamaican, 0.1% Other or Unspecified West Indian, 0.1% Bahamian])
- Native
- Asian (1.7% Filipino, 0.8% Indian, 0.6% Other Asian, 0.4% Vietnamese, 0.3% Chinese, 0.2% Korean, 0.1% Japanese)
- Other Races (0.9% Arab)
- Multiracial
- Hispanic/Latino (2.5% Puerto Rican, 1.7% Mexican, 0.8% Cuban)

In 2010, 6.7% of the population considered themselves to be of only "American" ancestry (regardless of race or ethnicity).

Of the 342,450 households 28.68% had children under the age of 18 living with them, 41.92% were married couples living together, 16.74% had a female householder with no husband present, and 36.27% were non-families. 24.85% of households were one person and 8.05% (2.29% male and 5.76% female) had someone living alone who was 65 or older. The average household size was 2.47 and the average family size was 3.04.

The age distribution was 23.5% under the age of 18, 10.5% from 18 to 24, 28.4% from 25 to 44, 26.4% from 45 to 64, and 11.1% 65 or older. The median age was 35.8 years. For every 100 females there were 94.3 males. For every 100 females age 18 and over, there were 91.6 males.

The median household income was $49,463 and the median family income was $60,114. Males had a median income of $42,752 versus $34,512 for females. The per capita income for the county was $25,854. About 10.4% of families and 14.2% of the population were below the poverty line, including 20.3% of those under age 18 and 9.6% of those aged 65 or over.

In 2010, 9.0% of the county's population was foreign born, with 49.5% being naturalized American citizens. Of foreign-born residents, 38.2% were born in Latin America, 35.6% born in Asia, 17.9% were born in Europe, 5.8% born in Africa, 2.0% in North America, and 0.5% were born in Oceania.

=== 2000 census ===
As of the 2000 census, there were 778,879 people, 303,747 households, and 201,688 families residing in the county. The population density was 1,007.0 inhabitants per square mile (388.8/km^{2}). There were 329,778 housing units at an average density of 426.0 per square mile (164.5/km^{2}). The racial makeup of the county was 65.80% White, 27.83% African American, 0.33% Native American, 2.71% Asian, 0.06% Pacific Islander, 1.31% from some other races and 1.96% from two or more races. Hispanic or Latino people of any race were 4.10% of the population.

There were 303,747 households out of which 33.30% had children under the age of 18 living with them, 46.50% were married couples living together, 15.60% had a female householder with no husband present, and 33.60% were non-families. 26.50% of all households were made up of individuals and 7.80% had someone living alone who was 65 years of age or older. The average household size was 2.51 and the average family size was 3.06.

In the county the population was spread out with 26.30% under the age of 18, 9.60% from 18 to 24, 32.40% from 25 to 44, 21.20% from 45 to 64, and 10.50% who were 65 years of age or older. The median age was 34 years. For every 100 females there were 94.20 males. For every 100 females age 18 and over, there were 90.90 males.

The median income for a household in the county was $40,703, and the median income for a family was $47,689. Males had a median income of $32,954 versus $26,015 for females. The per capita income for the county was $20,753. About 9.20% of families and 11.90% of the population were below the poverty line, including 16.40% of those under age 18 and 11.60% of those age 65 or over.

=== Languages ===
As of 2010, 87.36% of all residents spoke English as their first language, while 5.74% spoke Spanish, 1.18% Tagalog, 0.53% Arabic, 0.48% Serbo-Croatian, 0.47% Vietnamese, and 0.46% of the population spoke French Creole (mostly Haitian Creole) as their mother language. In total, 12.64% of the population spoke languages other than English as their primary language.

== Politics ==
=== Voter registration ===
According to the Secretary of State's office, Democrats comprise a plurality of registered voters in Duval County.

Duval County Voter Registration & Party Enrollment as of April 30, 2025
Political party	Total voters	Percentage
Democratic	249,544	37.97%
Republican	239,335	36.42%
Independent/No Party Affiliation	147,071	22.38%
Third parties	21,195	3.23%
Total	657,145	100.00%

=== Statewide and national elections ===
Duval County is somewhat conservative for an urban county, and it began moving away from the Democratic Party sooner than the majority of Florida counties. Despite the small Democratic plurality in registration, the county's Democrats are nowhere near as liberal as their counterparts in other large Florida counties, such as Broward and Orange. The county has only supported a Democrat for president three times since 1952, in 1960, 1976, and 2020.

However, the Republican edge in Duval has lessened somewhat in recent years. It swung from a 16-point win for George W. Bush in 2004 to only a three-point win for John McCain in 2008. Mitt Romney won an equally narrow margin in 2012 and in 2016, Donald Trump only won the county by fewer than 6,000 votes even as he narrowly carried Florida. In 2020, Joe Biden, despite losing statewide, broke the 44-year Democratic drought in Duval County, winning by less than four points. In 2024, the county reverted to the GOP and Trump won it by less than 2 points.

In 2018, Andrew Gillum, despite losing the election, won Duval by four points, the first time a Democrat had won the county in a gubernatorial election since Steve Pajcic's losing bid in 1986. Four years later, however, Duval rebounded to vote for Ron DeSantis by over 10 points. In the Senate elections, Bill Nelson only failed to carry the county in his first bid in 2000, and Lawton Chiles and Bob Graham carried the county in all three of their respective bids. In 2022, Marco Rubio won the county in his reelection bid by 9 points.

United States presidential election results for Duval County, Florida
Year	Republican		Democratic		Third party(ies)	
Year	No.	%	No.	%	No.	%
1892	0	0.00%	1,442	95.18%	73	4.82%
1896	1,462	39.58%	1,903	51.52%	329	8.91%
1900	773	27.73%	1,857	66.61%	158	5.67%
1904	671	21.91%	2,011	65.65%	381	12.44%
1908	641	18.00%	2,381	66.84%	540	15.16%
1912	243	5.20%	3,514	75.26%	912	19.53%
1916	1,339	16.83%	5,456	68.57%	1,162	14.60%
1920	6,628	31.18%	13,650	64.21%	979	4.61%
1924	3,291	28.93%	5,908	51.93%	2,177	19.14%
1928	16,919	63.39%	9,316	34.91%	454	1.70%
1932	6,096	24.25%	19,038	75.75%	0	0.00%
1936	5,368	17.12%	25,989	82.88%	0	0.00%
1940	9,177	18.29%	41,003	81.71%	0	0.00%
1944	12,220	24.89%	36,867	75.11%	0	0.00%
1948	15,379	25.76%	28,567	47.85%	15,749	26.38%
1952	50,346	48.27%	53,949	51.73%	0	0.00%
1956	53,481	50.17%	53,127	49.83%	0	0.00%
1960	59,073	45.73%	70,091	54.27%	0	0.00%
1964	81,116	50.55%	79,365	49.45%	0	0.00%
1968	51,585	30.89%	54,834	32.84%	60,559	36.27%
1972	122,154	72.19%	46,530	27.50%	520	0.31%
1976	74,997	41.08%	105,912	58.01%	1,652	0.90%
1980	98,664	50.45%	90,466	46.26%	6,424	3.29%
1984	128,724	62.41%	77,488	37.57%	37	0.02%
1988	128,081	62.79%	74,894	36.72%	1,004	0.49%
1992	123,631	49.47%	92,098	36.85%	34,197	13.68%
1996	126,959	49.96%	112,328	44.20%	14,836	5.84%
2000	152,460	57.49%	108,039	40.74%	4,682	1.77%
2004	220,190	57.78%	158,610	41.62%	2,261	0.59%
2008	210,537	50.53%	202,618	48.63%	3,538	0.85%
2012	211,615	51.27%	196,737	47.67%	4,381	1.06%
2016	211,672	48.48%	205,704	47.12%	19,197	4.40%
2020	233,762	47.30%	252,556	51.11%	7,843	1.59%
2024	236,285	50.14%	229,365	48.67%	5,632	1.20%

United States Senate election results for Duval County, Florida1
Year	Republican		Democratic		Third party(ies)	
Year	No.	%	No.	%	No.	%
2024	232,168	50.07%	223,191	48.13%	8,324	1.80%

United States Senate election results for Duval County, Florida3
Year	Republican		Democratic		Third party(ies)	
Year	No.	%	No.	%	No.	%
2022	177,401	53.95%	147,646	44.90%	3,794	1.15%

Florida Gubernatorial election results for Duval County
Year	Republican		Democratic		Third party(ies)	
Year	No.	%	No.	%	No.	%
1994	108,900	57.22%	80,945	42.53%	471	0.25%
1998	111,716	60.15%	74,016	39.85%	4	0.00%
2002	148,923	61.35%	92,263	38.01%	1,556	0.64%
2006	132,607	58.86%	87,718	38.93%	4,972	2.21%
2010	135,074	51.60%	120,097	45.88%	6,614	2.53%
2014	146,407	54.22%	112,026	41.49%	11,600	4.30%
2018	179,869	47.35%	196,537	51.74%	3,431	0.90%
2022	182,569	55.44%	143,837	43.68%	2,913	0.88%

== Education ==
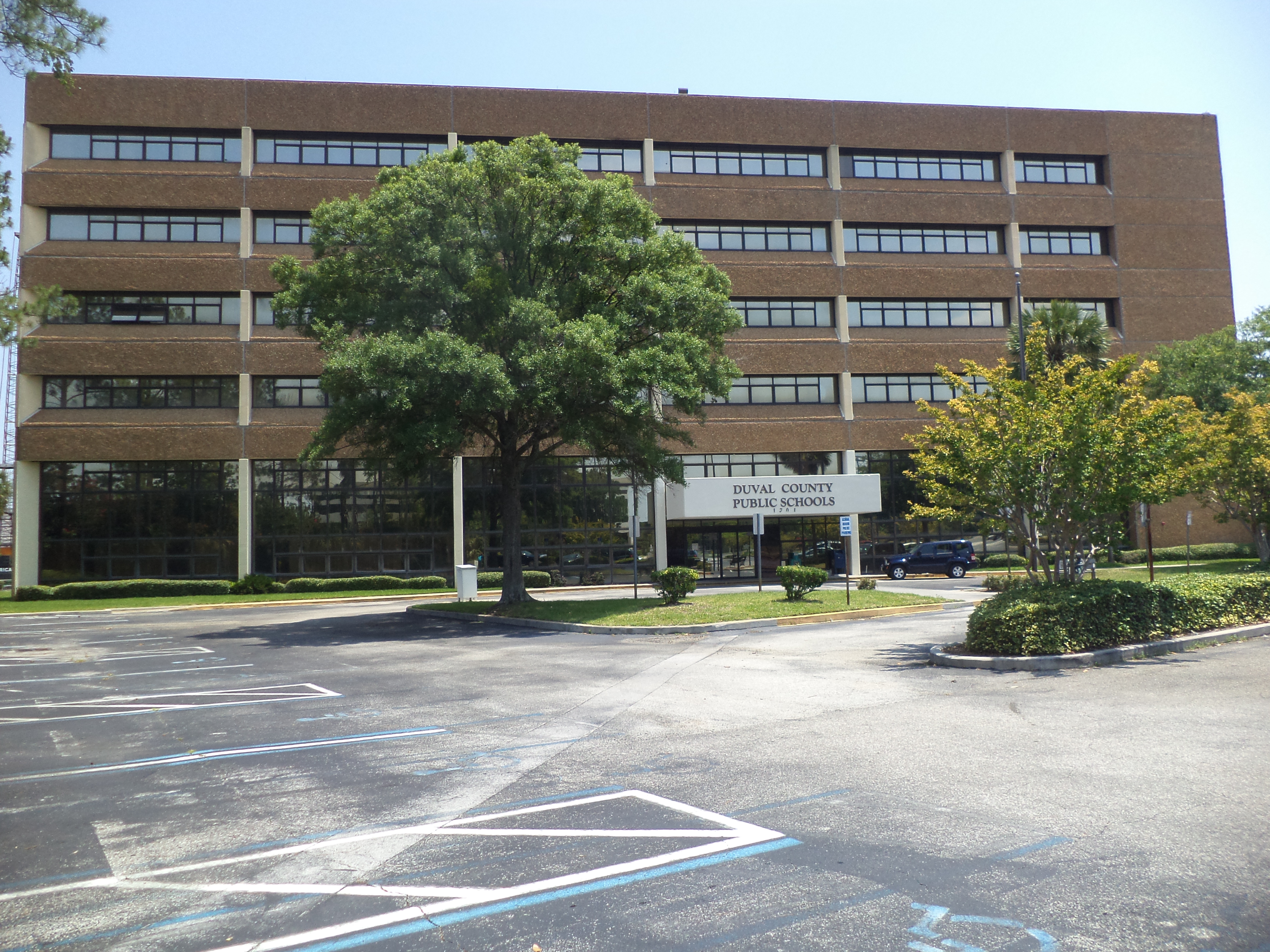
Duval County Public Schools headquarters

Duval County Public Schools operates public schools in all areas of the county.

Duval County is served by the Jacksonville Public Library.

== Communities ==
Rank	Municipality	Type	2023 Estimate	2020 Census	Change
1	Jacksonville	City	985,843	949,611	+3.82%
2	Jacksonville Beach	City	23,447	23,830	−1.61%
3	Atlantic Beach	City	13,182	13,513	−2.45%
4	Neptune Beach	City	6,984	7,217	−3.23%
5	Baldwin	Town	1,366	1,396	−2.15%

== Transportation ==
=== Public transportation ===
Public transportation is provided by the Jacksonville Transportation Authority.

=== Major highways ===
- I-10 / SR 8
- I-95 / SR 9
- I-295 / SR 9A
- US 1 / SR 5
- US 1 Alt.
- US 17 / SR 15
- US 23 / SR 139
- US 90
- US 90 Alt.
- US 301 / SR 200
- SR A1A
- SR 9B
- SR 10

=== Airports ===
- Cecil Airport
- Herlong Recreational Airport
- Jacksonville Executive at Craig Airport
- Jacksonville International Airport

== See also ==
- National Register of Historic Places listings in Duval County, Florida
- List of tallest buildings in Jacksonville
