= Arlington (Jacksonville) =

Arlington Greater Arlington
- Region
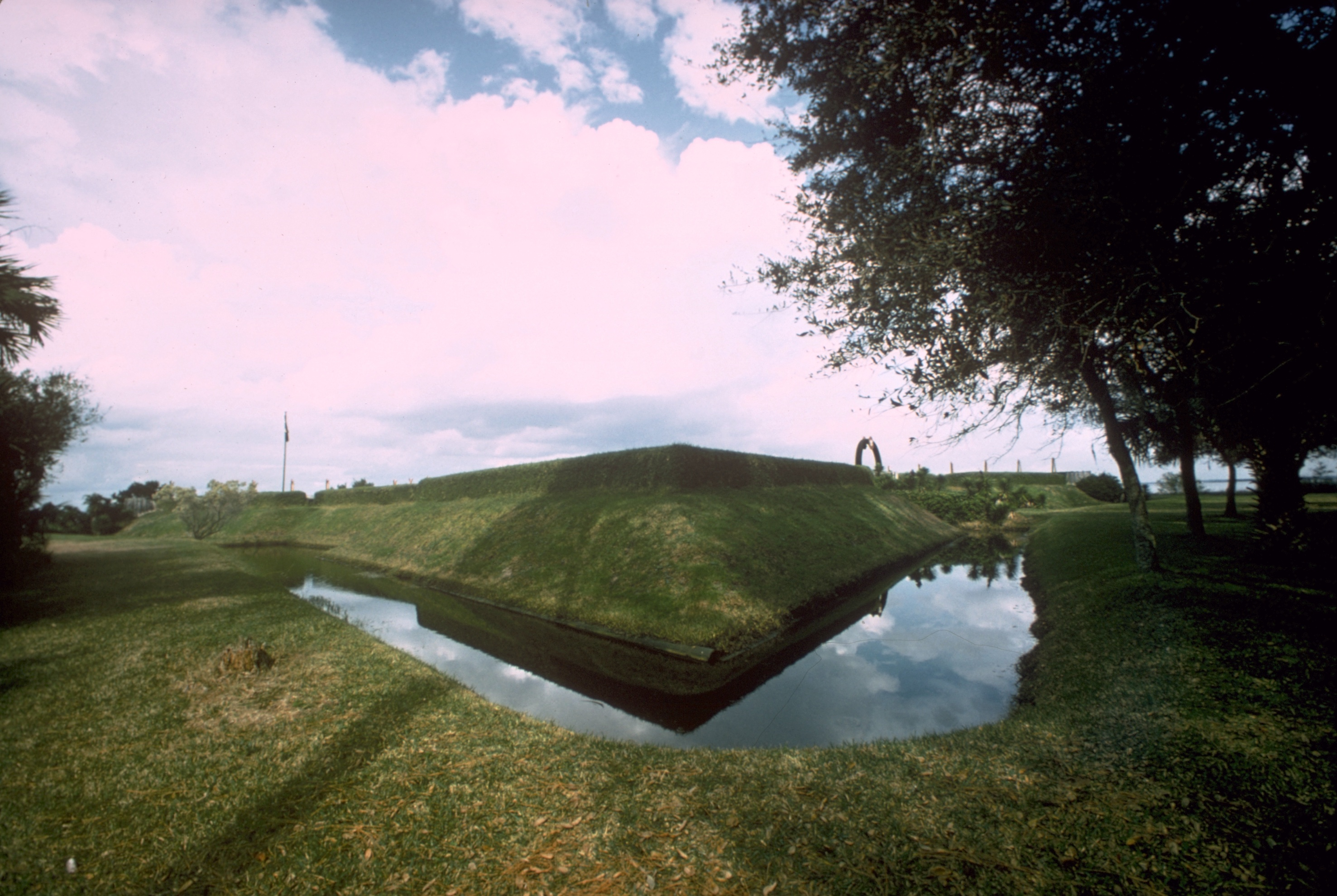
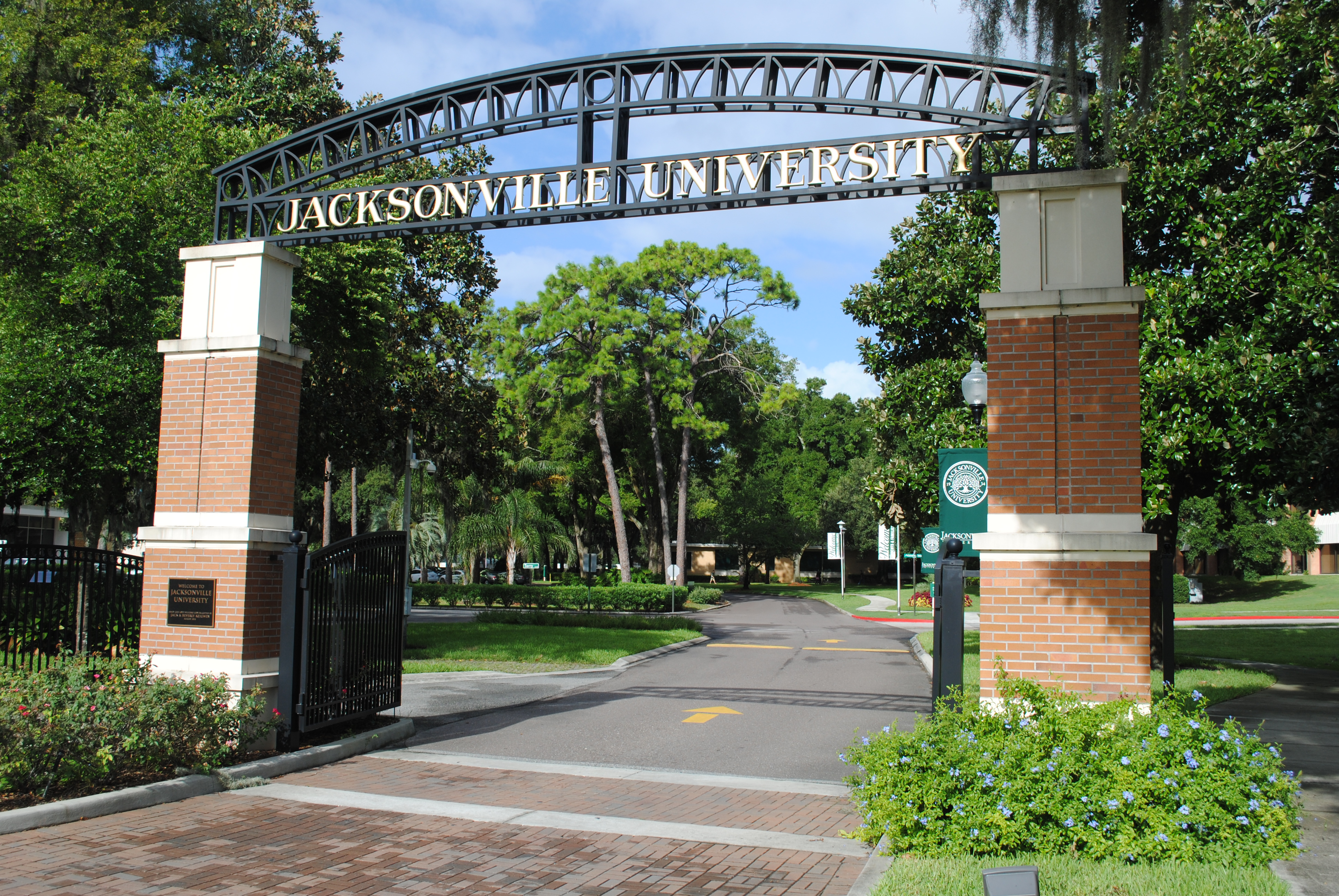
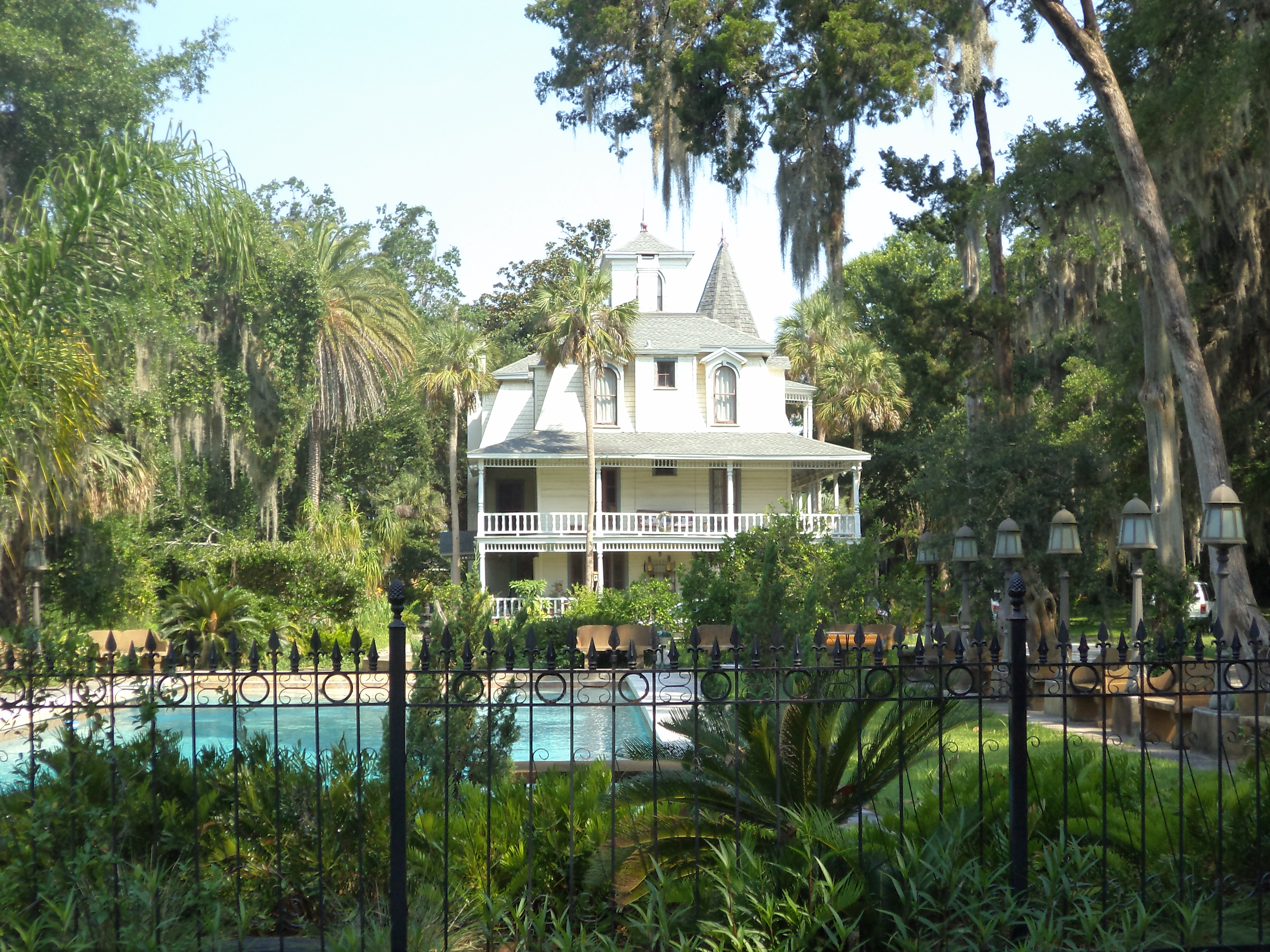
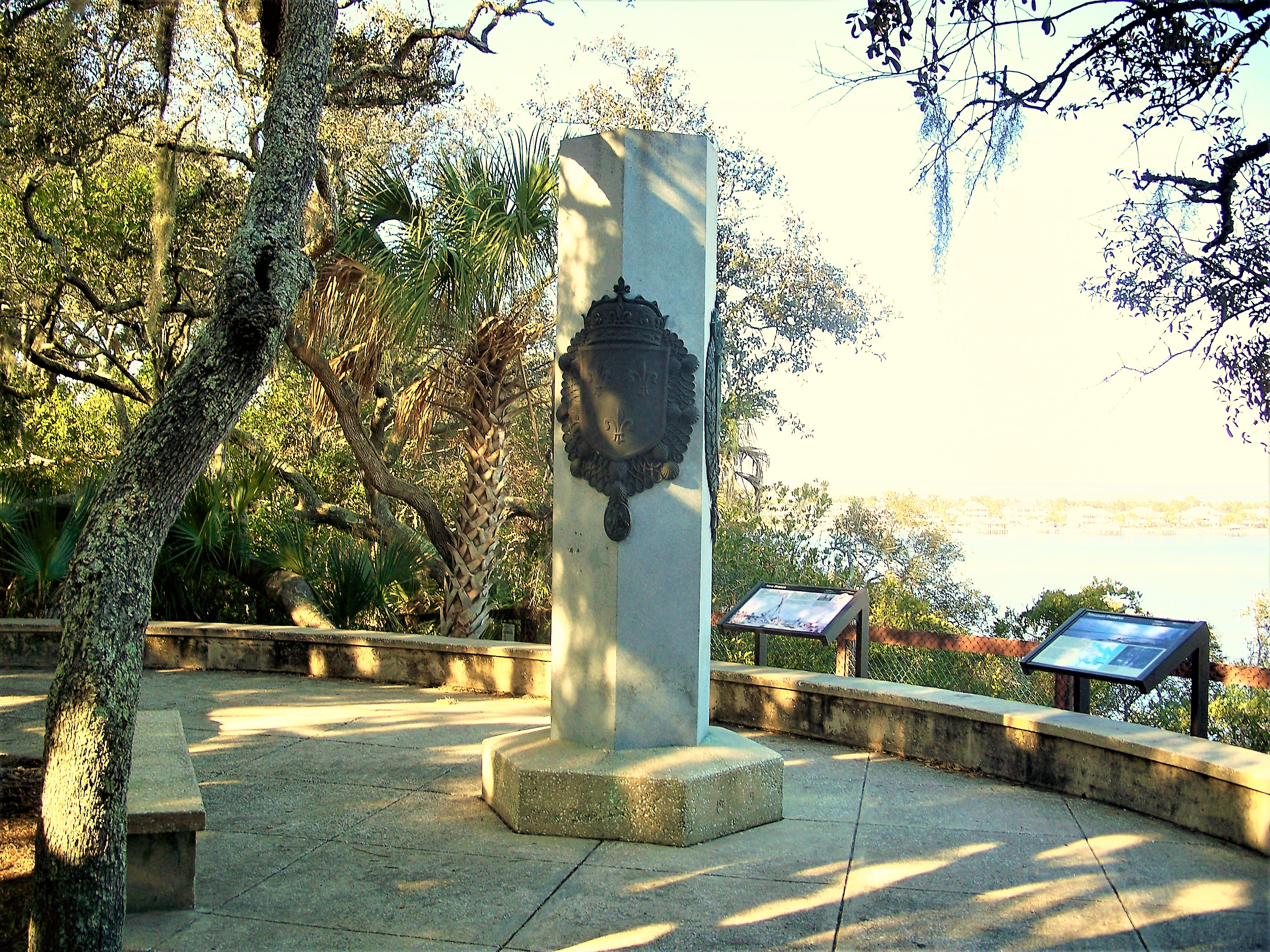
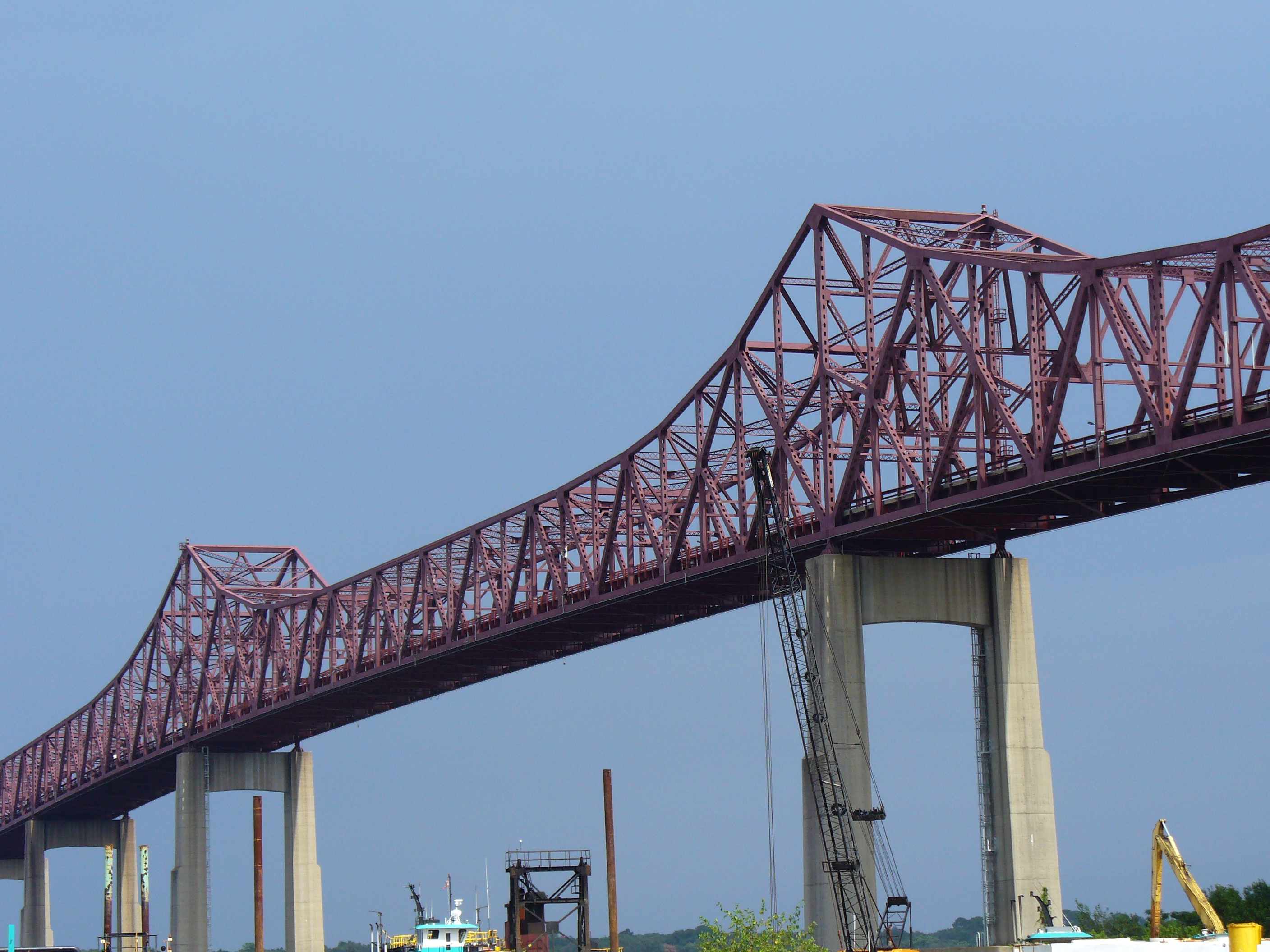
- from the left, Fort Caroline, Jacksonville University, Marabanong mansion, Ribault Monument and the Mathews Bridge.

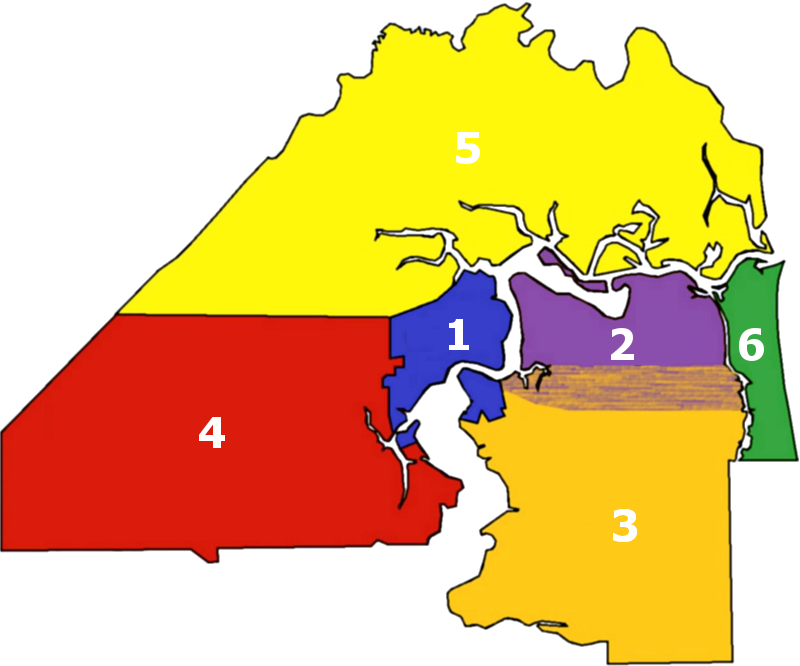
- Vernacular regions of Jacksonville: 1. Urban core; 2. Arlington; 3. Southside; 4. Westside; 5. Northside; 6. Beaches
- Coordinates: 30.321205°N 81.551487°W
- Country: United States
- State: Florida
- City: Jacksonville

Government
  - Florida House: Reggie Fullwood; Charles McBurney
  - Florida Senate: Aaron Bean; Audrey Gibson
  - U.S. House: John Rutherford (R)

Area
  - Land: 64.307 sq mi (166.55 km^{2})

Population (2013)
  - Total: 120,593
  - Density: 1,875/sq mi (724/km^{2})
- ZIP Code: 32277, 32211, 32225
- Area code(s): 904, 324

Arlington is a large region of Jacksonville, Florida, and is generally understood as a counterpart to the city's other large regions, the Urban Core, Northside, Southside, Westside, and the Beaches. It borders the Southside area at its southern end, and has several bridge connections to nearby beaches, the Northside and Downtown. The expansive neighborhood was incorporated into the city in 1968 as a result the Jacksonville Consolidation, a city-county consolidation of the governments of the City of Jacksonville and Duval County. Arlington is known for its mid-century modern architecture, and contains several architecturally significant homes designed by local architects Robert C. Broward, Taylor Hardwick, and William Morgan.

== History ==
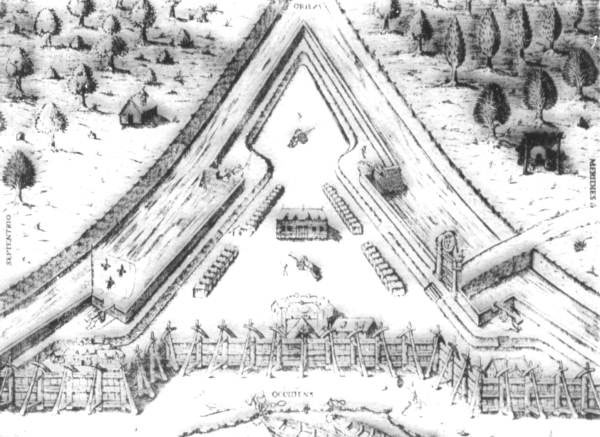
Fort Caroline depicted in an old etching

Arlington was one of the first areas in the United States visited by Europeans; it was the site of the French Fort Caroline in 1564–1565, now represented by the Fort Caroline National Memorial. After the destruction of Fort Caroline, the area was only sparsely inhabited until the 19th century, when sawmills and plantations were established along the St. Johns River. After the American Civil War these gave way to residential developments, which were gradually absorbed into the Arlington community as it grew.

Completed in 1910, Atlantic Boulevard was Florida's first modern "improved" highway and is considered to have been the beginning of the state's highway system. The highway connects the mainland portion of the city of Jacksonville with the Jacksonville Beaches. Its western terminus is in the San Marco neighborhood; running through Arlington and on to the Atlantic Ocean at the Jacksonville Beaches. First proposed in the 1890s by Eugene F. Gilbert, who personally paid for land surveys and eventually convinced the Duval County Commission to use convict labor to start building the road. A new set of county commissioners would eventually terminate the project as it neared completion. The road was eventually completed after the arrival of the automobile. Originally only 18 feet (5.5 m) wide, the road would soon draw criticism as being too narrow for the large amount of traffic carried between the mainland and the beach.

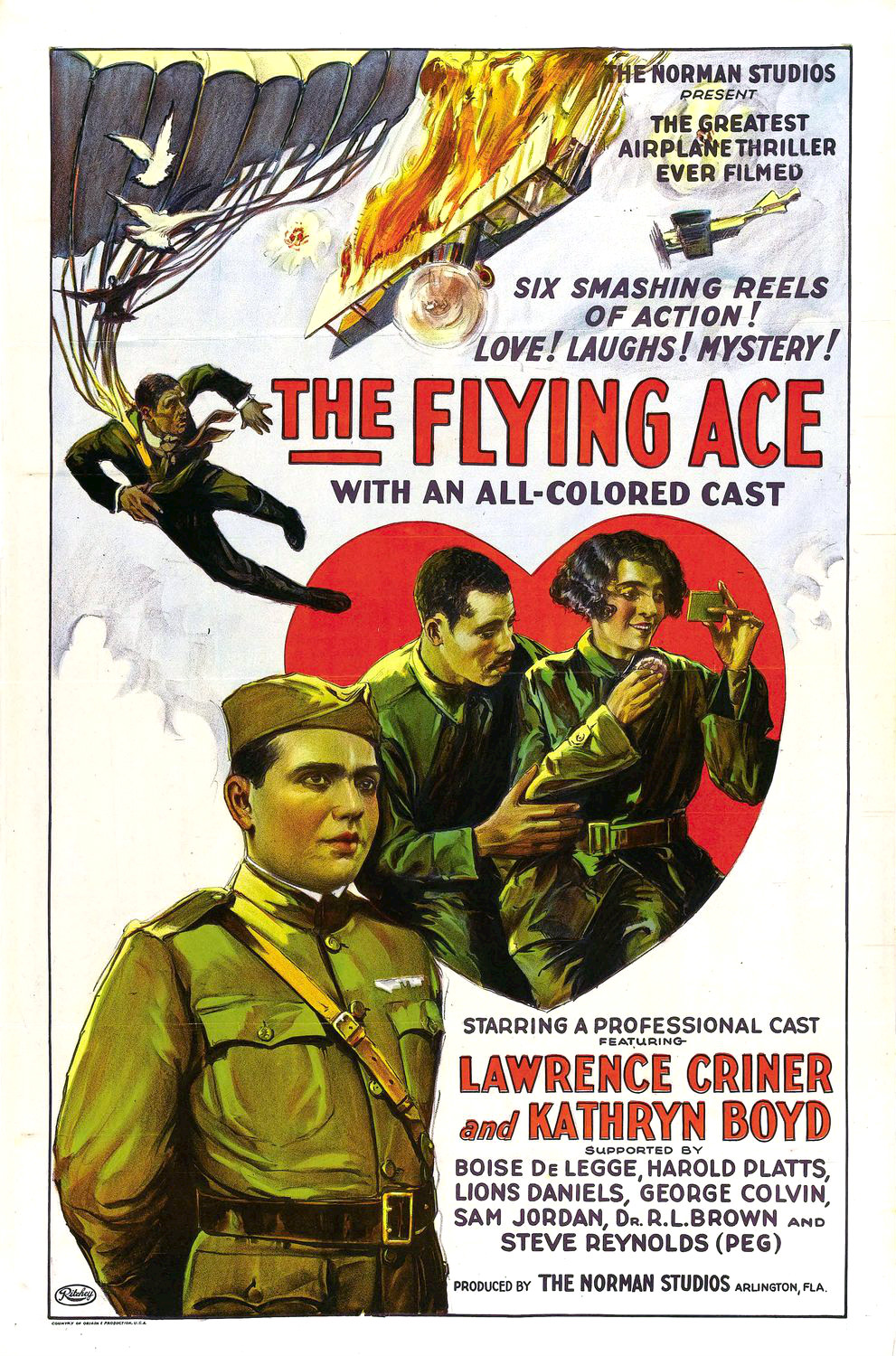
Poster for The Flying Ace starring Laurence Criner

Film Company Norman Studios was in Arlington in the 1920s. The studio's films included race films with African American casts.

In 1947 the administration of Jacksonville University purchased land in the Arlington neighborhood on which to establish a main campus. The first building was completed in 1950 and classes officially began. The same year the school received full accreditation as a two-year college from the Southern Association of Colleges and Schools (SACS). Originally known as William J. Porter University, Jacksonville University was founded in 1934 by William J. Porter. It began as a small private two-year college. Sixty students were enrolled in Porter University's first year of operation. The school changed its name to Jacksonville Junior College in 1935. It relocated three times over the next fifteen years, but the influx of GI bill students following the end of World War II made a permanent location necessary. The school received full accreditation in 1962 as a four-year school from SACS.

Following the 1953 opening of the Mathews Bridge the Arlington area experienced a significant increase in development, maintaining a faster growth rate than any other area in Jacksonville for two decades. The Mathews Bridge is a cantilever bridge which spans the St. Johns River, brings traffic along the Arlington Expressway between Downtown Jacksonville and Arlington. Midway between downtown and the beaches, the Sandalwood neighborhood began developing in spring of 1960 and is just one example of the many planned subdivisions beginning to sprawl across the area at that time.

Opening in 1967, Regency Square Mall is an enclosed shopping mall developed by Regency Centers. Constructed at an expanse of sand dunes at an expense of $12 million, it initially featured three anchor stores: national chain JCPenney, along with May-Cohens and Furchgotts. The mall also included a Woolworth dime store as a junior anchor, a cafeteria style Piccadilly restaurant, as well as the single-screen Regency Cinema. Annie Tiques bar and restaurant opened on an outparcel of the mall. According to an Urban Land Institute study published by the Florida Times-Union in 1979, it was one of the most profitable retail centers in the nation, with yearly average sales of $156/ft² versus a national average of $88/ft². To give back to the community, the mall operators turned over thousands of dollars in coins from their decorative fountains to charities. All types of social events, from art shows to science fairs to horticultural exhibits were held there.

Construction of the Dames Point Bridge began in 1985 and was completed in 1989. The bridge crosses the St. Johns River using a cable-stayed design, connecting Arlington to the Northside of Jacksonville. designed by HNTB Corporation and RS&H, Inc, and constructed by The Massman Construction Company, the main span is 1,300 feet (396.2 m), and is 175 feet (53.3 m) high. When built, it was longest concrete cable-stayed bridge in the world.

== Geography ==
Together with Northside, Westside, and Southside, Arlington is considered one of the large sections of Jacksonville. Initially, Arlington was a small settlement across the St. Johns River east of the present day central business district. The area grew substantially in the latter part of the 20th century, and now includes many smaller neighborhoods and developments. Today it refers to most of Jacksonville east and south of the St. Johns, west of the Intracoastal Waterway, and north of the Arlington River and Southside. Using GIS to sort 87 businesses with "Arlington" in their name, McEwen came to a similar definition, though noted that Arlington overlaps with Southside at its southern end.

=== Parks and open spaces ===
- Fort Caroline
- Jacksonville Arboretum & Gardens
- Marabanong
- Norman Studios
- Palm and Cycad Arboretum
- Timucuan Preserve
- Tree Hill Nature Center

== Economy ==
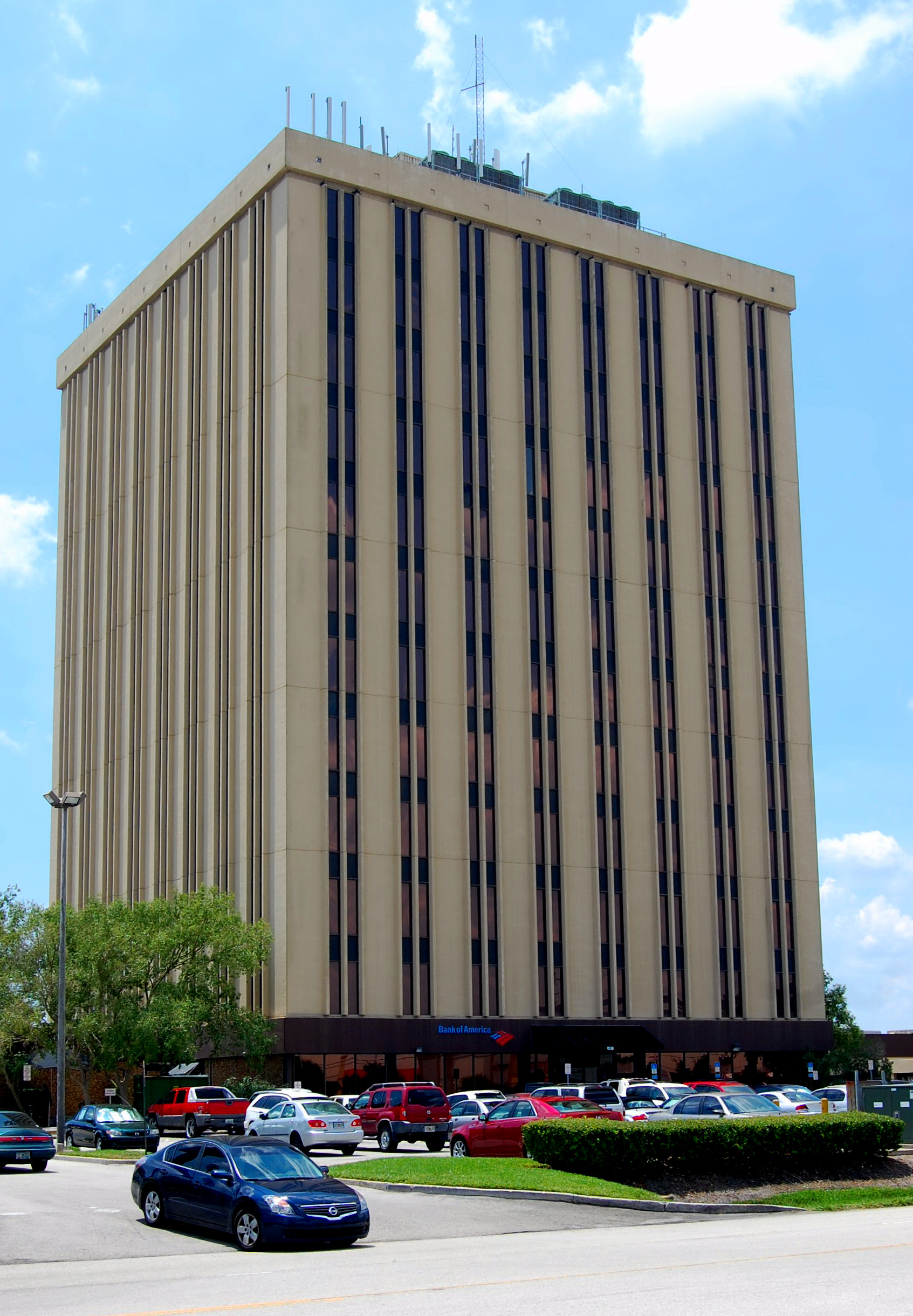
Regency Tower is an office building located near the corner of Regency Square Boulevard and Monument Road.

=== Commercial districts ===
The Regency area describes the commercial and retail development centered around Regency Square Mall. The commercial district encompasses an area equitable in size to Jacksonville's downtown, and consist of multiple corridors along the Southside Connector (SR 113). These include SR 115 (Southside Boulevard), SR 10 (Atlantic Boulevard), Regency Square Boulevard and Tredinick Parkway. In a 2010 Arlington vision plan, citizens recognized the Regency Square Mall property as being ripe for redevelopment, with the potential to attract new businesses and consumers. The comprehensive report covered environmental, economic, and quality of life issues in the Greater Arlington region. The groups approach to the mall property was to redevelop the land with transportation and density in mind. The approach would entail mix-used structures, a gridded street pattern, and infill development. Emphasis is put on the vastness of the area and its equitable size to downtown. Crowley Maritime Corporation, a shipping company, is headquartered in the Regency business district. As of July 2016, the company was ranked the 13th largest private company in Florida, with revenue of $2.2 billion.

== Education ==
The Duval County Public Schools district operates public schools, including Terry Parker High School, Arlington Middle School and Fort Caroline Middle School.

=== Higher education ===
==== Private colleges ====
Jacksonville University (JU) is a private university founded in 1934. It is a member of the Independent Colleges and Universities of Florida and is accredited by the Southern Association of Colleges and Schools (SACS) and the Association to Advance Collegiate Schools of Business (AACSB). JU offers more than 70 majors and programs at the undergraduate level, 23 master's degree programs and doctorate degree programs, leading to the M.S., M.A., M.A.T., and Master of Business Administration, and Doctor of Nursing Practice (DNP). The university is divided into four colleges and two institutes: the College of Arts and Sciences, the Davis College of Business (DCOB), the College of Fine Arts (CFA), the Brooks Rehabilitation College of Healthcare Sciences (BRCHS), the Marine Science Research Institute (MSRI), and its newest addition, the Public Policy Institute (PPI).

==== Public colleges ====
The south campus of Florida State College at Jacksonville is located at 11901 Beach Boulevard.

== Transportation ==
=== Airports ===
Jacksonville Executive at Craig Airport (IATA: CRG, ICAO: KCRG, FAA LID: CRG) is a public airport owned by the Jacksonville Aviation Authority. The airport covers an area of 1,432 acres (580 ha) containing two asphalt paved runways: 5/23 measuring 4,004 x 120 ft and 14/32 measuring 4,008 x 120 ft. The mid-sized general aviation airport handling 400-500 aircraft operations daily, consisting of personal aircraft and small commuter planes. On June 15, 1946, the United States Navy's Blue Angels performed their first airshow at Jacksonville Executive at Craig Airport.

=== Public transportation ===
Arlington is served by several Jacksonville Transportation Authority (JTA) bus routes. On December 1, 2014, JTA underwent a complete system redesign called Route Optimization. This was to provide more frequent, more direct, and more reliable service. The new routes in Arlington were as follows.

- 8 Beach / Town Center
- 9 Arlington / Beach
- 10 Atlantic
- 18 Atlantic / Monument
- 19 Arlington
- 23 Townsend / Southside
- 50 University
- 202 Mayport Express
- 205 Beaches Express
- 308 Arlington Community Shuttles

=== Roadways and bridges ===
==== Highways ====
Several major limited access highways traverse Arlington. These include:

- the Arlington Expressway (SR 10A)
- the East Beltway (I-295)
- the Southside Connector (SR-113)

==== Bridges ====
One bridge connects Arlington to Downtown Jacksonville, one bridge connects the Northside and two access the Beaches. These include, from west to east:

To Downtown: the Mathews Bridge

To the Northside: the Dames Point Bridge, officially known as the Napoleon Bonaparte Broward Bridge.

To the Beaches: the Charles E. Bennett Memorial Bridge and the Atlantic Boulevard Bridge

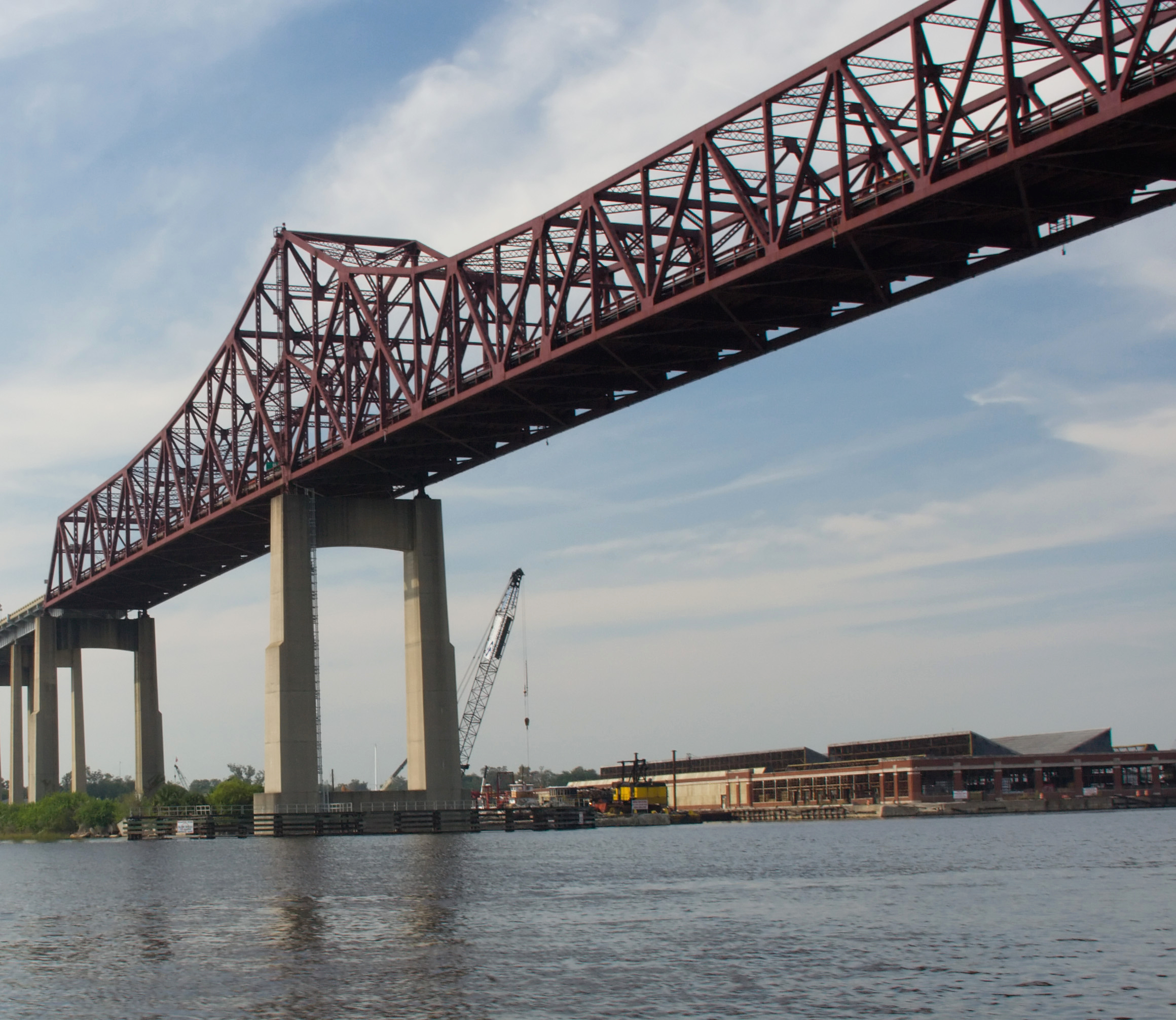
Mathews Bridge

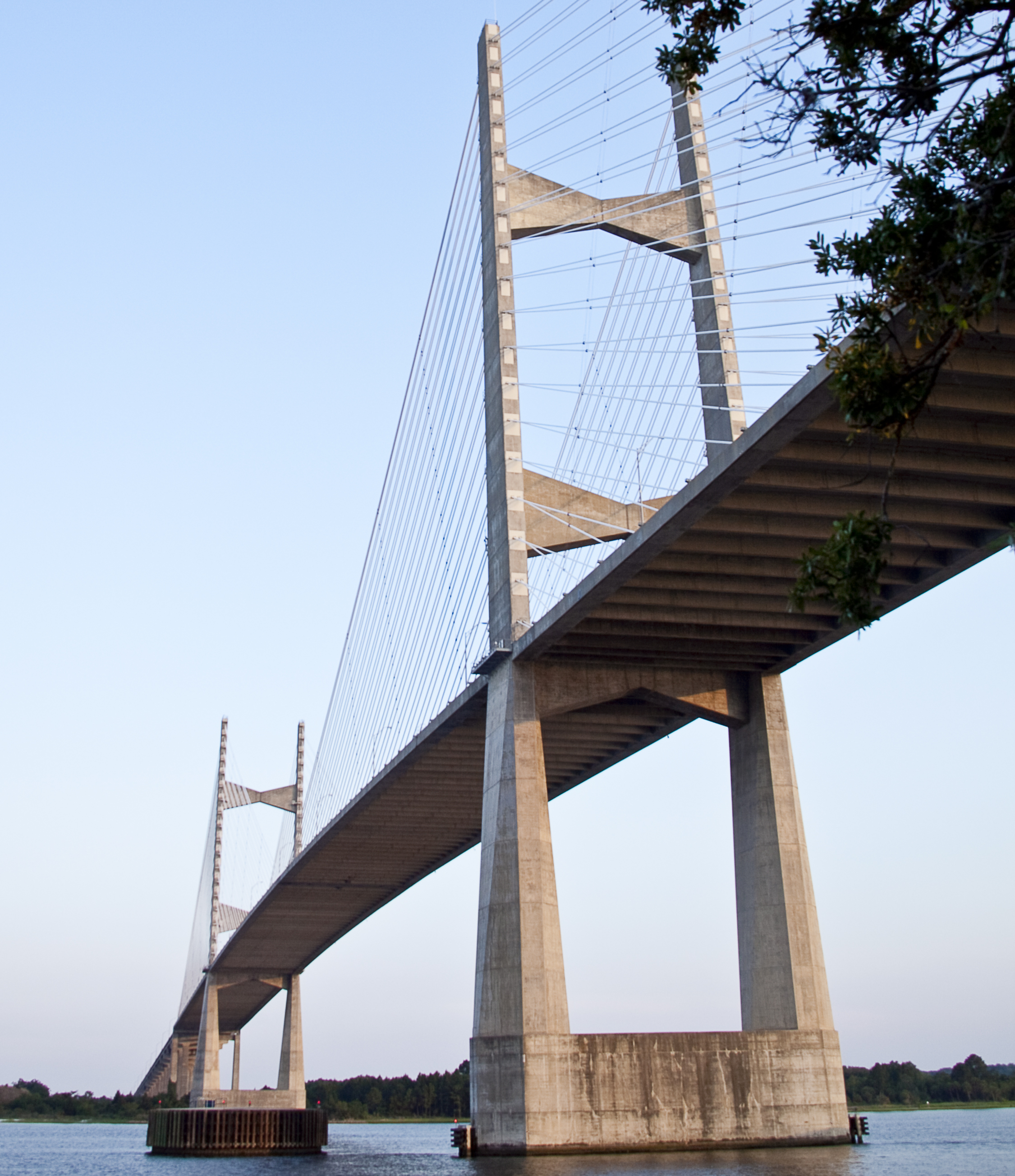
Dames Point Bridge

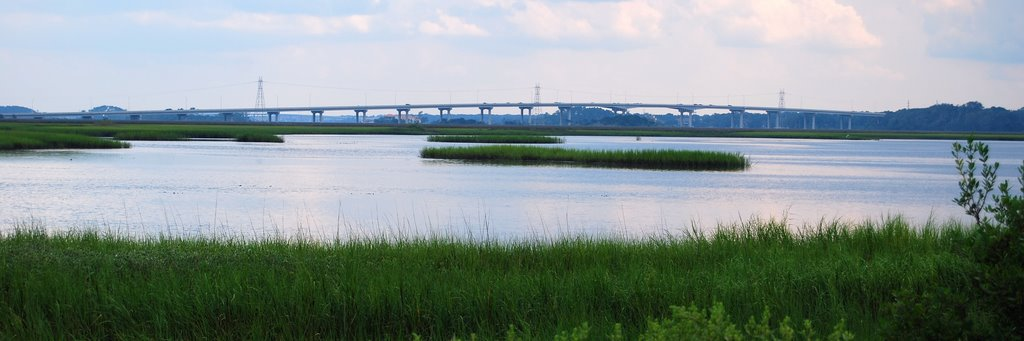
Charles E. Bennett Memorial Bridge

== See also ==
- Neighborhoods of Jacksonville
- Architecture of Jacksonville
- National Register of Historic Places listings in Duval County, Florida
