= Florida State Road 115 =

State highway in Florida, United States

State Road 115
- Florida State Road 115 highlighted in red

Route information
- Maintained by FDOT
- Length: 37.199 mi (59.866 km)
- Existed: 1945–present

Major junctions
- South end: US 1 in Jacksonville
- I-95 in Jacksonville; I-295 in Jacksonville
- North end: US 1 / US 23 in Callahan

Location
- Country: United States
- State: Florida

Highway system
- Florida State Highway System; Interstate; US; State; Former; Pre‑1945; Toll; Scenic
← SR 114	→ SR 116

State Road 115 (SR 115) is a state highway in the U.S. state of Florida.

== History ==
SR 115 was built in separately named segments by the Jacksonville Expressway Authority. The land for the southern section, south of Beach Boulevard, was donated by Jacksonville's Skinner family. Three siblings – Bryant, Dottie and Richard Jr. – inherited thousands of acres in southeast Duval County and needed roads through the area to access their property and facilitate development. The construction of Southside Boulevard was key to the growth of the south side of Jacksonville.

== Route description ==
=== Southern segment ===
SR 115 runs north as Southside Boulevard from its terminus at US 1, providing access to The Avenues. Right afterwards, the road goes through the largely residential and commercial south side of Jacksonville with crossings at Baymeadows Road (SR 152), Butler Boulevard (SR 202), Beach Boulevard (US 90), and Atlantic Boulevard (SR 10). At the Southside Connector (SR 113), SR 115 turns sharply to become the Arlington Expressway, heading west into downtown via the Mathews Bridge, where it turns north, becoming the Martin Luther King Jr. Parkway (former Haines Street Expressway), and again turning to the west along with the MLK Parkway (now the former 20th Street Expressway), before reaching I-95. The portion of the MLK Parkway is signed only as US 1 Alt. and US 1, not SR 115.

The southern segment serves primarily as a conduit between the residential neighborhoods of Southside and the commercialized areas farther north and downtown. Heavy traffic is commonplace along most of the road. To improve traffic flow, especially during rush-hours, in 2023 the FDOT installed Florida's first double median U-turn intersection at the interchange with Beach Blvd. (US 90). In 2024 it also completed a major redesign of the intersection with Gate Parkway, located just north of the cloverleaf interchange with SR 202 (Butler Boulevard expressway), and in the same year began reconstructing the intersection just south of the interchange. In early 2028, the FDOT is planning to begin reconfiguring the intersection north of Gate Parkway (at Southside Boulevard and Thouchton Road). These intersections' new designs replace some of the left turn movements with Michigan left turns in order to reduce the number of traffic light phases.

=== Northern segment ===
Approximately two miles of SR 115 run unsigned along I-95. The second section of signed road runs from the junction of I-95 and Norwood Avenue (SR 117) through northwest Jacksonville, passing through the Lake Forest section of the city before crossing a bridge over the Ribault River, where it enters Riverview and then crosses another bridge over the Trout River into the eastern edge of the College Park neighborhood, before entering the Garden City neighborhood at the intersection with Florida State Road 104. FL 115 continues through Garden City, until the interchange with I-295 and runs between the Forest Trails and the territory near the Jacksonville International Airport before crossing a bridge over the Thomas Creek where it crosses the Duval-Nassau County Line, and ending at New Kings Rd (US 1/US 23) in Callahan.

The northern segment has the same function as the southern, except that it is built to lower standards and carries traffic south from the densely populated areas northwest of downtown into the heart of the city. Northbound, it is also an alternative to US 1/US 23 as a route to Callahan.

== Exit list ==
County	Location	mi	km	Destinations	Notes
Duval	Jacksonville	0.000	0.000	US 1 (Philips Highway / SR 5) to I-95	Southern terminus
Duval	Jacksonville	1.63	2.62	I-95 south (SR 9) – Daytona Beach	no northbound exit; I-95 exit 340
Duval	Jacksonville	2.759	4.440	SR 152 (Baymeadows Road) to I-95 / I-295	
Duval	Jacksonville	4.92	7.92	SR 202 (Butler Boulevard) to I-95 / I-295 – University of North Florida, Jax Beaches	Cloverleaf interchange
Duval	Jacksonville	7.51	12.09	US 90 (Beach Boulevard / SR 212) – Florida State College South Campus, Jax Beaches	Interchange; south end of US 90 Alt. concurrency
Duval	Jacksonville	9.572	15.405	US 90 Alt. west / SR 10 (Atlantic Boulevard)	North end of US 90 Alt. concurrency
Duval	Jacksonville	9.78	15.74	Frontage Road	Northbound exit only; to CB Square shopping center
Duval	Jacksonville	9.971	16.047	To SR 10 (Atlantic Boulevard) – Beaches (SR 10A east)	South end of SR 10A concurrency; south end of freeway
Duval	Jacksonville	10.01	16.11	SR 113 north (Southside Connector) to I-295	Interchange; southern terminus of SR 113
Duval	Jacksonville	see Arlington Expressway (mile 5.94-1.24)			
Duval	Jacksonville	14.72	23.69	To I-95 – Downtown Jacksonville, Sports Complex (SR 10A west / SR 115A south / SR 139 north)	North end of SR 10A concurrency
Duval	Jacksonville	see MLK Parkway (mile 0.11-3.96)			
Duval	Jacksonville	18.51	29.79	I-95 south (SR 9 / SR 15) / US 1 north (M.L. King Jr. Parkway / SR 15) – Daytona Beach, Amtrak	North end of US 1 concurrency; south end of I-95/SR 9 concurrency; I-95 exit 354
Duval	Jacksonville	19.02	30.61	Golfair Boulevard (SR 122)	I-95 exit 355
Duval	Jacksonville	20.31	32.69	I-95 north (SR 9) / SR 117 south (Norwood Avenue) – International Airport, Savannah	North end of I-95/SR 9 concurrency; north end of freeway; I-95 exit 356
Duval	Jacksonville	21.233	34.171	SR 111 (Edgewood Avenue) to I-95	
Duval	Jacksonville	24.949	40.152	SR 104 (Dunn Avenue)	
Duval	Jacksonville	26.17	42.12	I-295 (SR 9A) – Daytona Beach, Savannah	I-295 exit 32
Nassau	Callahan	37.199	59.866	US 1 / US 23 (SR 15)	
1.000 mi = 1.609 km; 1.000 km = 0.621 mi: Concurrency terminus; Incomplete access

== Related Routes ==
=== State Road 115A ===
State Road 115A
- Location: Jacksonville

Two unsigned sections of State Road 115A (SR 115A) exist in close proximity to each other east of Downtown Jacksonville. One is the approximately 500 feet (150 m) stub of MLK Parkway south of SR 115; the other carries US 1 Alt. for 1.254 miles (2.018 km) between the Hart Bridge (SR 228) and MLK Parkway (SR 115). Some sources (including FDOT's straight line diagrams) indicate a third SR 115A on the ramps connecting SR 115 to I-95 at exit 340.

=== State Road 1151 ===
State Road 1151
- Location: Jacksonville

State Road 1151 is the unsigned designation for Haines Street, a one way northbound frontage road, running to the east of US 1 Alt/SR 115 in Jacksonville opposite SR 1153. The road is 0.503 miles (0.810 km) long and runs from Winthrop Street near Glen Myra Park to the MLK Parkway underpass. From there it continues west as East 17th Street. At no point is the road contiguous with SR 115 or any other state highway.

=== State Road 1153 ===
State Road 1153
- Location: Jacksonville

State Road 1153 is the unsigned designation for Haines Street, a one way southbound frontage road, running to the west of US 1 Alt./SR 115 in Jacksonville opposite SR 1151. The road is 0.620 miles (0.998 km) long and runs from East 15th Street to East 8th Street. The MLK Parkway exit for 8th Street and the Jaxport Talleyrand Terminal uses SR 1153 as access.

=== State Road 1155 ===
State Road 1155
- Location: Jacksonville

State Road 1155 is the unsigned designation for Eve Drive and Patton Road in Jacksonville. It runs for 0.224 miles (0.360 km) connecting Beach Boulevard (US 90/SR 212) with Southside Service Road (SR 115F north).

Browse numbered routes
← SR 1051	SR 1151; SR 1153; SR 1155	→ SR 2221
