= Florida State Road 116 =

State highway in Florida, United States

State Road 116
- SR 116 highlighted in red

Route information
- Maintained by FDOT
- Length: 9.026 mi (14.526 km)
- Existed: 2004–present

Major junctions
- West end: I-295 in Jacksonville
- SR 113 in Jacksonville; SR A1A near Mayport
- East end: SR 101 southeast of Mayport

Location
- Country: United States
- State: Florida
- Counties: Duval County

Highway system
- Florida State Highway System; Interstate; US; State; Former; Pre‑1945; Toll; Scenic
← SR 115A	→ SR 117

State Road 116 (SR 116) is a 9.026-mile-long (14.526 km) state highway in the northeastern part of the U.S. state of Florida. It travels nearly due west-east entirely within the city limits of Jacksonville, in Duval County. At its western terminus, SR 116 is signed as Merrill Road beginning at the interchange with Interstate 295 (I-295; Jacksonville East Beltway) and SR 113 (Southside Connector) near the St. Johns River. At its eastern terminus, it is signed as Wonderwood Road, ending at the intersection with SR 101 (Mayport Road) just south of Naval Station Mayport. Here, the Wonderwood Road designation continues to Hanna Park.

Since the central purpose of SR 116 was to build a bridge over the Intracoastal Waterway connecting Wonderwood Drive to the rest of Jacksonville, locals often unofficially refer to SR 116 as "Wonderwood Connector" or simply "Wonderwood". Officially, the stretch is signed as a number of existing local roads that were utilized as parts of the route of SR 116. These sections are known as Merrill Road, Ft. Caroline Road, McCormick Road, Mt. Pleasant Road, and Wonderwood Drive.

== History ==
Due to rapid growth in the East Arlington area and near SR 105 (Zoo Parkway/Heckscher Drive), a connection from the I-295 corridor to Naval Station Mayport was seen as a great need.

Over the years, traffic back-ups at the Atlantic Boulevard flyover ramp escalated, as it was the only direct route to the base. These back-ups often took hours to clear, and with the rapid growth in the area, combined with the need for another hurricane evacuation route, a new road with a bridge over the Intercoastal Waterway was a necessity. The base needed a more-direct route from the corridor since it was easy for new people to the area to get lost on previous directions from exits on I-295, such as SR 10 (Atlantic Boulevard) and Monument Road.

The improvements to – and subsequent de facto replacement of – Merrill Road, Ft. Caroline Road, and McCormick Road occurred in stages. However, these roads are still in use today and are designated by signage still displayed on them.

The road includes the Charles E. Bennett Memorial Bridge over the Intercoastal Waterway, connecting San Pablo Island to the mainland. It was completed in late 2004.

== Major intersections ==
The entire route is in Jacksonville, Duval County.

mi	km	Destinations	Notes
0.000	0.000	west end of state maintenance	
0.16	0.26	I-295 (SR 9A / Jacksonville Eastern Beltway) to I-95 – International Airport, Savannah, Jax Beaches, Daytona Beach	I-295 exit 46
0.30	0.48	SR 113 south (Southside Connector) / Arlington Expressway / Southside Boulevard (SR 10A west / SR 115)	Interchange
6.694– 7.374	10.773– 11.867	Charles E. Bennett Memorial Bridge over Atlantic Intracoastal Waterway	
8.064	12.978	SR A1A – St. Johns River Ferry, Naval Station Mayport Carrier Docks / Commercial Vehicle Gate	
9.026	14.526	SR 101 (Mayport Road) / Wonderwood Road east – Naval Station Mayport Main Entrance, Hanna Park	Eastern terminus
1.000 mi = 1.609 km; 1.000 km = 0.621 mi
