= Florida State Road 101 =

State highway in Florida, United States

State Road 101
- SR 101 highlighted in red

Route information
- Maintained by FDOT
- Length: 1.209 mi (1.946 km)
- Existed: 1945 renumbering (definition)–present

Major junctions
- South end: SR A1A in Atlantic Beach
- SR 116 near Mayport
- North end: Maine Street in Naval Station Mayport southeast of Mayport

Location
- Country: United States
- State: Florida

Highway system
- Florida State Highway System; Interstate; US; State; Former; Pre‑1945; Toll; Scenic
← SR 100	→ SR 102

State Road 101 (SR 101) (also known as Mayport Road) is a 1.209-mile-long (1.946 km) state highway in Duval County, in the First Coast part of the U.S. state of Florida. It connects SR A1A to the south side of Naval Station Mayport on Maine Street. Along its route, SR 101 meets the east end of SR 116 (Wonderwood Drive). At the south end of SR 101, Mayport Road continues on SR A1A to Atlantic Boulevard (SR 10). After going under the SR A1A/SR 10 bridge, Mayport Road becomes Florida Boulevard.

There is an erroneous exit sign on SR 10 east for the southern end of Mayport Road. It says the exit is for SR 101, however the road is actually SR A1A north at this point; SR 101 does not start until about 2.3 miles (3.7 km) farther to the north.

== Route description ==
SR 101 begins at an intersection with SR A1A at the northern end of Atlantic Beach, heading north on four-lane divided Mayport Road through a portion of Jacksonville. The road passes through areas of homes and businesses before becoming a five-lane road with a center left-turn lane and coming to an intersection with the eastern terminus of SR 116. Following this, the state road heads between wetlands to the west and wooded neighborhoods to the east as a four-lane undivided road. SR 101 reaches its northern terminus at the entrance to Naval Station Mayport.

== History ==
Mayport Road was added to the state highway system in the 1940s as State Road 560. In the 1945 renumbering it was assigned the State Road 101 designation. Later, when SR A1A was realigned from its original northern terminus of Jacksonville to cross the Mayport Ferry, SR 101 was truncated.

== Major intersections ==
The entire route is in Jacksonville, Duval County.

mi	km	Destinations	Notes
0.000	0.000	SR A1A (Mayport Road) – Mayport, St. Augustine	Southern terminus
1.008	1.622	SR 116 west (Wonderwood Road) – Commercial Vehicle Gate, Hanna Park	Eastern terminus of SR 116
1.209	1.946	Northern end of state maintenance at Naval Station Mayport Main Gate	
1.000 mi = 1.609 km; 1.000 km = 0.621 mi
