= Florida State Road 113 =

State highway in Florida, United States

State Road 113
- Southside Connector
- SR 113 highlighted in red

Route information
- Maintained by FDOT
- Length: 2.770 mi (4.458 km)

Major junctions
- South end: SR 115 in Jacksonville
- SR 116 in Jacksonville
- North end: I-295 in Jacksonville

Location
- Country: United States
- State: Florida
- Counties: Duval

Highway system
- Florida State Highway System; Interstate; US; State; Former; Pre‑1945; Toll; Scenic
← SR 112	→ SR 114

State Road 113 (SR 113), also known as Southside Connector, is a 2.770-mile-long (4.458 km) state highway. The freeway travels almost due north–south entirely within the neighborhood of Jacksonville known as Arlington. This is completely within the city limits of Jacksonville, in Duval County, in the U.S. state of Florida. As its name implies, it "connects" SR 115 with Interstate 295 (I-295).

== Route description ==
SR 113 begins at an interchange with SR 115 (Southside Boulevard / Arlington Expressway) just north of SR 10 (Atlantic Boulevard). It heads northeast and travels along the west edge of Regency Square Mall. It then has service roads on both sides that are one-way with traffic traveling the same direction as the main highway (i.e., the northbound one is on the eastern side, and the southbound one is on the western side). Northbound, it has an interchange with Regency Square Boulevard North and then curves to the north to an interchange with Tredinick Parkway. On the southbound side, these two exits are combined. At Tredinick Parkway, there is a Texas U-turn that allows traffic from the southbound service road to make a U-turn to access the northbound one without accessing Tredinick Parkway itself. After that, there is an interchange with the western terminus of SR 116 (Merrill Road), which leads to an interchange with Interstate 295 (I-295; Jacksonville East Beltway) south. Almost immediately afterward, the freeway curves to the northwest and feeds into I-295 north.

== Exit list ==
The entire route is in Jacksonville, Duval County. All exits are unnumbered.

mi	km	Destinations	Notes
0.000– 0.322	0.000– 0.518	SR 115 (Southside Boulevard south) / Arlington Expressway (SR 10A) – Downtown	Southern terminus of SR 113; northern terminus of Southside Boulevard
0.693	1.115	Regency Square Boulevard North	Southbound exit via Tredinick Parkway exit
1.334	2.147	Tredinick Parkway	Southbound exit via Tredinick Parkway exit
2.317	3.729	SR 116 east (Merrill Road / Wonderwood Connector east) to I-295 south	Western terminus of SR 116 and Wonderwood Connector
2.770	4.458	I-295 north (SR 9A) to I-95 – Int'l Airport	Northern terminus; I-295 exit 45
1.000 mi = 1.609 km; 1.000 km = 0.621 mi
