= Florida State Road 123 =

Bypass for State Road 85 in Florida

Roger J. Clary Highway
- Florida State Road 123 highlighted in red

Route information
- Maintained by FDOT
- Length: 5.175 mi (8.328 km)

Major junctions
- South end: SR 85 near Niceville
- North end: SR 85 in Eglin AFB

Location
- Country: United States
- State: Florida
- Counties: Okaloosa

Highway system
- Florida State Highway System; Interstate; US; State; Former; Pre‑1945; Toll; Scenic
← SR 122	→ SR 126

State Road 123 (SR 123) is a 5.175-mile-long (8.328 km) north–south state highway that bypasses the stretch of State Road 85 through Niceville, Florida. The highway is a more direct route to Fort Walton Beach from points north. With flyover ramps at both intersections of SR 85 now completed, the highway has been widened into a 4-lane divided highway.

== Route description ==
SR 123 begins at an intersection with SR 85 north of Northwest Florida Regional Airport to the southwest of Niceville in Okaloosa County, heading north-northeast on two-lane undivided Roger J. Clary Highway. The road passes through forested areas on the grounds of Eglin Air Force Base, bypassing Niceville to the west. SR 123 reaches its northern terminus at another intersection with SR 85 northwest of Niceville.

== History ==
In 2013 an interchange was completed at the southern terminus of Florida State Road 123 at Florida State Road 85. Work having begun in 2009, the main feature of the project was a new flyover ramp connecting S.R. 85 northbound to S.R. 123 northbound, in addition to widening SR 85 to six lanes between General Bond Boulevard and the Northwest Florida Regional Airport. A similar flyover ramp to connect SR 123 northbound to SR 85 south of Crestview was scheduled to begin construction in 2014.

== Major intersections ==
The entire route is in Eglin AFB, Okaloosa County.

mi	km	Destinations	Notes
0.000	0.000	SR 85 – Fort Walton Beach, Valparaiso, Niceville, Eglin AFB, Northwest Florida Regional Airport	interchange
5.175	8.328	SR 85 to I-10 – Crestview, Niceville	
1.000 mi = 1.609 km; 1.000 km = 0.621 mi
