= Arlington Expressway =

Road in Jacksonville, Florida

State Road 10A
- Arlington Expressway

Route information
- Maintained by FDOT
- Length: 6.498 mi (10.458 km)

Major junctions
- West end: US 1 / US 17 / US 23 in Jacksonville
- East end: SR 10 in Jacksonville

Location
- Country: United States
- State: Florida
- Counties: Duval

Highway system
- Florida State Highway System; Interstate; US; State; Former; Pre‑1945; Toll; Scenic
| ← SR 10 | → SR 11 |

The Arlington Expressway, which carries the unsigned State Road 10A (SR 10A) and mostly also the signed State Road 115 in Jacksonville, Florida, is a freeway that heads east from Downtown Jacksonville over the Mathews Bridge to Atlantic Boulevard (State Road 10) at the Regency Square Mall.

== Route description ==
SR 10A begins downtown overlapping SR 139 on a one-way pair at Main Street (US 1 / US 17), with eastbound SR 10A following Union Street and westbound following State Street. At the intersection with North Liberty Street, SR 10A leaves city streets and enters the Arlington Expressway, which includes sidewalks west of the Mathews Bridge, a rarity on freeways. The first interchange is with A. Philip Randolph Boulevard for the Sports Complex, followed by a junction with the Martin Luther King Jr. Parkway, where SR 139 ends and SR 115 joins the expressway to cross the Mathews Bridge over the St. Johns River. This bridge also runs over the Exchange Club Park island. After crossing the bridge, the first interchange is with State Road 109 north followed by another with SR 109 south. Two other interchanges exists with Arlington Road and then with local businesses along the service roads. Just after the interchange with northbound State Road 113 (Southside Connector), State Road 115 (Southside Boulevard) turns south, while SR 10A continues east to terminate at State Road 10.

== Exit list ==
The entire route is in Jacksonville, Duval County.

| mi | km | Destinations | Notes |
|---|---|---|---|
| 0.000 | 0.000 | US 1 / US 17 north / SR 228 east (North Main Street / SR 5) US 17 south / US 23 north / SR 228 west (State Street / SR 139 north) to I-95 | west end of US 1 / US 17 / SR 5 / SR 228 overlap (westbound only) |
| 0.072 | 0.116 | US 1 north / US 17 north (North Ocean Street / SR 5 north / SR 228 west) | east end of US 1 / US 17 / SR 5 / SR 228 overlap (westbound only) |
| 0.317 | 0.510 | North Liberty Street | intersection; west end of freeway |
| 0.42 | 0.68 | Union Street | eastbound exit and westbound entrance |
| 0.86 | 1.38 | A. Philip Randolph Boulevard - Sports Complex | Westbound right-in/right-out to Spearing Street |
| 1.24 | 2.00 | US 1 Alt. north (M.L. King Jr. Parkway / SR 115 north / SR 115A south) – Sports Complex | west end of SR 115 overlap |
| 1.381– 2.779 | 2.223– 4.472 | Mathews Bridge over St. Johns River | |
| 3.16 | 5.09 | SR 109 north (University Boulevard) | temporary southern terminus of SR 109 |
| 3.61 | 5.81 | SR 109 south / SR 109A north (Cesery Boulevard) / Service Road (SR 115F) | temporary northern terminus of SR 109 |
| 4.26 | 6.86 | Service Road (SR 115F) / Arlington Road | |
| 4.9 | 7.9 | Service Road (SR 115F east) | Eastbound exit only |
| 5.047 | 8.122 | Service Road (SR 115F) | Eastbound unsigned right-in/right-out, westbound entrance from Townsend Boulevard |
| 5.25 | 8.45 | Service Road (SR 115F west) / Arlingwood Avenue | Westbound exit and entrance; right-in/right-out; to former Expressway Mall |
| 5.8 | 9.3 | Service Road (SR 115F) / Mill Creek Road / Century Street / Arlingwood Avenue | Right-in/right-out westbound; Century Street signed eastbound only, Arlingwood Avenue signed westbound only |
| 5.94 | 9.56 | SR 113 north (Southside Connector) to I-295 | eastbound exit and westbound entrance |
| 5.94 | 9.56 | SR 115 south (Southside Boulevard) | east end of freeway; east end of SR 115 overlap; no westbound exit |
| 6.498 | 10.458 | SR 10 (Atlantic Boulevard) – Jax Beaches | |
1.000 mi = 1.609 km; 1.000 km = 0.621 mi
