= Florida State Road 117 =

State highway in Florida, United States

State Road 117
- Norwood Avenue
- SR 117 highlighted in red

Route information
- Maintained by FDOT
- Length: 1.5 mi (2.4 km)

Major junctions
- South end: SR 122 in Jacksonville
- North end: I-95 in Jacksonville

Location
- Country: United States
- State: Florida
- Counties: Duval

Highway system
- Florida State Highway System; Interstate; US; State; Former; Pre‑1945; Toll; Scenic
← SR 116	→ SR 120

State Road 117 (SR 117) is a 1.5-mile-long (2.4 km) state highway in Jacksonville, Florida. It is known as Norwood Avenue for its entire length.

== Route description ==
SR 117 is located just north of downtown Jacksonville. It begins at SR 122 (Golfair Boulevard) in the Brentwood section of the city. SR 117 is known as Norwood Avenue. Going north, the highway passes the Holy Rosary Catholic Road and School before coming to an intersection with 44th Street, where a shopping center is located. After this complex, SR 117 runs through a residential area named Norwood before terminating at Interstate 95 (I-95) and being replaced by Lem Turner Boulevard (SR 115).

== Major intersections ==
The entire route is in Jacksonville, Duval County.

mi	km	Destinations	Notes
0.0	0.0	SR 122	Southern terminus
0.5	0.80	44th Street	
1.5	2.4	I-95	Northern terminus; I-95 exit 356
1.000 mi = 1.609 km; 1.000 km = 0.621 mi
