= Florida State Road 114 =

State highway in Florida, United States

State Road 114
- 8th Street
- SR 114 highlighted in red

Route information
- Maintained by FDOT
- Length: 0.584 mi (940 m)

Major junctions
- West end: Francis Street in Jacksonville
- I-95 in Jacksonville
- East end: Boulevard in Jacksonville

Location
- Country: United States
- State: Florida
- Counties: Duval

Highway system
- Florida State Highway System; Interstate; US; State; Former; Pre‑1945; Toll; Scenic
← SR 113	→ SR 115

State Road 114 (SR 114) is a 0.584-mile-long (940 m) state highway that travels entirely within the city limits of Jacksonville. It is known as 8th Street for its entire length, which is exclusively in the Hogan's Creek neighborhood.

== Route description ==
It starts at the intersection of Francis and 8th Streets, heading east on 8th Street. There is an interchange with Interstate 95 500 feet (150 m) from the route's beginning. It passes through the UF Health Jacksonville complex, bisecting its campus, and ends shortly thereafter just beyond Boulevard. The thoroughfare continues for several miles as 8th Street.

== Major intersections ==
The entire route is in Jacksonville, Duval County.

mi	km	Destinations	Notes
0.000	0.000	Francis Street	west end of state maintenance
0.11	0.18	I-95 (SR 9)	I-95 exit 353D
0.539	0.867	Boulevard	
0.584	0.940	east end of state maintenance	
1.000 mi = 1.609 km; 1.000 km = 0.621 mi
