= Mathews Bridge =

Bridge in Jacksonville, Florida, United States of America

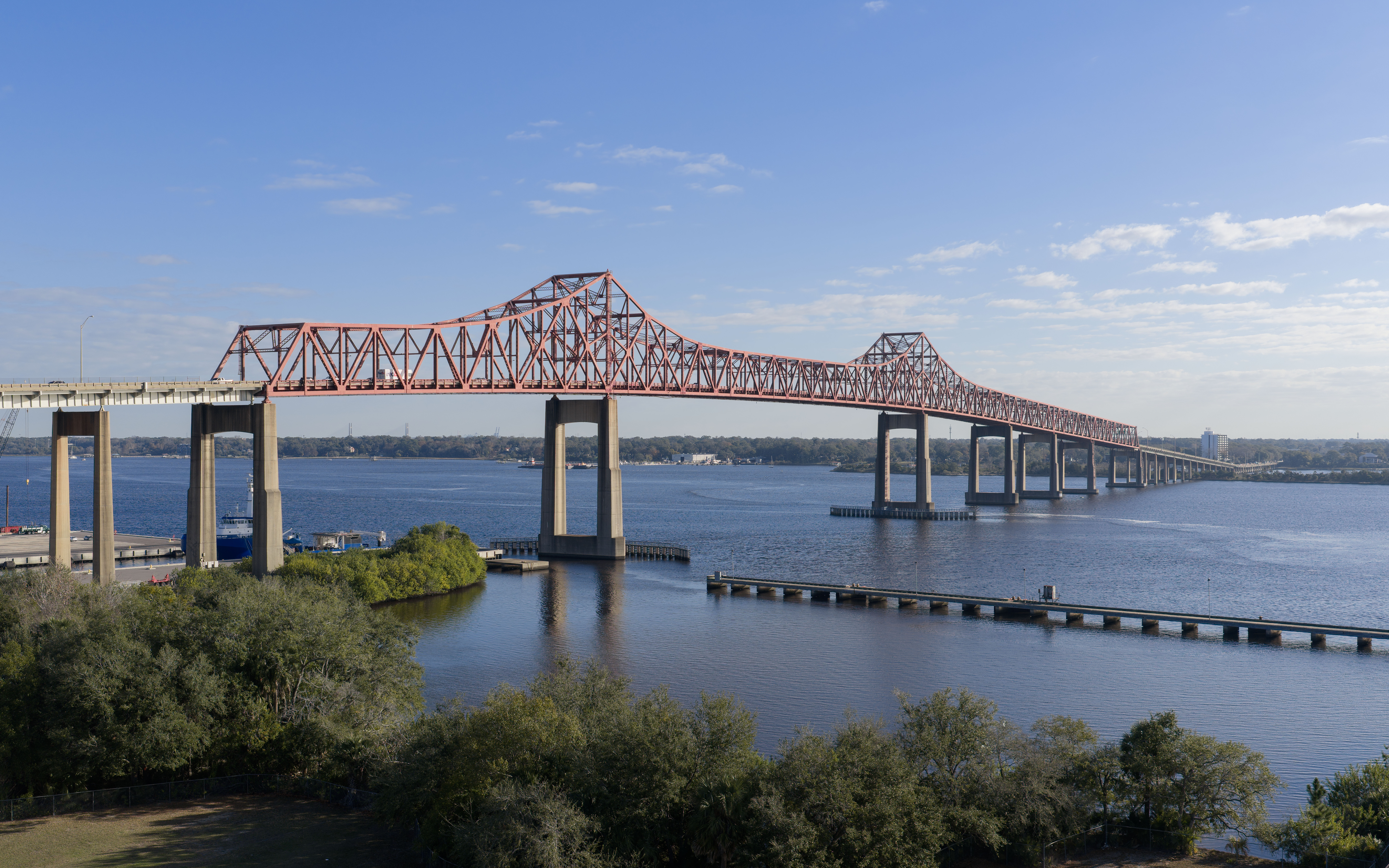
- Coordinates: 30.327°N 81.618°W
- Carries: US 90 Alt. (four general purpose lanes)
- Crosses: St. Johns River
- Locale: Jacksonville, Florida
- Official name: John E. Mathews Bridge
- Maintained by: Florida Department of Transportation
- ID number: 720076

Characteristics
- Design: Steel cantilever bridge
- Total length: 2,248.2 metres (7,376 ft)
- Width: 17.7 metres (58 ft)
- Longest span: 246.9 metres (810 ft)
- Clearance above: 6.80 metres (22.3 ft)
- Clearance below: 46.3 metres (152 ft)

History
- Opened: April 15, 1953; 73 years ago

Statistics
- Daily traffic: 13,700 (2019)

Location
- Interactive map of Mathews Bridge

The Mathews Bridge is a cantilever bridge in Jacksonville, Florida, which spans the St. Johns River. Constructed in 1953, the bridge brings traffic along the Arlington Expressway between downtown Jacksonville and the Arlington neighborhood. It was named after John Mathews, a Florida state legislator and Chief Justice of the 1955 Florida Supreme Court who helped gather funding for the bridge's construction. Originally silver in color, the bridge was painted garnet in 1984 in celebration of Jacksonville's short-lived United States Football League franchise, the Jacksonville Bulls.

== History ==
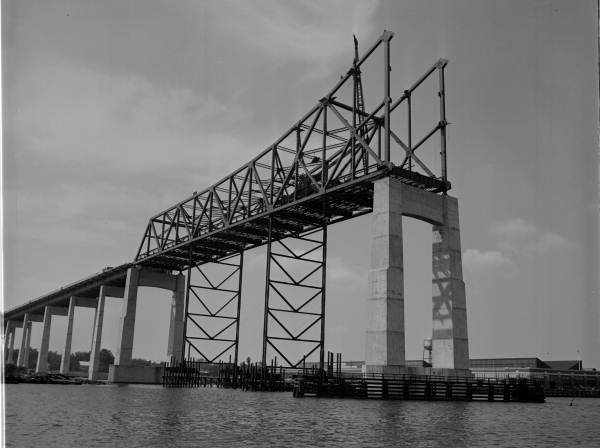
Construction of the Mathews Bridge in 1952.

Discussion on building a bridge to Arlington and the beaches began in the early 20th century when cars became more popular. In 1938 Duval County Commission discontinued ferry service to help encourage support for a new bridge. At this time, only the Acosta Bridge and Main Street Bridge crossed the St. Johns River for vehicle use. Another reason for a new bridge was congestion on the two bridges. John E. Mathews, a state legislator and Chief Justice of the Supreme Court, helped secure funding for a new bridge. The cost of constructing a bridge was $11 million to be backed by bonds and toll revenues. Tolls remained for the Mathews Bridge until 1989. The John E. Mathews Bridge opened on April 15, 1953.

The bridge had a notoriously problematic grating in the center span. After the previous grating wore out, a new one was installed, causing drivers to complain that the replacement was slippery and difficult to cross. That grating was replaced with a new, "state of the art" grating, which also provoked controversy causing citizens to pressure the Jacksonville City Council to act again concerning the grating. This initially only resulted in reducing the speed limit and roughing up the grating. In 2007, the bridge underwent a $12.9 million deck replacement project to replace the open grating over the center span with a concrete riding surface, and has since been reopened for public use.

In the early afternoon on September 26, 2013, the Military Sealift Command ship USNS 1st Lt. Harry L. Martin collided with the center span of the Mathews Bridge. The damage caused to the bridge was sufficient that it was closed indefinitely until it could be inspected and repaired. Following repairs, the Mathews Bridge reopened in the early morning of October 29, 2013.

Part of the reason of the accident was because the charted height of the bridge was incorrect. The bridge owners (Florida Department of Transportation) notified the Coast Guard that the bridge was surveyed and the new height was 146 feet (45 m). This new measurement is 6 feet (1.8 m) lower than the previously published height.

No notification of the vessel's height has been published by the Navy, but local news articles report that FDOT has evidence that the vessel's height was also 5 1/2 feet (1.7 m) taller than its plans indicated.

== Gallery ==
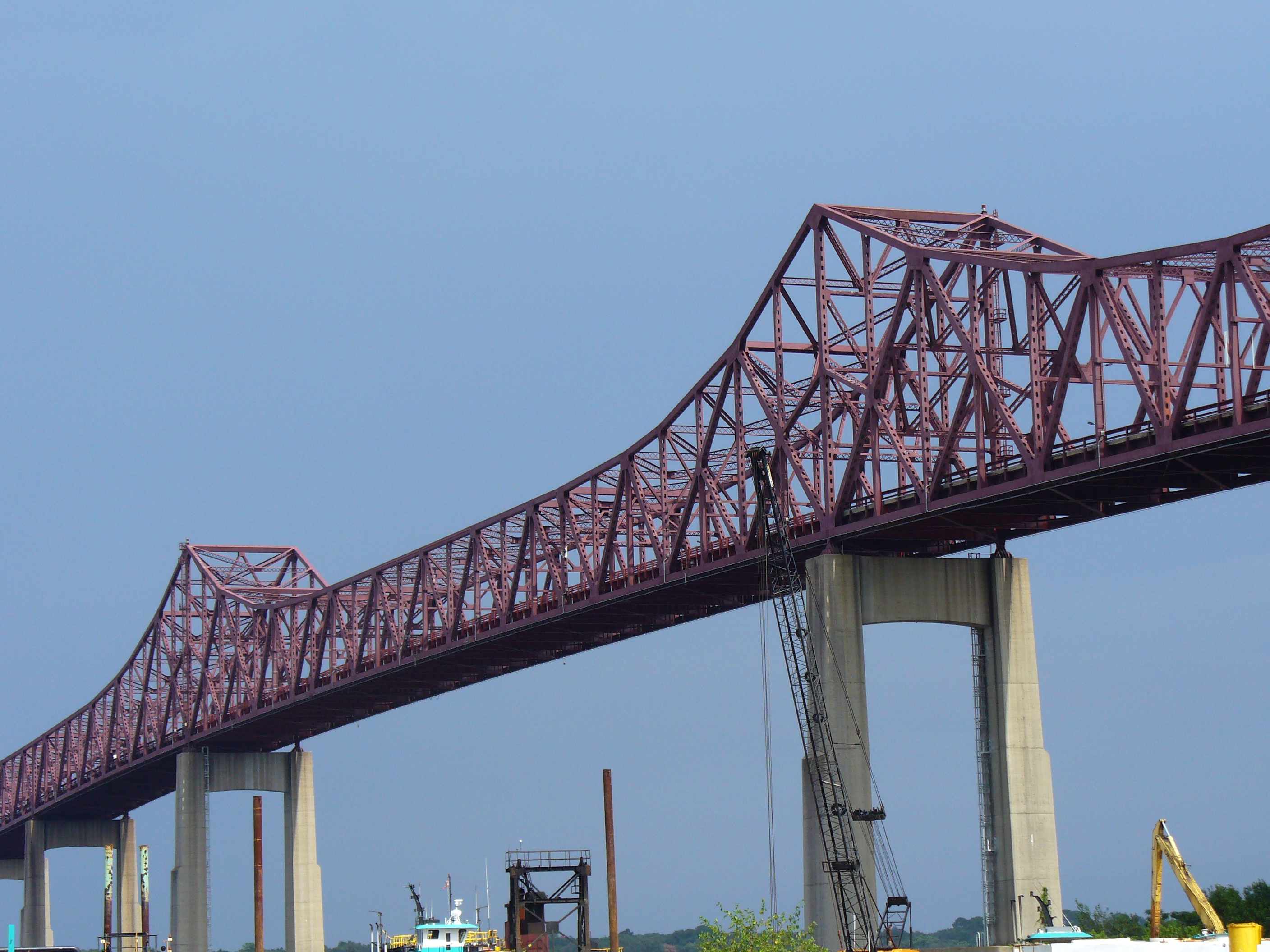
The bridge in 2008

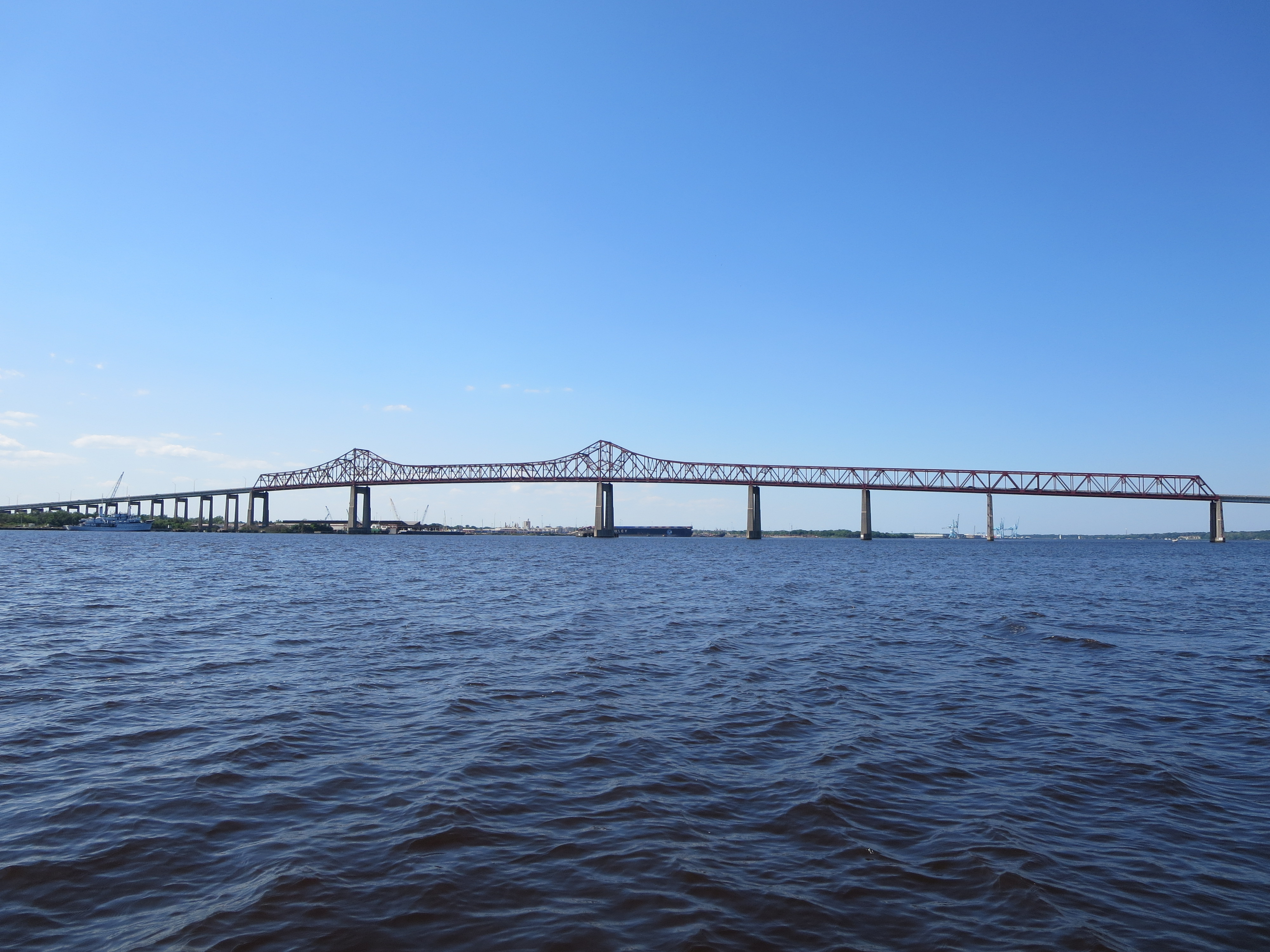
Mathews Bridge from the St. Johns River.

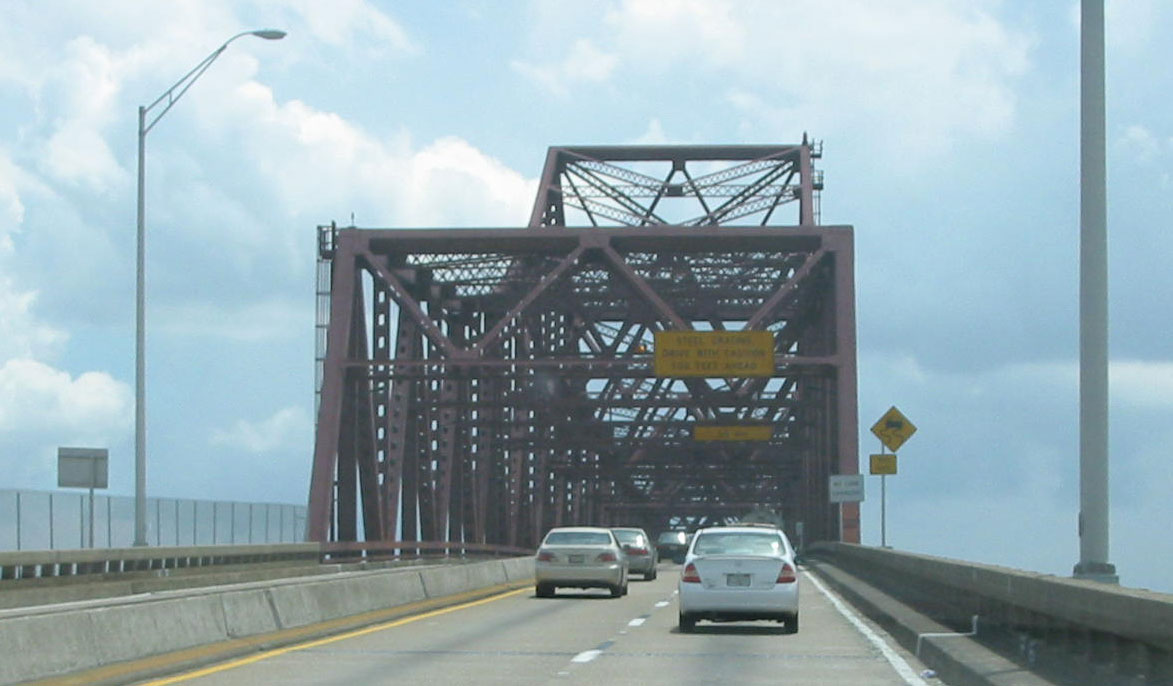
Eastbound on the Mathews Bridge

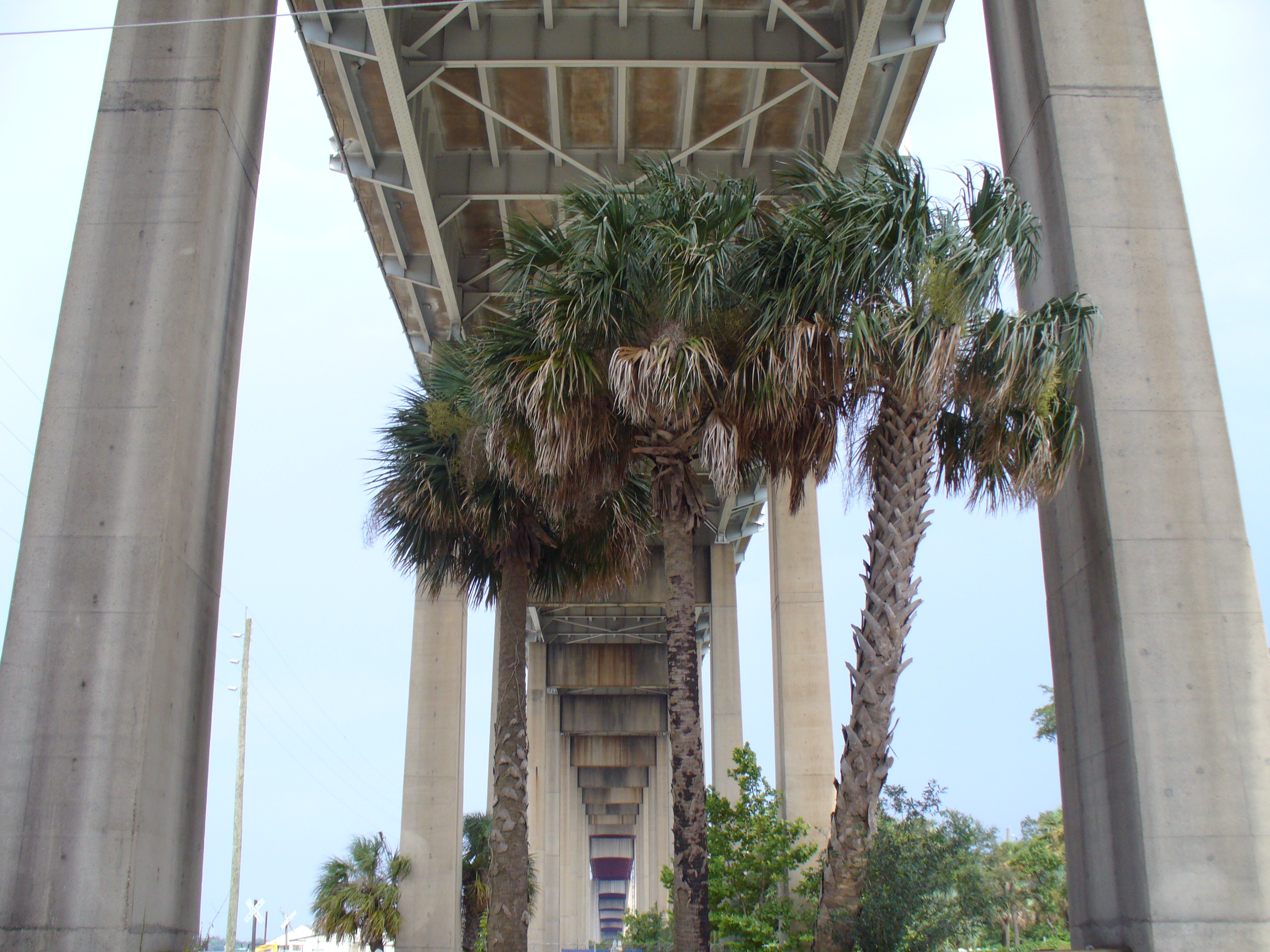
A shot looking below the Mathews Bridge

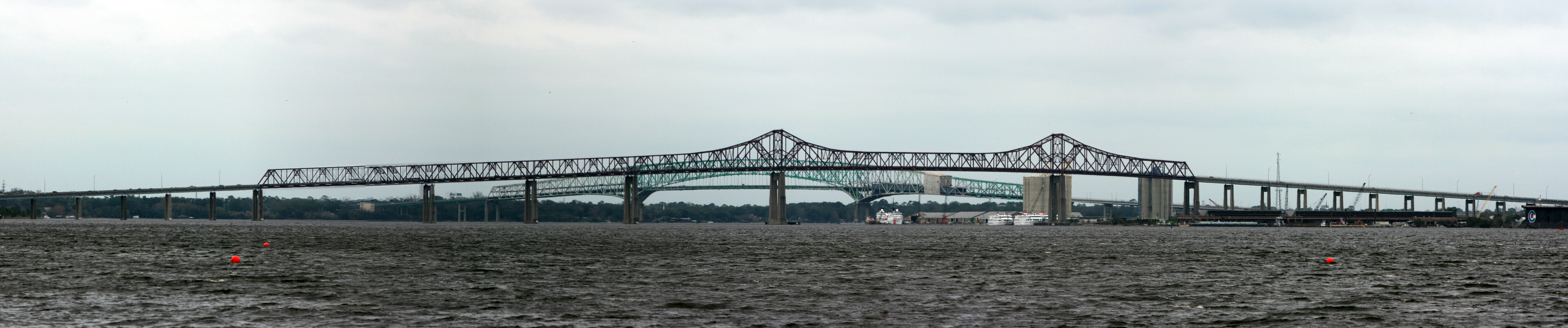
Picture of the Mathews Bridge from across the water.

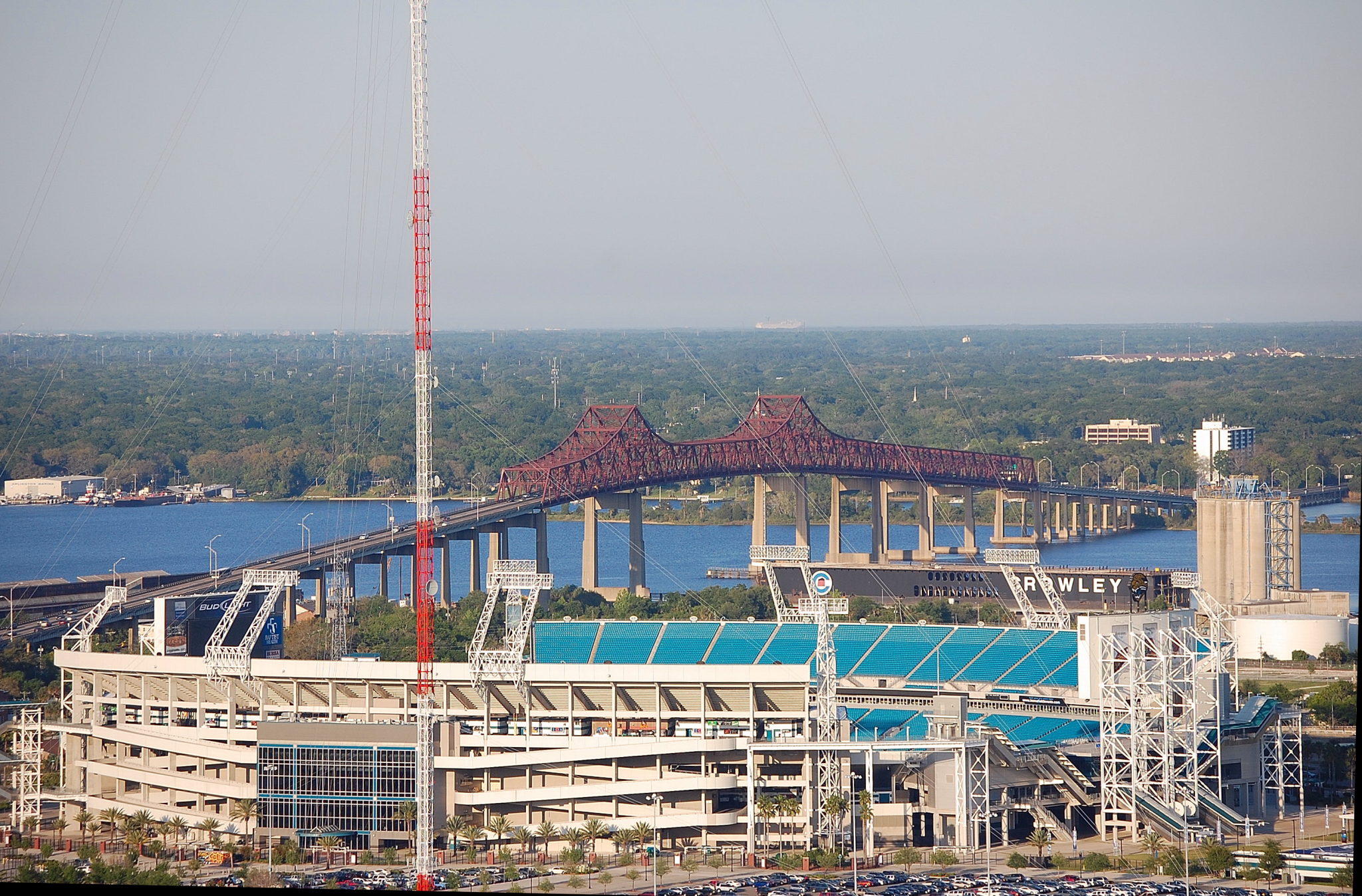
EverBank Stadium with the Mathews Bridge in the background.

== In popular culture ==
- The Mathews Bridge is referenced in "My Generation" by Limp Bizkit, who started out in Jacksonville.

== See also ==
- List of crossings of the St. Johns River
