= Florida State Road 122 =

Florida state highway in Jacksonville, Duval County, Florida

State Road 122
- Florida State Road 122 highlighted in red

Route information
- Maintained by FDOT
- Length: 1.070 mi (1.722 km)

Major junctions
- West end: I-95 in Jacksonville
- SR 117 in Jacksonville
- East end: US 17 in Jacksonville

Location
- Country: United States
- State: Florida
- Counties: Duval

Highway system
- Florida State Highway System; Interstate; US; State; Former; Pre‑1945; Toll; Scenic
| ← SR 121 | → SR 123 |

State Road 122 (SR 122), mostly known as Golfair Boulevard, is a 1.070-mile-long (1.722 km) east-west state highway located entirely within Jacksonville, Duval County, Florida. It is almost entirely within the Brentwood neighborhood.

== Route description ==
SR 122 begins at exit 355 on Interstate 95 (I-95). From there, it runs east for a short length before intersecting with SR 117. After that, it turns southeastwardly towards the intersection with North Pearl Avenue where it becomes West 27th Street and continues along that street until its terminus at US Highway 17 (US 17). East 27th Street continues for several blocks as a local city street.

== Major intersections ==
The entire route is in Jacksonville, Duval County.

| mi | km | Destinations | Notes |
|---|---|---|---|
| 0.0 | 0.0 | I-95 (SR 9) – Daytona Beach, Savannah | Western terminus; I-95 exit 355 |
| 0.2 | 0.32 | SR 117 north (Brentwood Avenue) | Southern terminus of SR 117 |
| 1.07 | 1.72 | US 17 (SR 5 / Main Street) | Eastern terminus |
1.000 mi = 1.609 km; 1.000 km = 0.621 mi
