= Charles E. Bennett Memorial Bridge =

Bridge in Florida, United States

Coordinates: 30.3611°N 81.4423°W

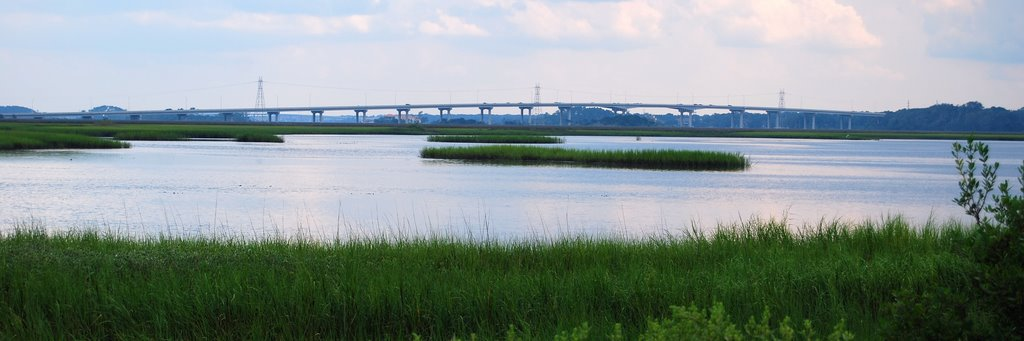
Charles E. Bennett Memorial Bridge

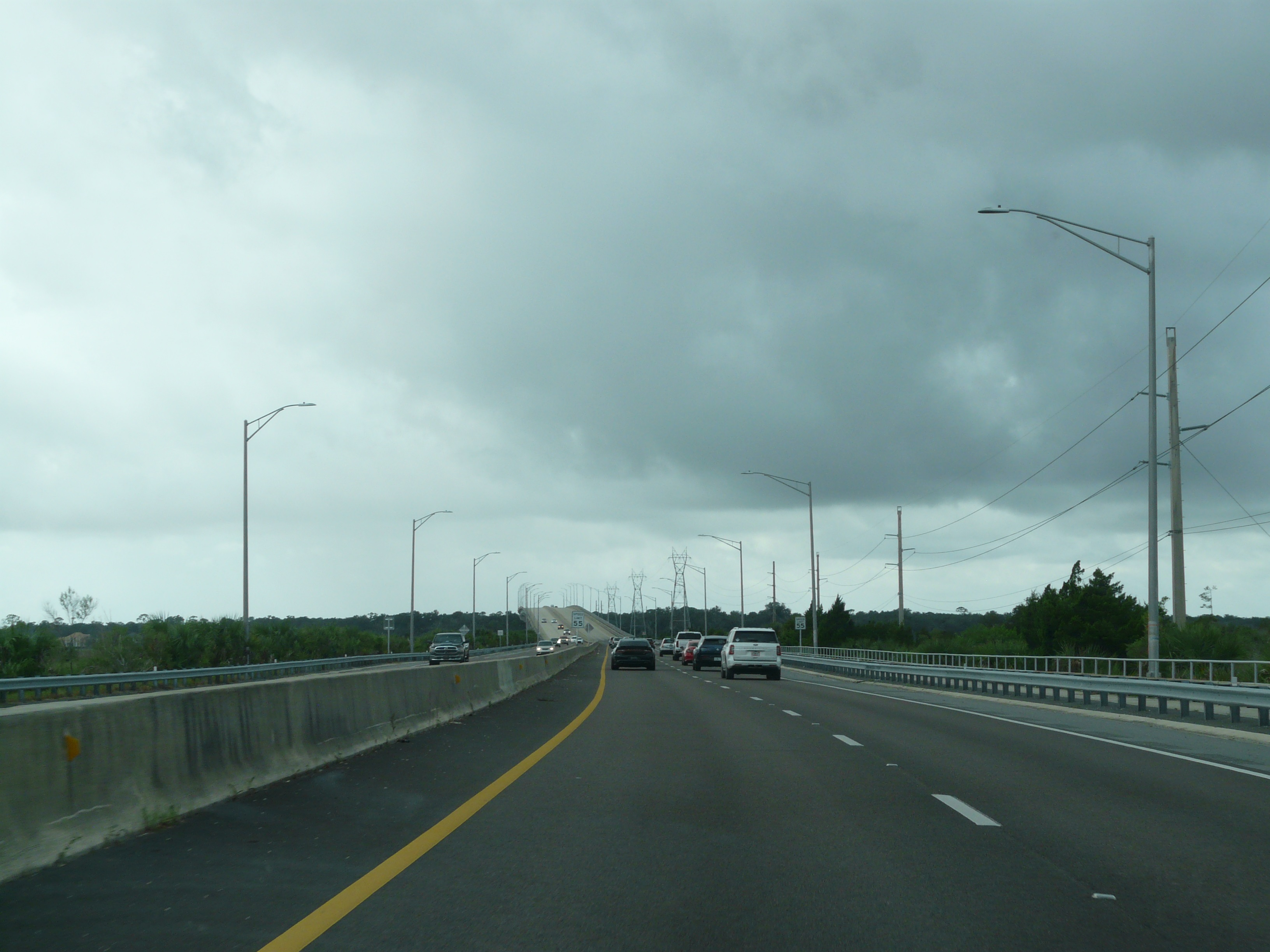
Westbound on the bridge

The Charles E. Bennett Memorial Bridge carries Florida State Road 116 traffic over the Intracoastal Waterway south of the St. Johns River in Jacksonville, Florida. It was named for Charles Edward Bennett, a member of the United States House of Representatives from Florida who was involved in the creation of Mayport Naval Station. The bridge is commonly referred to as the Wonderwood Bridge, as the bridge is located on Wonderwood Drive.

== History ==
In 1997, the Jacksonville Transportation Authority (JTA) and City Council voted to build the Wonderwood Connector. Construction began on the bridge in May 2001 and was projected to be completed in November 2003. In August 2003, engineers determined that an uncompleted portion of the bridge would be too low for a Coast Guard permit, and construction was halted in November 2003. The bridge was completed on July 24, 2004. The bridge was the linchpin of a $122 million project for a connector that began in 1987. The connector, Florida State Road 116, was completed in June 2009. State Road 116 connects Mayport Naval Station and the beaches communities with the mainland. The cost of the bridge was $36.5 million.

== Delays ==
In August 2003 engineers calculated that the center span of the bridge would not be high enough for a Coast Guard permit. The permit required a height of 65 feet above the waterway, however, the bridge would be a few inches too short to qualify for the permit. In November 2003, the JTA worked with Jacobs Civil on a design that would meet the requirements for the permit. The new completion date was projected for July 2004. Jacksonville Transportation officials stated that sorting out who was responsible for the construction delays could take months or even years; however, the completion of the bridge was delayed only 7 months from the initial completion date of November 2003. The cause of the height issue was the JTA's opting for a design that planned for a height of 65 feet 2.25 inches. JTA Deputy Executive Director Matt Dominy stated that the agency had initially planned for a height of 67 to 68 feet but went with the lower height due to costs.

== Details ==
The Charles E. Bennett Memorial Bridge is a four-lane bridge that connects Arlington to Mayport Road. Traffic each way is 10,500 vehicles per day. The bridge is not eligible for the National Register of Historic Places. According to National Bridge Inventory Condition Ratings, the bridge is rated as in good condition.
