= Hanna Park =

Park in Florida, United States

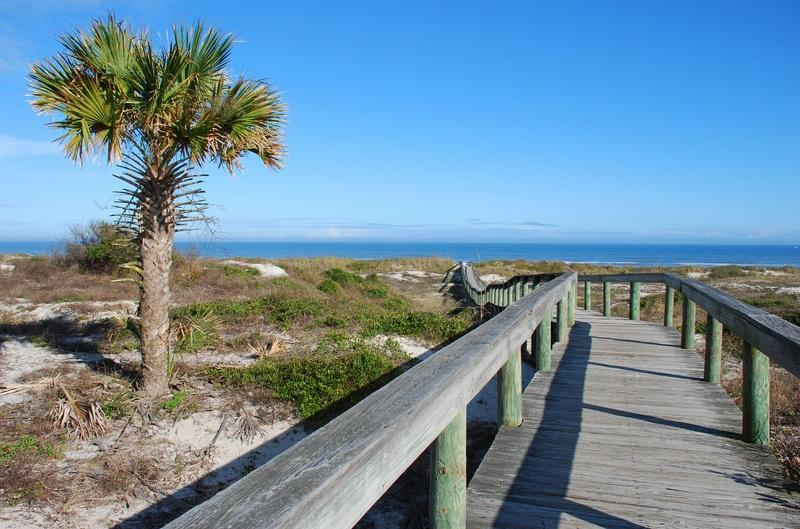
- Hanna Park boardwalk across dunes
- Interactive map of Hanna Park
- Type: Municipal (Parks & Recreation Department)
- Location: Jacksonville, Florida
- Coordinates: 30.37134°N 81.40722°W
- Area: 447 acres (181 ha)
- Created: 1967
- Operator: City of Jacksonville
- Visitors: 400,000

Kathryn Abbey Hanna Park is a 1.5-mile (2.4 km) public beach and city park in Jacksonville, Florida. It is located at Mayport in the Jacksonville Beaches area. It consists of 447 acres (1.81 km^{2}) of mature coastal hammock, which is increasingly rare along Florida's heavily developed Atlantic coast.

== History ==
Part of what is now Hanna Park was formerly Manhattan Beach, Florida's first beach community for African Americans during the period of segregation in the United States. The area was intended for use by African American employees of the Florida East Coast Railway and hotels. African American entrepreneurs Mack Wilson and William Middleton, among others, contributed to making Manhattan Beach a destination for many African Americans in the South. At its height the beach included amenities such as picnic pavilions, cottages, and an amusement park. It flourished until 1932, when the East Coast Railway stopped serving its Jacksonville to northern Mayport route, ultimately preventing convenient access to the area for travelers. Around 1940, it was superseded as a day-trip destination by the larger American Beach in nearby Amelia Island.

In 1967, 5 acres (20,000 m^{2}) of land for the park was donated by Winthrop Bancroft, who required that the land be named for Kathryn Abbey Hanna (November 8, 1895 – 1967), a Chicago-born educator and author who had settled in Florida and served on the Board of Parks and Historic Memorials. Hanna taught at Florida State College for Women. She also wrote a history of the state titled Florida, Land of Change.

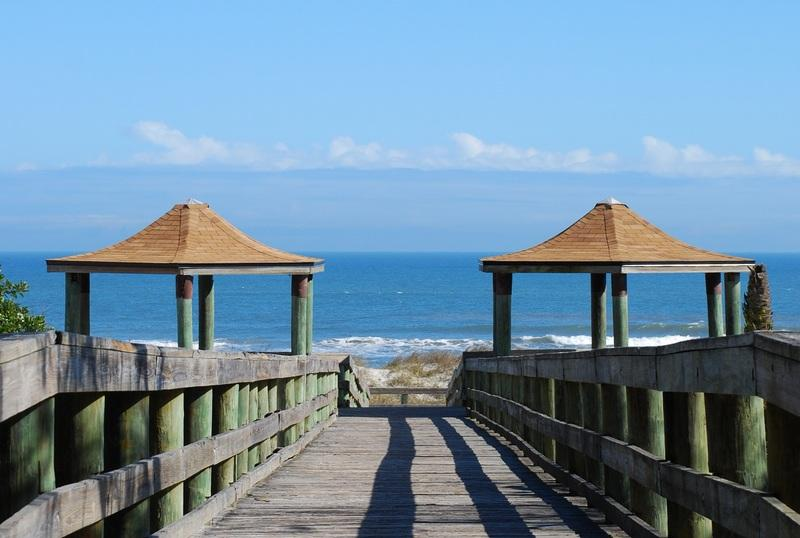
Shelters on the boardwalk

Following the Jacksonville Consolidation, the area became part of Jacksonville. The city purchased the surrounding property in the 1970s during the administration of Mayor Hans Tanzler, expanding the park. The first general purpose trail was constructed by Michael Long in 1987 as his Eagle Scout service project. Most of the land has been left in its natural, wooded state. Boardwalks were constructed over the dunes to protect vegetation.

== Features ==
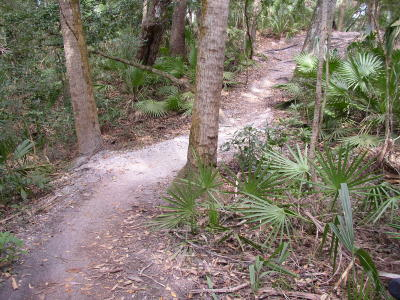
Mountain bike trails

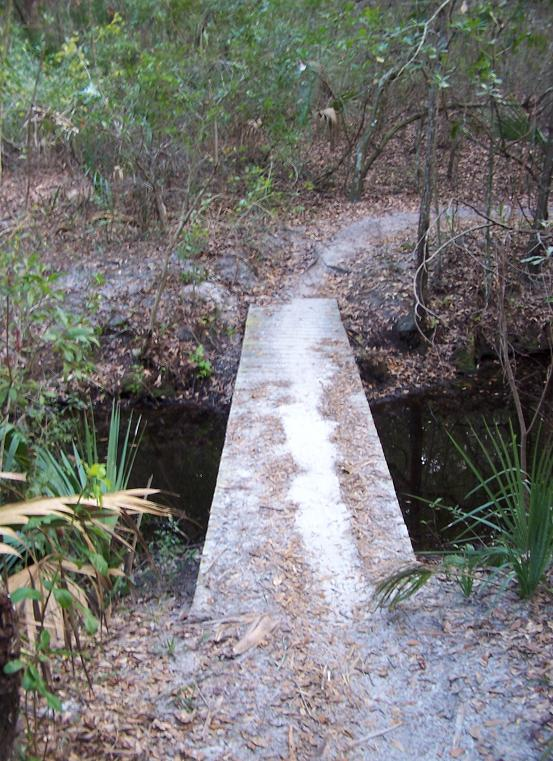
Trail bridge

In addition to the white sand beach on the Atlantic Ocean, the park offers:

Offroad bike trails

The park has nearly 15 miles (24 km) of bicycle trails that range from easy to difficult. For experienced riders, trails named Grunt, Misery, and Tornado Alley offer a challenging workout. Sanctioned races are held on a seasonal schedule and many local cyclists ride the trails on a daily basis. This trail wins the award for "Most Difficult Close to the Sea" and was rated four out of five stars on the Trails website.

Campground

Almost 300 campsites are nestled in the woods along winding, paved roads for tent camping or RV use, and there are six small log "cozy cabins".

Dolphin Plaza

The park has a beachfront facility that can be rented by groups, with a view of sand dunes and surf.

Freshwater lake

A former borrow pit for road construction in the park was turned into a 40-acre (160,000 m^{2}) freshwater lake which opened in 1978. Activities available include fishing, kayaking, paddle boating, and canoeing. Lakeside picnic tables and grills are available, and scenic trails surround the lake. A water playground is provided for small children.

Other amenities

There is a visitor/interpretive center and shuffleboard and volleyball courts. Throughout the park are benches, grills, picnic shelters & tables, playground equipment, restrooms, and trash barrels.
