= Jacksonville Beaches =

The Beaches Jacksonville Beaches, Jax Beaches
- Region of Jacksonville
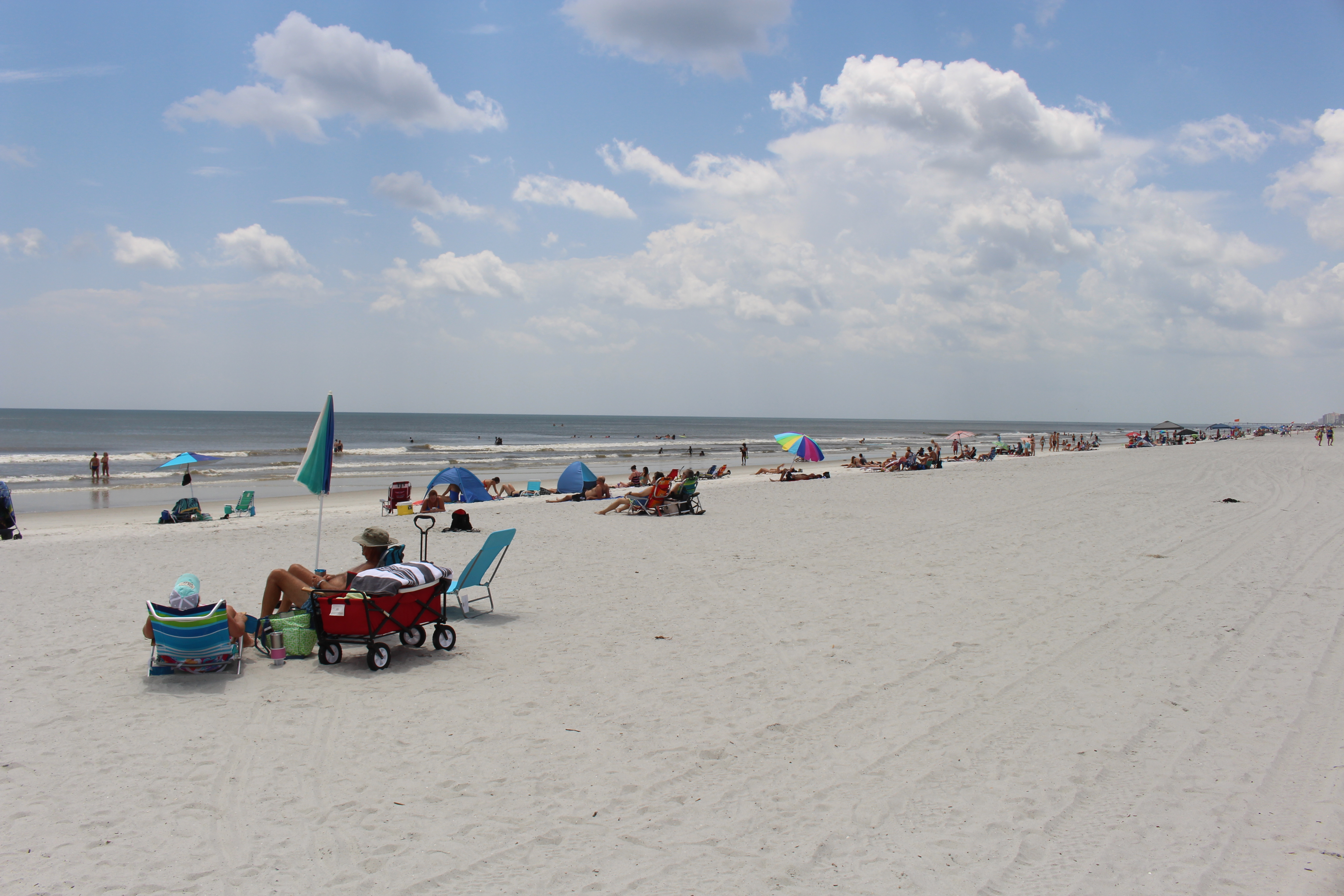
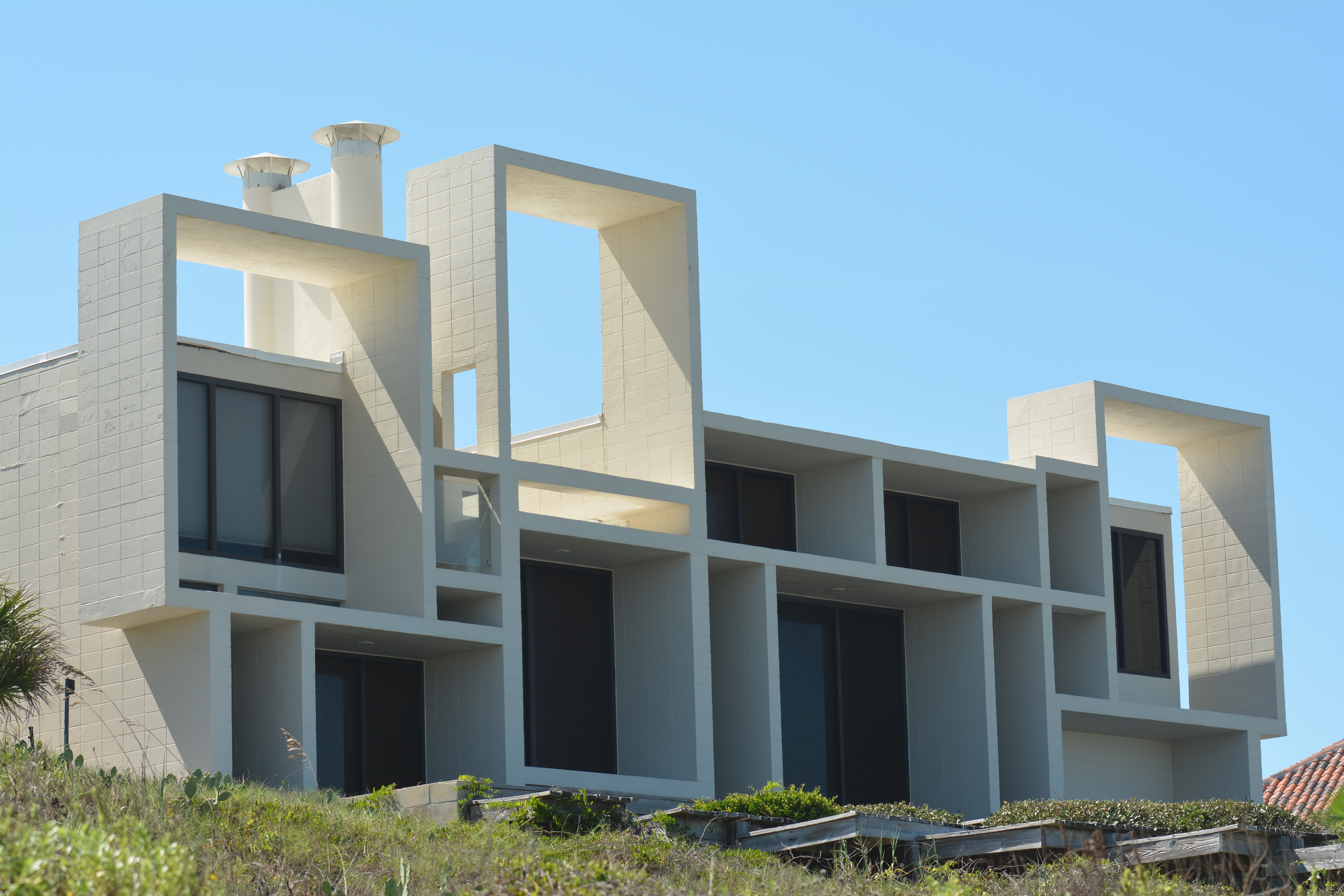
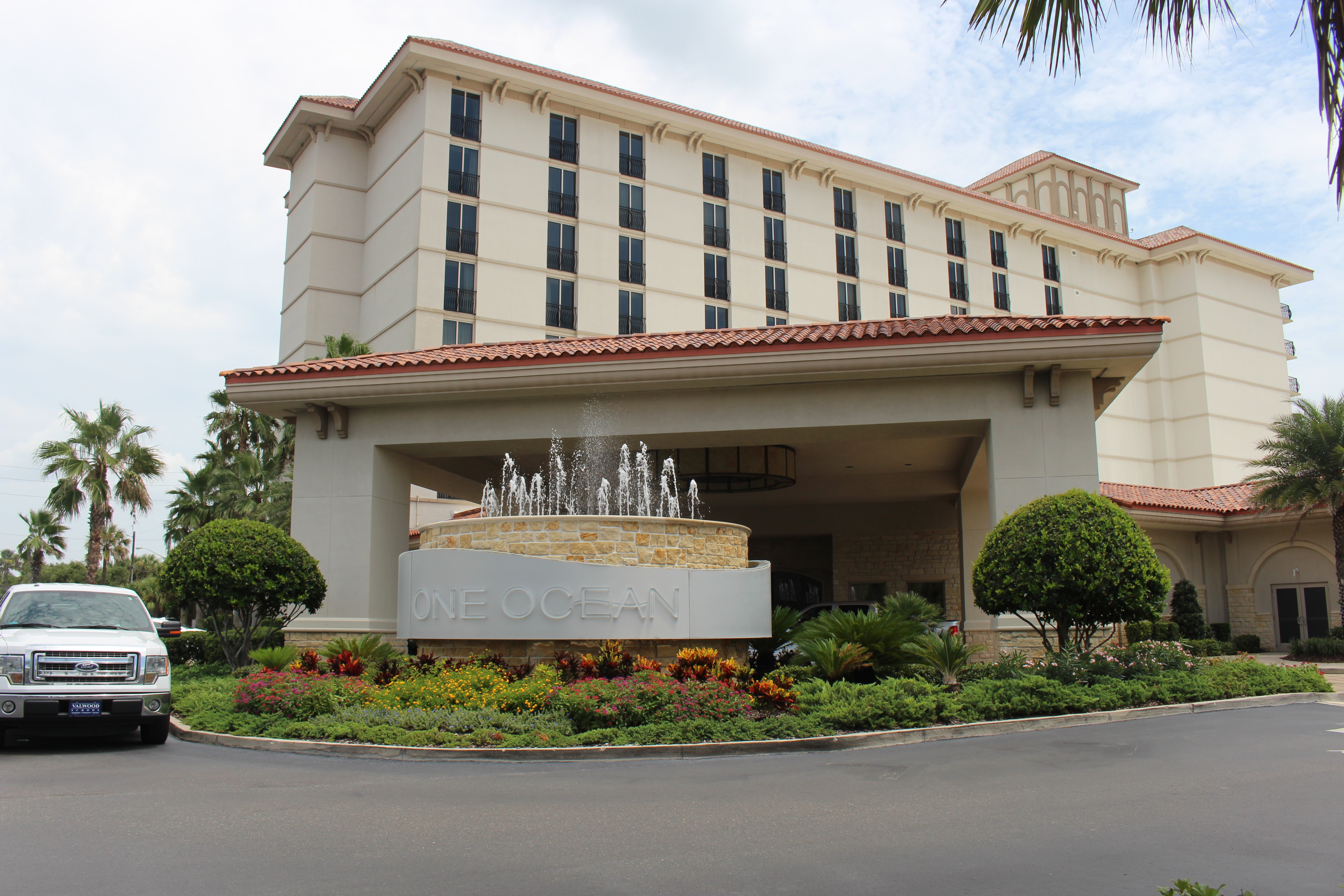
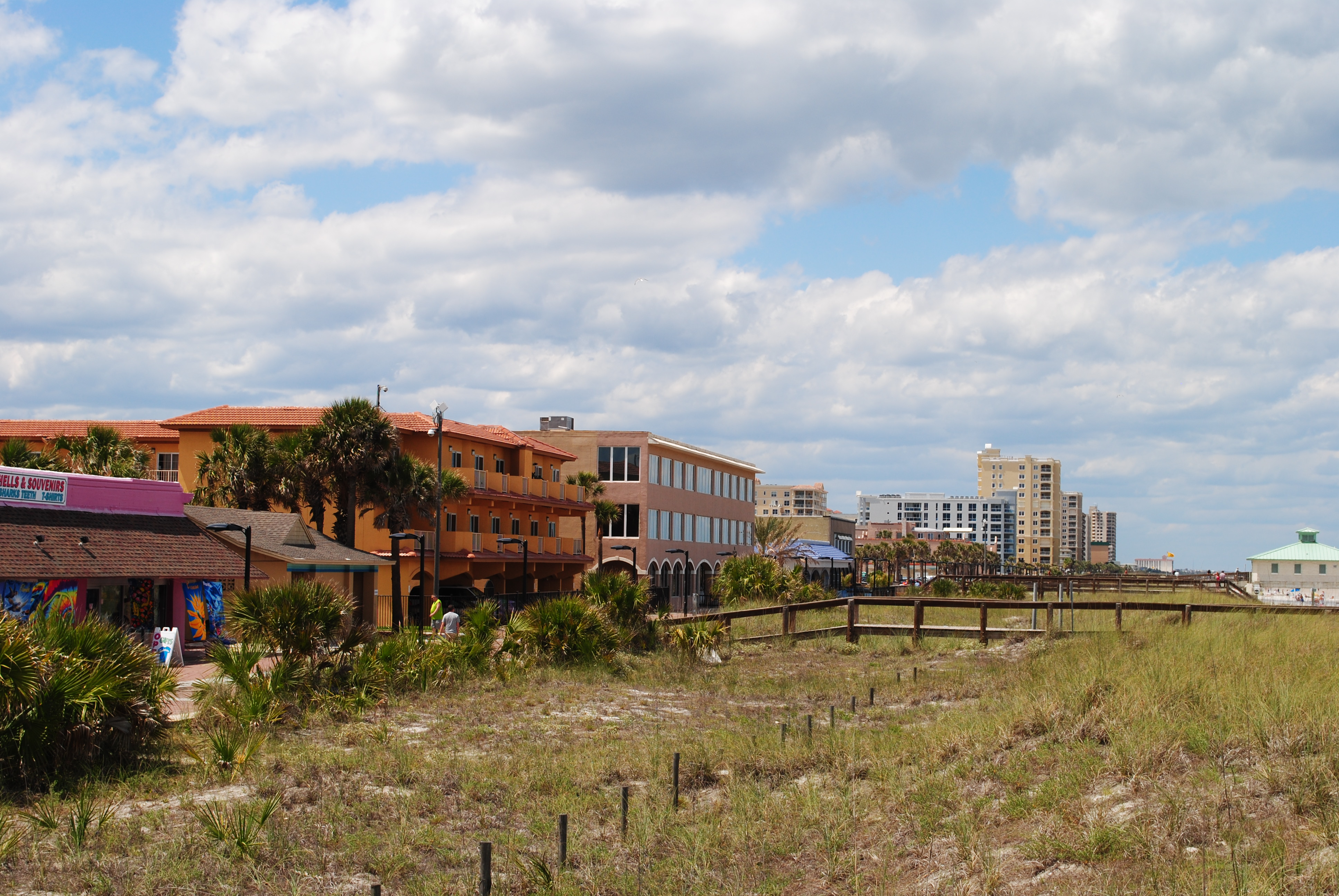
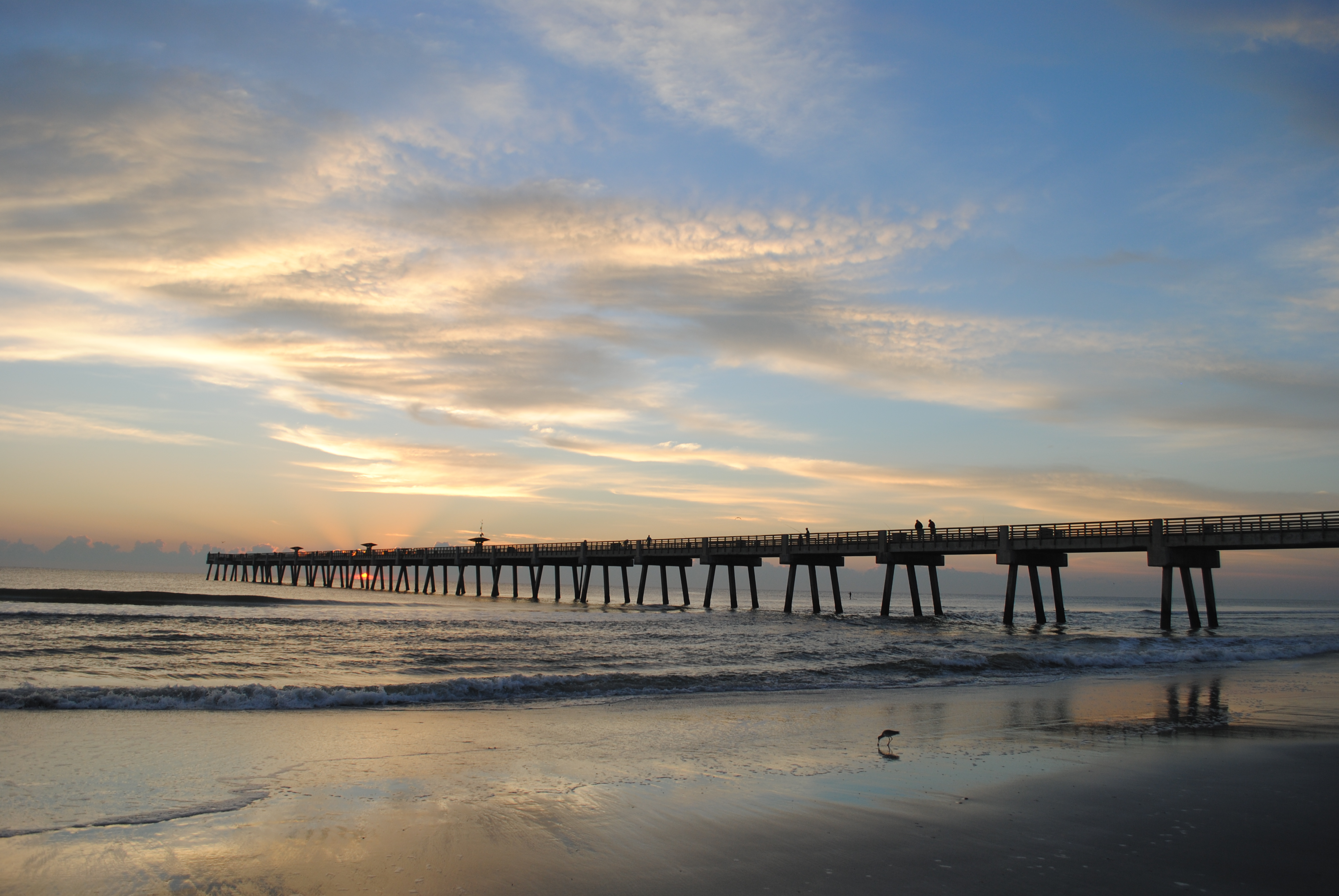
- from the left, Neptune Beach, Milam House in Ponte Vedra Beach, One Ocean Resort in Atlantic Beach, Boardwalk at Jacksonville Beach, and the Jacksonville Beach Pier

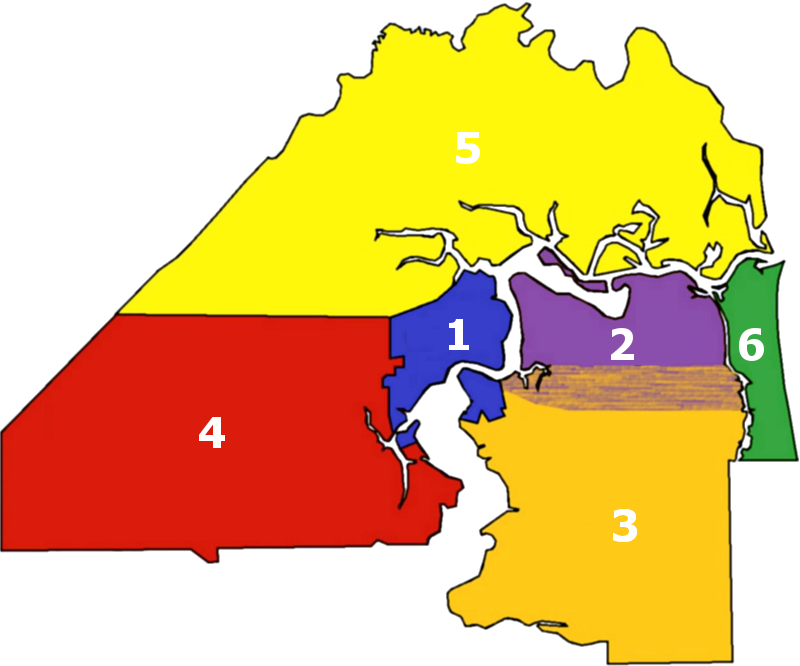
- Vernacular regions of Jacksonville: 1. Urban core; 2. Arlington; 3. Southside; 4. Westside; 5. Northside; 6. Beaches
- Coordinates: 30.3°N 81.4°W
- Country: United States
- State: Florida
- Counties: Duval; St. Johns

Population (2010)
  - Total: 87,525
- ZIP Code: 32082, 32227, 32228, 32233, 32250, 32266
- Area code(s): 904, 324

The Jacksonville Beaches, or Jax Beaches known locally as "The Beaches", are a group of towns and communities on the northern half of San Pablo Island on the US state of Florida's First Coast. These communities are separated from the main body of the city of Jacksonville by the Intracoastal Waterway. The Jacksonville Beaches are located in Duval and northern St. Johns counties, and make up part of the Jacksonville metropolitan area. The main communities generally identified as part of the Beaches are Mayport, Atlantic Beach, Neptune Beach, Jacksonville Beach, and Ponte Vedra Beach.

== Area ==
The Jacksonville Beaches communities are all located on San Pablo Island, a 37-mile barrier island defined by the Atlantic Ocean to the east, the St. Johns River to the north, and the Intracoastal Waterway to the west. The island was actually originally a peninsula until 1912, when a 10-mile channel was dug connecting the San Pablo and Tolomato Rivers, facilitating the Intracoastal Waterway and separating the land from the mainland. The island had no official name until local advocates encouraged the adoption of "San Pablo Island" to encourage tourism and regional identification. The Jacksonville City Council voted on October 23, 2012 to officially name the island, a century after its creation.

The northernmost of the beach communities is Mayport, in Duval County. Since the consolidation of the Jacksonville and Duval County governments in 1968, Mayport has been within the city limits of Jacksonville. Most of Mayport is currently occupied by Naval Station Mayport, a major U.S. Navy base, itself also entirely located within the city of Jacksonville. Moving south along the coastline are three incorporated towns, also within Duval County: Atlantic Beach, Neptune Beach, and Jacksonville Beach. All three maintain their own municipal governments, however, residents receive county-level services from Jacksonville and vote for Jacksonville's mayor and City Council. Continuing south into St. Johns County is Ponte Vedra Beach. Typically, only the communities on the northern part of the island are considered the Beaches; areas to the south such as Vilano Beach are usually not included. The Palm Valley area of St. Johns County, much of which is also located on the island, is sometimes considered part of the Beaches.

The parts of Duval County on the other side of the Intracoastal are sometimes known as the West Beaches. Further inland are Jacksonville's Arlington and Southside areas.

== History ==
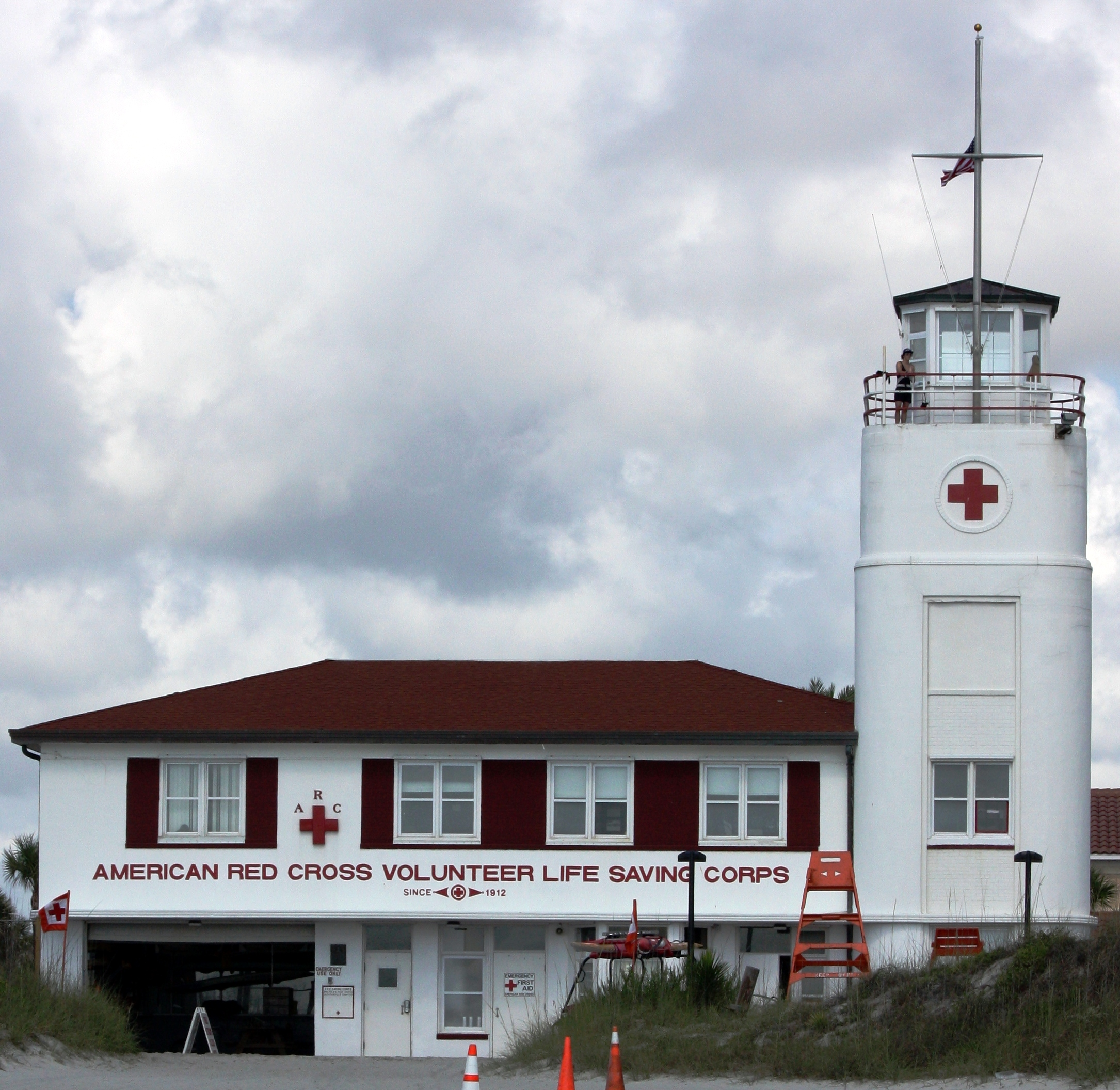
American Red Cross Volunteer Life Saving Corps Station

The first inhabitants of the Jacksonville Beaches area were Native Americans. Like most of the Jacksonville area, the region was inhabited by the Timucua people at the time of European contact.

Mayport was the first part of the beaches to see any concentrated population growth, when a small community of fishermen and river pilots grew up there, especially following the U.S. purchase of Florida in 1821. However, the entire Beaches area remained very sparsely populated until the end of the 19th century, when they were developed as resorts. Jacksonville Beach, originally known as Ruby and then as Pablo Beach, grew around the series of luxury hotels built in the area. Further growth was facilitated by the Jacksonville and Atlantic Railroad connecting the town to Jacksonville. Atlantic Beach also grew as a resort community around a large hotel, and smaller hotels were built at Mayport. Neptune Beach seceded from Jacksonville Beach in 1931 and incorporated as its own town.

Ponte Vedra Beach and Palm Valley remained much more rustic into the 20th century. Palm Valley, especially, mostly consisted of farmland. In 1914 mineral deposits were discovered at Ponte Vedra, after which point it grew as the town of Mineral City. Following World War I real estate development began in the area and the name was changed to Ponte Vedra Beach.

Growth on north San Pablo Island was facilitated by roads and bridges built over time to connect it with Jacksonville on the mainland, beginning with Atlantic Blvd in the early 1900s, Beach Blvd (which was constructed on the railway bed of the former Jacksonville and Atlantic Railroad) in the late 1940s, the Butler Blvd expressway in the late 1980s, and finally, the Wonderwood Connector completed in the mid 2000s.

== Governance ==
Relations between the Beaches and the Jacksonville city government have at times been tense. The three incorporated towns in Duval County have fought with the city over the ways taxes and government services are shared; this led to a lawsuit in 1979, which established an interlocal agreement. The Beaches governments took up a second lawsuit in 1993 alleging a breach of the agreement, and members of the Jacksonville City Council sought to review the charter in 2006, angering locals. During much of this time the Beaches threatened forming their own county, "Ocean County", though this was resolved following the election of Neptune Beach resident John Delaney as Mayor of Jacksonville in 1995.

== See also ==
- Jacksonville Consolidation
