= Atlantic Boulevard (Jacksonville) =

- West end: San Marco Boulevard in San Marco, Jacksonville
- East end: Beaches Town Centre on Atlantic Beach-Neptune Beach border

Atlantic Boulevard is a highway in Duval County, Florida, that forms the easternmost portion of State Road 10 (SR 10) and is also part of U.S. Route 90 (US 90).

Atlantic Boulevard connects the mainland portion of the city of Jacksonville with the Jacksonville Beaches on a barrier island to the east. Its western terminus is at San Marco Square in the San Marco neighborhood, at an intersection with the northern terminus of Balis Place, where the roadway continues as San Marco Boulevard; it travels to the east to the Atlantic Ocean at the Jacksonville Beaches, forming the city line between Atlantic Beach on its north side and Neptune Beach on its south side. Its eastern terminus is just to the east of a roundabout with the northern terminus of Midway Street on the city line.

== History ==
Atlantic Boulevard was first planned circa 1890 by Eugene F. Gilbert, a jeweler from Connecticut who had purchased oceanfront property and envisioned a wagon road between the former city of South Jacksonville and the Jacksonville Beaches. Gilbert paid for land surveys and eventually convinced the Duval County Commission to use convict labor to start building the road, but a new set of county commissioners terminated the effort when the project was about two-thirds complete.

The editor of the Jacksonville Evening Telegram published that it was hoped the county commissioners would improve the road and not leave it merely as an opening cut through the woods.

The road was eventually completed in 1910, after the arrival of the automobile. It was Florida's first modern "improved" highway and is considered to have been the beginning of the state's highway system. Its dedication on July 28, 1910, was celebrated with parades and auto races.

The original road was 18 feet (5.5 m) wide, which was soon criticized as being too narrow for the large amount of traffic that the popular road carried between the mainland and the beach. Road surfacing materials used on different sections of the boulevard included shell, concrete, asphalt macadam, and brick laid over a base of sandy soil. The brick sections rapidly became rough and wavy as heavy traffic caused shifting of the bricks and the underlying sand. Just five years after completion of the boulevard, the brick sections were expected to require resurfacing with a more durable material such as concrete.

In 2001, the road is now a six-lane divided highway for most of its length, and the bridges on it were rebuilt. In 2008, traffic counts at locations along Atlantic Boulevard ranged from 26,000 to 61,000 vehicles per day.

== See also ==
- Transportation in Jacksonville, Florida
