= Northside (Jacksonville) =

Region of Jacksonville, Florida, US

Northside North Jacksonville
- Region of Jacksonville
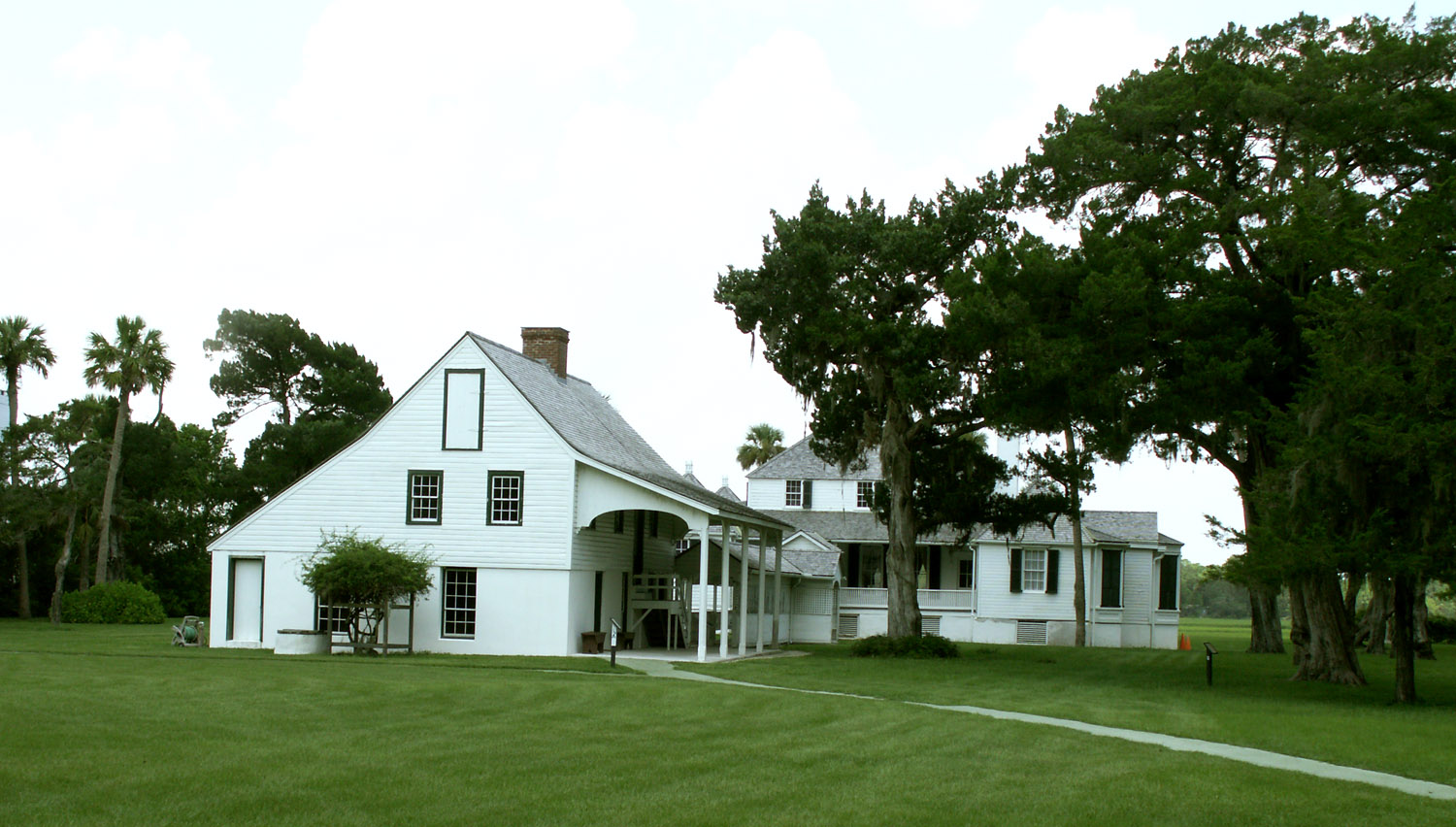
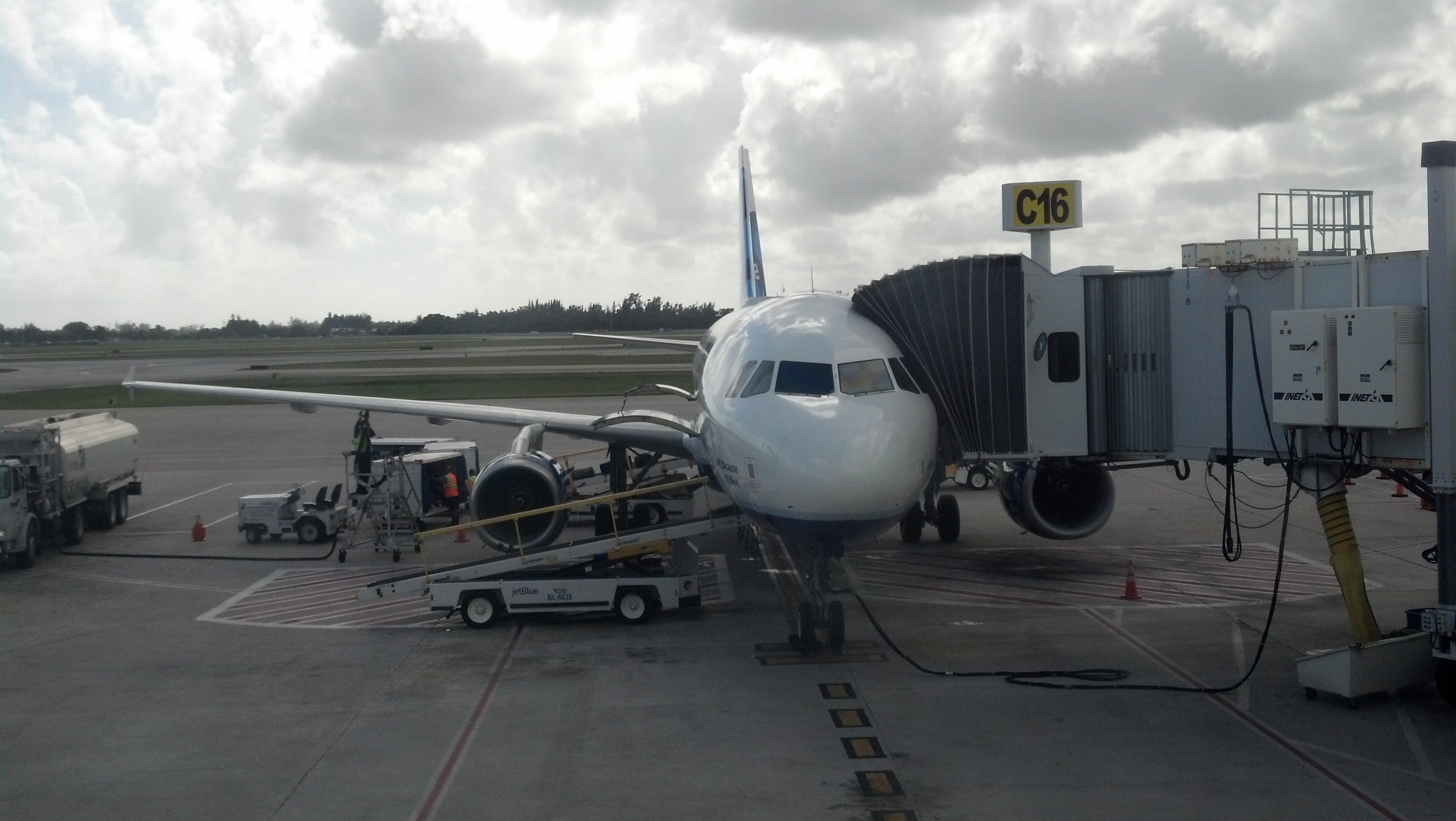
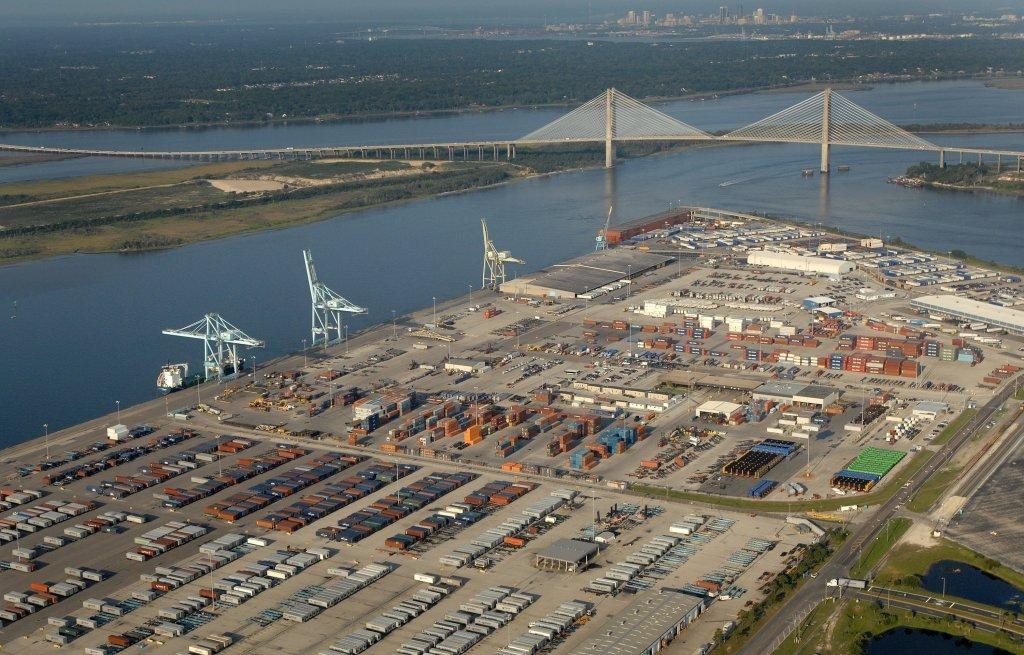
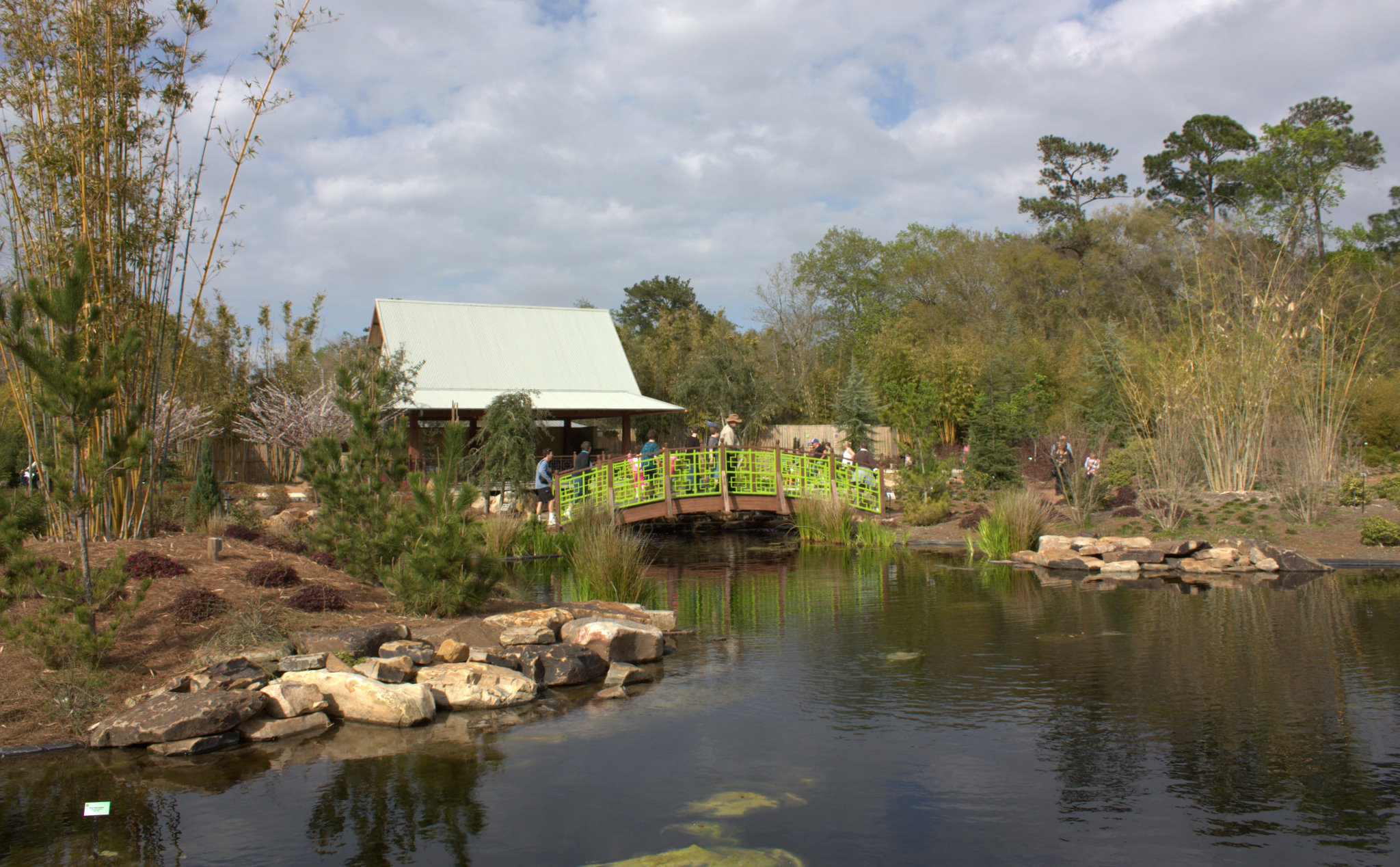
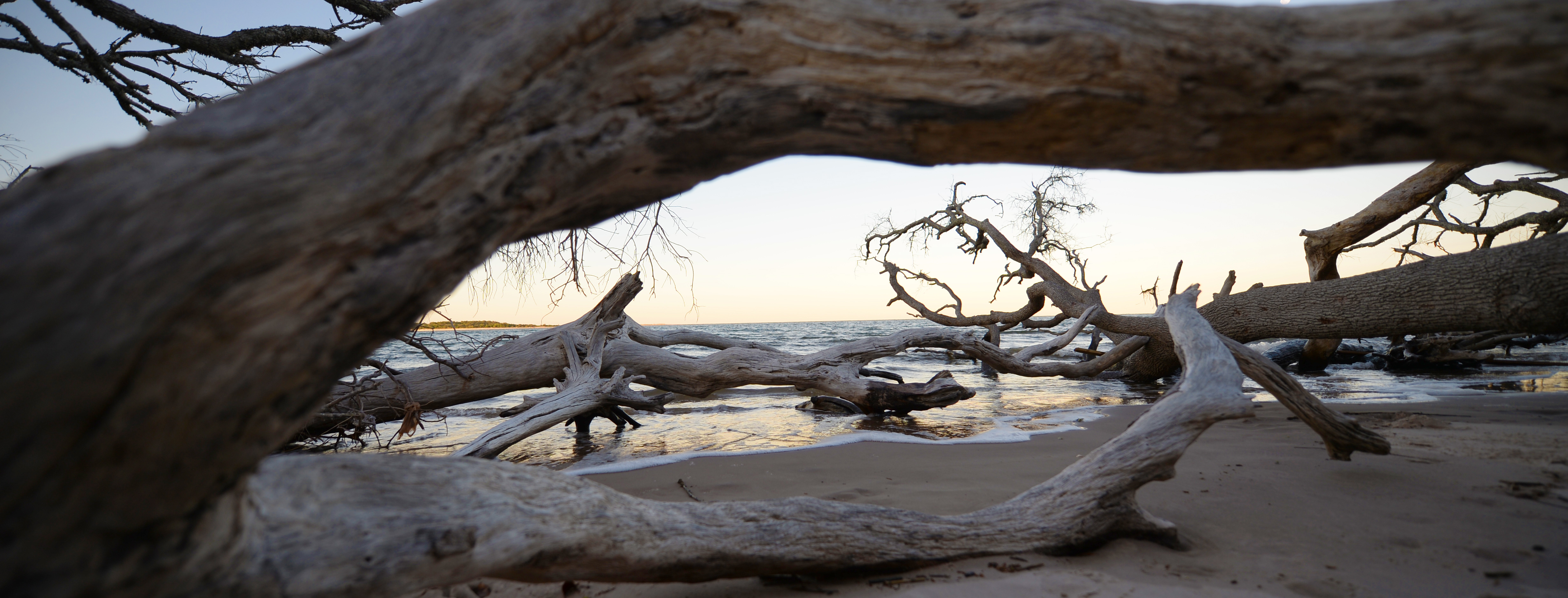
- from the left, Blount Island Marine Terminal, Jacksonville Zoo Asian Bamboo Garden, Kingsley Plantation, Jacksonville International Airport and Big Talbot Island.

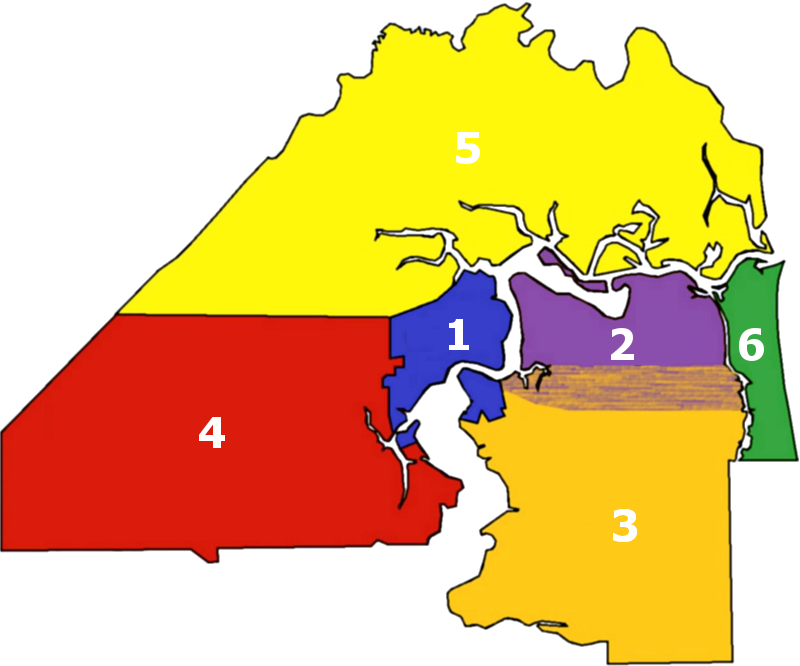
- Vernacular regions of Jacksonville: 1. Urban core; 2. Arlington; 3. Southside; 4. Westside; 5. Northside; 6. Beaches
- Coordinates: 30.45940°N 81.64988°W
- Country: United States
- State: Florida
- City: Jacksonville

Government
  - Florida House: Reggie Fullwood; Tracie Davis
  - Florida Senate: Aaron Bean; Audrey Gibson
  - U.S. House: Al Lawson (D)

Population (2017)
  - Total: 156,001
- ZIP Code: 32208, 32209, 32218, 32219, 32226
- Area code(s): 904, 324

The Northside is a large region of Jacksonville, Florida, and is generally understood as a counterpart to the city's other large regions, the Urban Core, Arlington, Southside, Westside, and the Beaches. The expansive area consists of historic communities, cultural landmarks, protected ecosystems and vital transportation and logistics facilities, all fundamental to the history and development of Jacksonville.

The Northside was incorporated into the city in 1968 as a result the Jacksonville Consolidation, a city-county consolidation of the governments of the City of Jacksonville and Duval County. The area houses a sizable share of the city's transportation and logistics infrastructure, including Jacksonville International Airport, Jacksonville station, JAXPORT Cruise Terminal, Blount Island Marine Terminal and Dames Point Marine Terminal. The area is also home to the Jacksonville Zoo and Gardens, which relocated to the Northside in 1925 and has since doubled in size. There is no consistent definition for what constitute the boundaries of the Northside, but studies have revealed the vernacular region to be considered roughly north of the Urban Core and Westside at 20th Street, and west and north of the St. Johns River.

== History ==
The Northside area has yielded some of the oldest known pottery from what is now the United States, uncovered by a University of North Florida team on Black Hammock Island in the Timucuan Ecological and Historic Preserve. The team also excavated more recent artifacts contemporary with the Mocama chiefdoms and some that indicate a Spanish mission. Archaeological research dates human habitation in the area eventually known as the Mocama Province to at least 2500 BC.

Established near the mouth of the St. Johns River, on Fort George Island, San Juan del Puerto was a Spanish Franciscan mission, founded some time before 1587. It was founded to serve the Saturiwa, a Timucua tribe who lived in the area. It has an important place in the study of the Timucua, as the place where Father Francisco Pareja undertook his work on the Timucua language. He devised a system of writing for Timucuan and taught some of the Mocama. In 1612, he printed a catechism in Spanish and Timucua, the first book printed in an indigenous language of the Americas. This became one of the three principal missions in what the Spanish called the Mocama Province, together with San Pedro de Mocama (serving the Tacatacuru chiefdom) on Cumberland Island and Santa Maria de Sena between them on Amelia Island. After 1650, Guale refugees from the next chiefdom to the north along the (present-day) Georgia coast were settled at the mission. The Spanish abandoned the mission around 1702, partly in response to raids from Native Americans and allied English colonists from South Carolina during Queen Anne's War.

The United Kingdom took ownership of Florida in 1763, and quickly established several plantations in the region. Richard Hazard owned the first plantation on Fort George Island in 1765, harvesting indigo with several dozen enslaved Africans. Spain regained ownership of Florida in 1783 after the American Revolution and recruited new Americans with promises of free land. In 1793, American Revolution veteran John McQueen was lured to Fort George Island from South Carolina by the Spanish government, which rewarded McQueen with the island. McQueen settled with 300 slaves and constructed a large house, but was soon bankrupt due to misfortunes. Possession of the plantation turned over to John McIntosh from Georgia, who revived it in 1804. McIntosh, however, took a leading role in an insurgency attempting to annex Florida into the United States. Unsuccessful, McIntosh fled back into Georgia to escape punishment from the Spanish. Zephaniah Kingsley settled on Fort George Island in 1814, after leasing the estate from McIntosh. He purchased the land and buildings for $7,000 in 1817. Today, it is now known as Kingsley Plantation. Free blacks and several private owners lived at the plantation until it was transferred to the State of Florida in 1955. It was acquired by the National Park Service in 1991. The main house, kitchen and numerous slave quarters have survived.

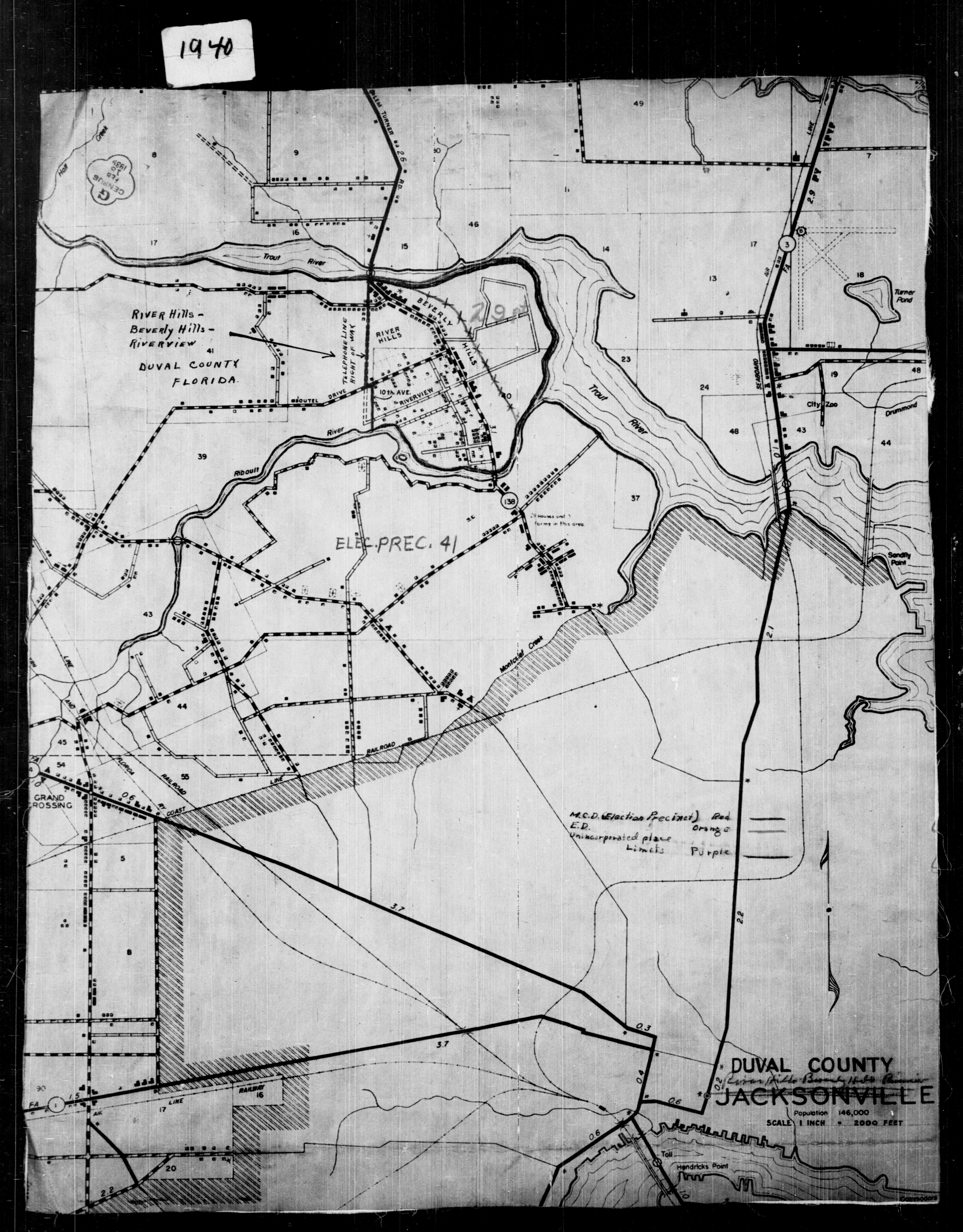
1940 Census Enumeration District Map of the Riverview neighborhood, and the surrounding communities

The Northside began to grow as a suburb of Jacksonville in the 19th century. Although the site of East Florida's first steam-powered sawmill, completed in 1828, major growth in Panama Park only came after 1905. In 1915, a new school was constructed, notably designed by architect Henry J. Klutho. By 1931, Panama Park was annexed by Jacksonville. Tallulah-North Shore, a neighborhood adjacent to Panama Park, was first platted in 1879. The area was annexed by Jacksonville in 1925. Riverview is a neighborhood bordered by the Trout River to the North and East, Ribault River to the South, and Ribault Ave to the West. Riverview was originally platted in 1911 by Dr. E.H. Armstrong. Dr. Armstrong also converted his 25-acre waterfront home property into Riverview Tropical Gardens, an attraction with boating, fishing and garden trails of roses, azaleas, and lilies. In 1979, the city purchased the land and converted the property into a public park. On July 19, 1925, the Jacksonville Zoo and Gardens moved to a 37.5-acre (152,000 m^{2}) site on the Trout River, off Heckscher Drive. The zoo had formerly operated in the Springfield neighborhood since May 12, 1914.

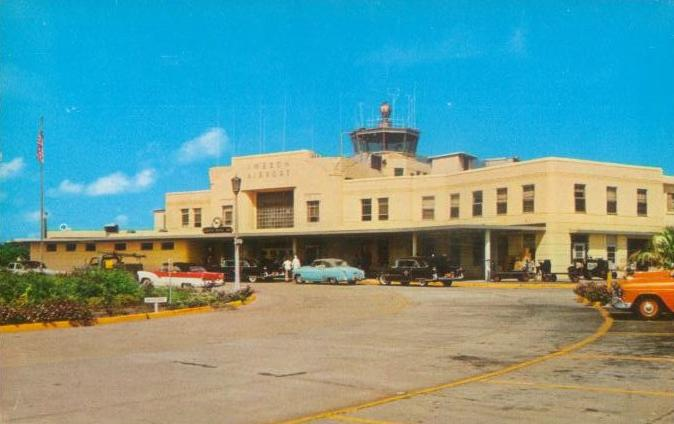
Imeson Airport

The Jacksonville Municipal Airport opened on October 11, 1927, at the intersection of North Main Street (U.S. 17) and Busch Drive. The dedication ceremony was notably attended by Charles Lindbergh, who flew to Jacksonville in the "Spirit of St. Louis" to promote the new airport. Eastern Air Service (later known as Eastern Air Lines) was the first passenger airline to service Jacksonville, beginning in 1931. By 1941 the airport had expanded to 600 acres (240 ha) adding five hangars, a terminal building and five asphalt runways. The first scheduled jet flights were Northeast Convair 880s in April–May 1961. The facility was renamed after Thomas Cole Imeson in the 1950s. Imeson's work led to the creation of the Jacksonville Municipal Airport, as well as improvements to its runways, hangars and terminal buildings. Imeson Field served as the city's main airport for 42 years. Jacksonville International Airport, also located on the Northside, was dedicated on September 1, 1968, replacing Imeson Field.

On October 1, 1968, the city and county governments merged to create the Consolidated City of Jacksonville, winning voter approval the year prior. Fire, police, health & welfare, recreation, public works, and housing & urban development were all unified under the new government. The consolidation created a 900-square-mile entity. Jacksonville Consolidation was led by J. J. Daniel and Claude Yates, who found support from both inner-city blacks, who wanted more involvement in government after passage of the Voting Rights Act of 1965, that provided federal oversight and enforcement of their right to vote, and whites in the suburbs, who wanted more services and more control over the central city. Lower taxes, increased economic development, unification of the community, better public spending, and effective administration by a more central authority were all cited as reasons for a new consolidated government.

Amtrak's Jacksonville station at the Clifford Lane facility has been in operation since 1974, when it replaced the downtown Union Station, now the Prime F. Osborn III Convention Center. It currently serves the Silver Meteor and Silver Star trains as well as the Amtrak Thruway to Lakeland. Other services once used this station, including the Champion, Floridian, Florida Special, Palmetto, Silver Palm, Sunset Limited and Vacationer. In 2004 the Palmetto's route was shortened to end in Savannah, Georgia and in 2005 the Sunset Limited was shortened to end at the New Orleans Union Passenger Terminal as a result of Hurricane Katrina. However, the Sunset Limited has been proposed to return in the future.

Construction of the Dames Point Bridge began in 1985 and was completed in 1989. The bridge crosses the St. Johns River using a cable-stayed design, connecting Arlington to the Northside of Jacksonville. designed by HNTB Corporation and RS&H, Inc, and constructed by The Massman Construction Company, the main span is 1,300 feet (396.2 m), and is 175 feet (53.3 m) high. Upon completion, it was longest concrete cable-stayed bridge in the world.

Opening in 2003, the JAXPORT Cruise Terminal was completed in only six months, and was intended to be a temporary structure. Maintained by the Jacksonville Port Authority, the cruise ship terminal is located near the Dames Point Bridge, on the northern banks of the St. Johns River. Celebrity Cruises began regular service from Jacksonville on October 27, 2003, discontinuing service in 2005. The ship Carnival Miracle was christened at the Port of Jacksonville on February 27, 2004, beginning Jacksonville service by Carnival Cruise Lines. Five cruise ships were chartered to serve as floating hotels during the week preceding Super Bowl XXXIX in February 2005. Four of the vessels docked at JAXPORT terminals, providing over 3,500 rooms plus restaurants and night clubs for fans. As of 2019, cruises from Jacksonville visit the Bahamas and Eastern Caribbean on board the Carnival Ecstasy.

River City Marketplace opened on November 17, 2006 as the only quasi-regional outdoor shopping mall in the Northside, and the only one north of the St. Johns River. The 125-acre (0.51 km^{2}) shopping district is located south of Airport Road on the east side of Interstate 95, two miles (3 km) east of Jacksonville International Airport. When Phase II is fully built out, the project will have cost over $300 million to build and boast more than 100 retailers.

== Geography ==
Together with the Urban Core, Arlington, Southside, Westside and the Beaches, Northside is considered one of the large regions of Jacksonville, and the remaining municipalities in Duval County. As the name would suggest, the Northside consist of areas in northern Jacksonville, but there is no consistent definition for what constitute the boundaries of the region. The geographer John W. McEwen determined, using a Geographic Information System to sort names of 47 businesses with "Northside" in their name, that the area is roughly considered to be north of the Urban Core and north of Westside at 20th Street, and stretching west and north of the St. Johns River.

The Trout River is one of the most defining geographic feature of the Northside. The 20-mile-long (32 km) long tributary of the St. Johns River is located entirely within Jacksonville's Northside, and is considered brackish in its lower section. The Trout River has wetlands as far as the mouth of the river's longest tributary, the Ribault River. A notable feature itself, the Ribault River is named after Jean Ribault, a French naval officer. The river's headwaters are near Old Kings Road at an elevation of 7 feet (2.1 m) above sea level. The river cuts through the forest floor near its source, that portion of the river being classified as a creek. The river flows northward, as does the St. Johns River and many of the other tributaries of the Trout River. The river is 6.4 miles (10.3 km) long. Black Hammock Island is an island in a marsh area at the edge of Jacksonville, Florida, in the United States. It lies almost directly adjacent to the Timucuan Ecological and Historic Preserve. Cedar Point is located at the south end of Black Hammock Island.

=== Neighborhoods ===
There are numerous neighborhoods located within the vast area of the Northside. These include, but are not limited to, Black Hammock Island, Brentwood, Dinsmore, Fort George Island, Garden City, Highlands, Lake Forest, Longbranch, Moncrief Park, Norwood, Panama Park, Pecan Park, Oceanway, Ribault, Riverview, Royal Terrance, San Mateo and Tallulah-North Shore.

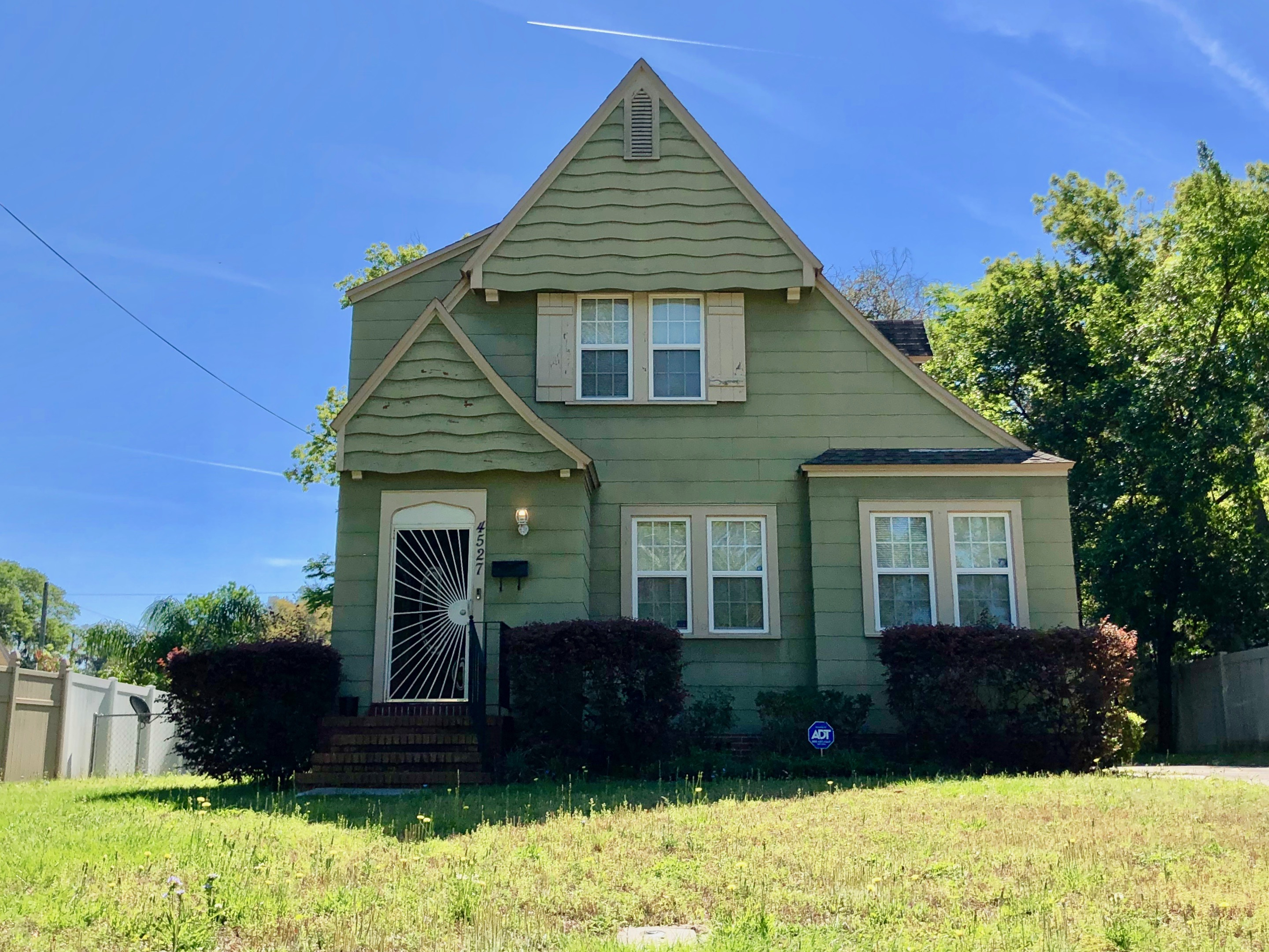
Brentwood

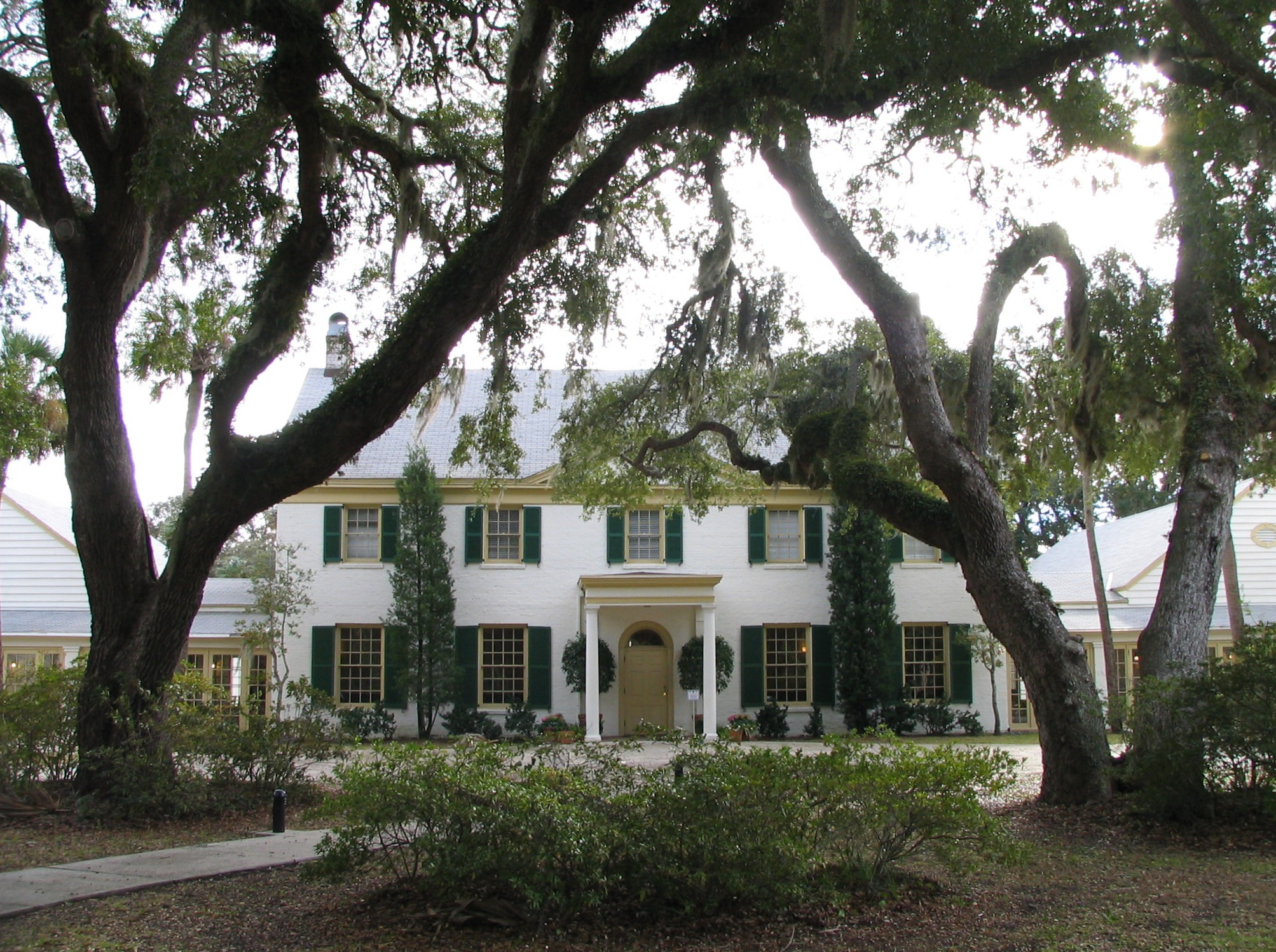
Fort George Island

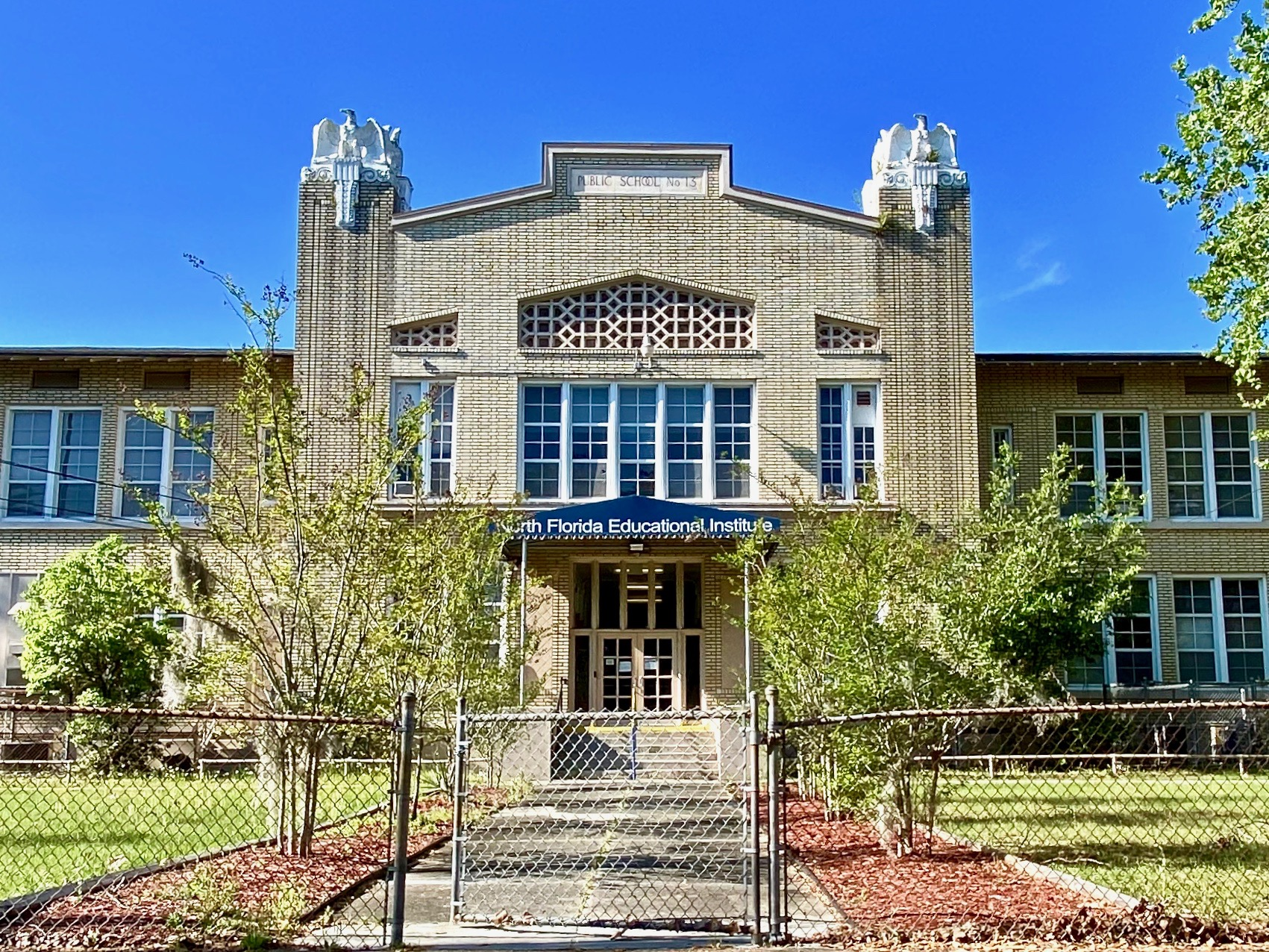
Panama Park

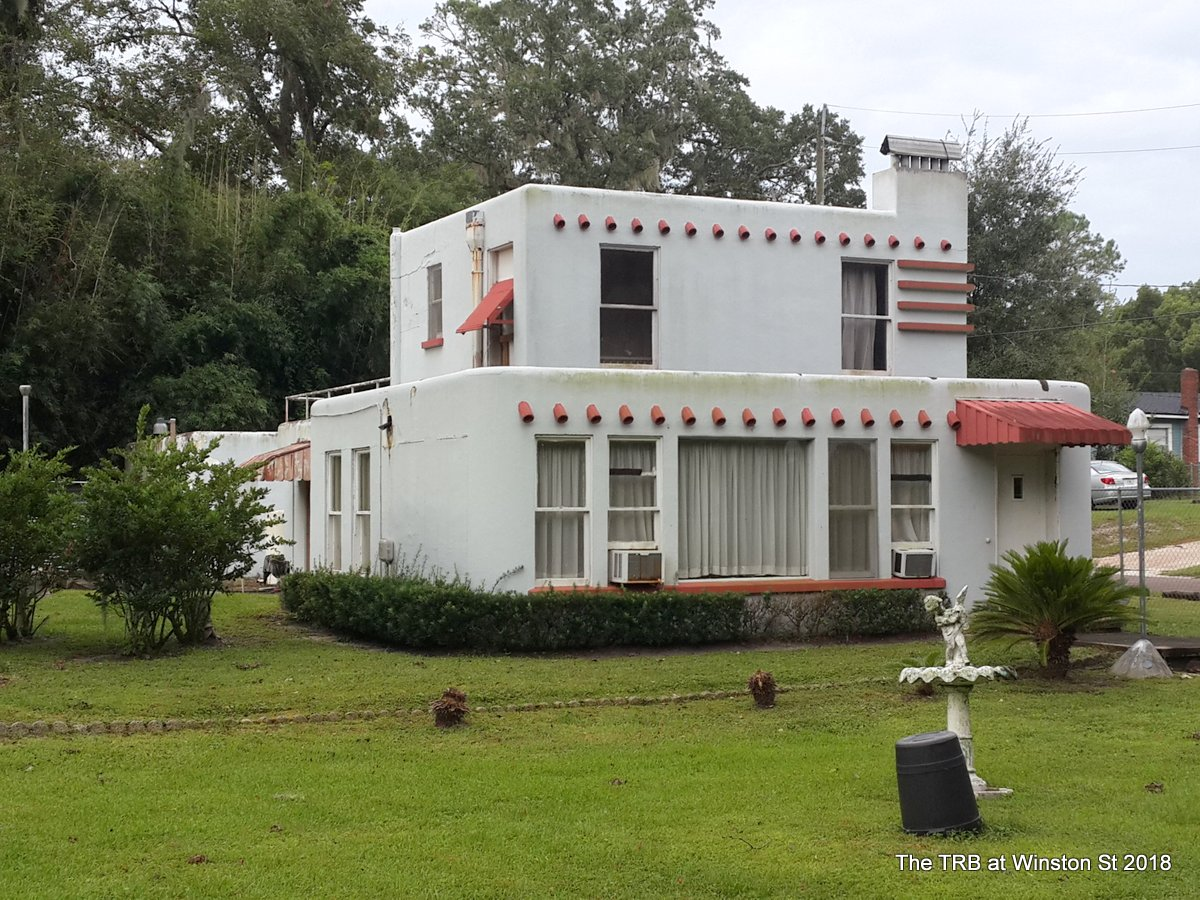
Riverview

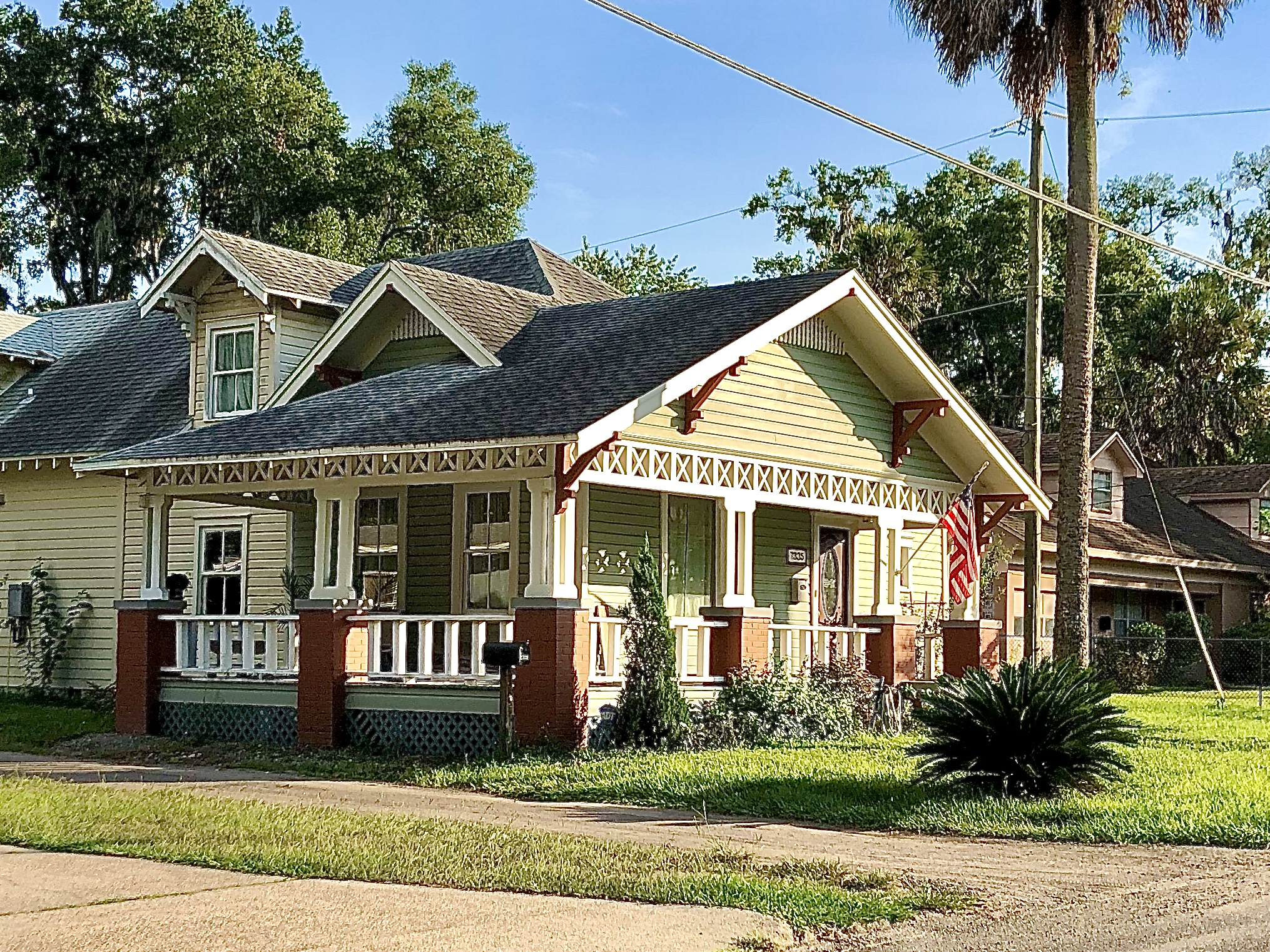
Tallulah-North Shore

=== Parks and public spaces ===
The Northside has protected lands operated by a variety of entities, including the National Park Service, Florida State Parks, City of Jacksonville Department of Parks and Recreation, and other private ventures.

==== National parks ====
The Timucuan Preserve is a U.S. National Preserve comprising over 46,000 acres (19,000 ha) of wetlands and waterways. It includes natural and historic areas such as the Fort Caroline National Memorial and the Kingsley Plantation, the oldest standing plantation in the state.

==== State parks ====
There are several state parks within the Northside, these include:

- Big Talbot Island State Park
- Fort George Island Cultural State Park
- George Crady Bridge Fishing Pier State Park
- Little Talbot Island State Park
- Pumpkin Hill Creek Preserve State Park
- Yellow Bluff Fort Historic State Park

==== City parks ====
Jacksonville operates the largest urban park system in the United States, providing facilities and services at more than 337 locations on more than 80,000 acres (320 km^{2}) City parks located in the Northside include the following:

- Alimacani Park is located on scenic State Road A1A on the south bank of the Fort George River. The marshy location offers ample bird observation. A boat ramp provides access to Fort George River and its tributaries.
- Betz-Tiger Point Preserve is surrounded by scenic saltwater marsh and offers views diverse wildlife includes gopher tortoise, birds, dolphins and reptiles. Pumpkin Hill Creek Preserve State Park and Betz Tiger Point Preserve adjoin.
- Cedar Point Preserve is located on Black Hammock Island and provides a habitat to several bird species.
- Huguenot Memorial Park is located on the Atlantic Ocean between the St. Johns River and the Fort George Inlet. The park requires an admission fee for access and features campsites, rental cabins and a nature center.
- Seaton Creek Historic Preserve is a pristine 840-acre preservation park on Jacksonville's Northside and is thought to be the site of the southernmost battle of the American Revolution. The park offers three trails covering about five miles, three creeks with a kayak landing on one and access for hikers, off-road bicyclists and Equestrians with parking for horse trailers.
- Thomas Creek Conservation Area is a historical preserve part of the Black Creek system and beckons water enthusiasts, kayakers and canoeists to its natural setting.
- Sheffield Park is located near the intersection of Cedar Point Road and New Berlin Road. Acquired in 2003, this 385 acre former dairy site houses two large ponds.

==== Cemeteries ====
The Northside is home to the following notable cemeteries:

- Jacksonville National Cemetery
- Evergreen Cemetery is a large historic cemetery added to the National Register of Historic Places on April 8, 2011.
- Memorial Cemetery is home to the Lewis Mausoleum, resting place of Abraham Lincoln Lewis (1865-1947), a Florida pioneer and prominent businessman in the African-American community.

==== Private ====
The Northside is also home to an array of other operations with the intent is to preserve land for the public good. These include:

- Jacksonville Zoo and Gardens houses over 2,400 rare and exotic animals and over 1,500 unique plant species and participates in many preservation and breeding programs to ensure the survival of endangered and threatened species as well as local fauna and flora.
- East Coast Greenway
- Machaba Balu Preserve

== Education ==
The Duval County Public Schools district operates public schools, including Andrew Jackson High School, Jean Ribault High School and First Coast High School, in the Northside area.

=== Higher education ===
Established in 1970, the North Campus of Florida State College at Jacksonville is one of four campuses located throughout the city, the other being the Downtown Campus, Kent Campus, and South Campus. In 2009, in recognition of a shortage of four-year colleges in the state, the Florida Legislature passed legislation creating the Florida College System, enabling some community colleges to become "state colleges", meaning they can offer more bachelor's degrees than traditional community colleges, but no graduate degree programs. FCCJ was one of the first community colleges to make the change, and, also in 2009, announced the change to their "Florida Community College at Jacksonville" to their current name, "Florida State College at Jacksonville". located off Dunn Avenue, near I-295, it houses many of FSCJ's health programs, including nursing, dental hygiene, and emergency medical services. North Campus also includes the Culinary Institute of the South, a culinary school with its own restaurant, and a cosmetology program. The North Campus includes the college's baseball and softball facilities.

== Transportation ==
=== Airports ===
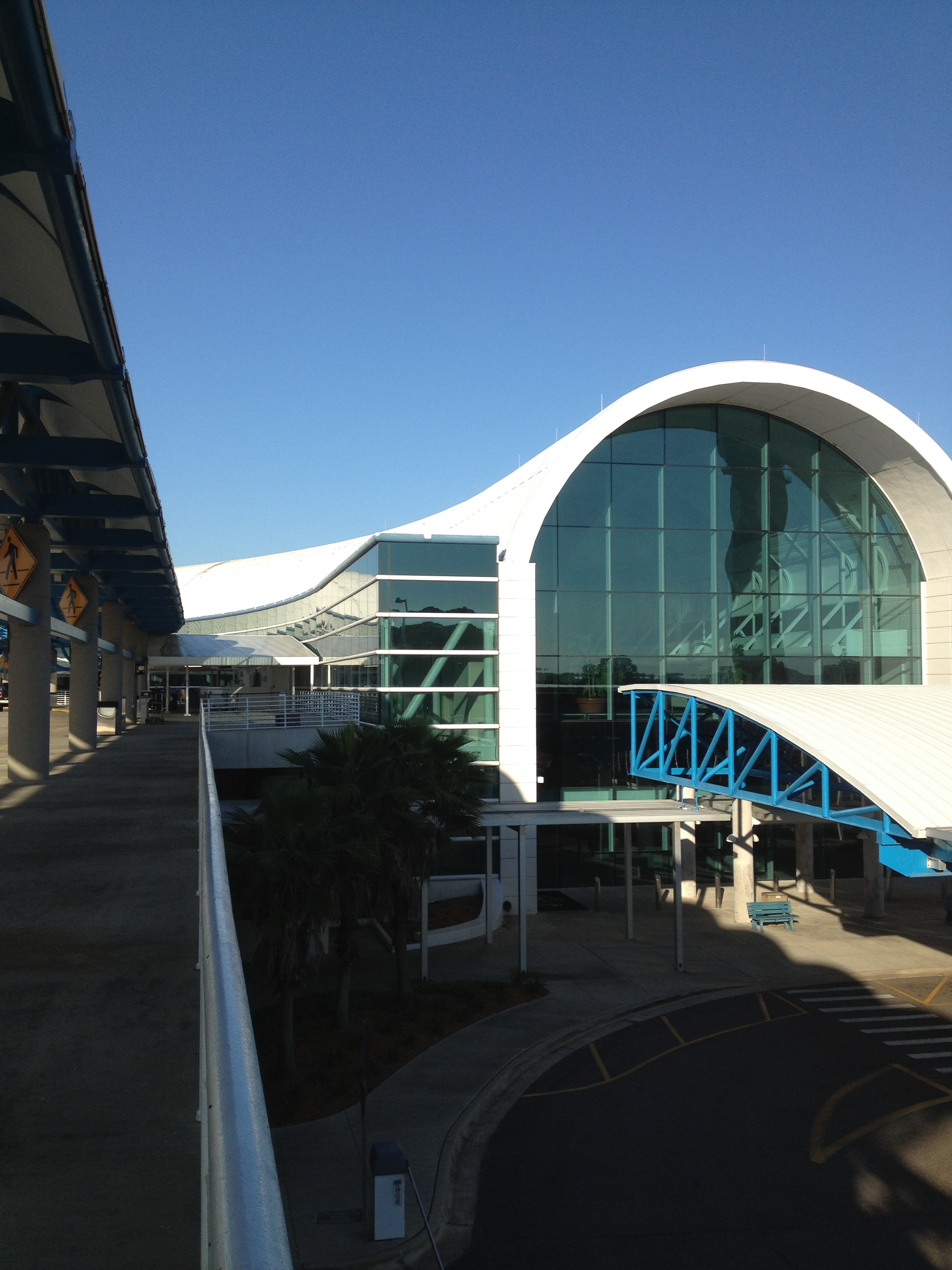
Jacksonville International Airport

Jacksonville International Airport (IATA: JAX, ICAO: KJAX, FAA LID: JAX) is a major regional passenger air service provider, featuring non-stop flights to dozens of major US cities. The facility opened on Jacksonville's Northside in 1968. Commercial air service at Imeson Field, also located in the Northside, ceased operations. The airport covers 7,911 acres (3,201 ha) and has two concrete runways: 8/26, 10,000 x 150 ft (3,048 x 46 m) and 14/32, 7,701 x 150 ft (2,347 x 46 m). The terminal at JIA is composed of a baggage claim area, on the first floor and a ticketing area on the second floor, at the front of the structure. Past baggage claim and ticketing is the mezzanine, where shops, restaurants and the security checkpoint are located. Beyond the mezzanine are the airport's Concourses A and C, which include 10 gates each (for a total of 20), along with other shops and restaurants. In 2018, the airport handled 6,460,253 passengers, breaking the previous record set in 2007. This increase in traffic prompted the JAA to revive the plan to rebuild concourse B. The new concourse could open as early as 2022, providing six additional gates and could be expanded later with six more. The design of concourses A and C also allow them to be extended to accommodate additional gates. In 2019, RS&H and Jacobs Engineering were chosen to perform the design, while Balfour Beatty was selected as the construction manager for the concourse B project.

=== Public transportation ===
Northside is served by several Jacksonville Transportation Authority (JTA) bus routes. These routes include the following:

- 1 North Main
- 3 Moncrief
- 4 Kings
- 11 A. Philip Randolph
- 12 Myrtle / Lem Turner
- 21 Boulevard/ Gateway
- 22 Avenue B
- 51 Edgewood
- 81 Dinsmore Shuttle
- 82 Amazon Shuttle
- First Coast Flyer Green (bus rapid transit)

=== Highways ===
Major limited access highways:

- Interstate 95 routes north to Maine and runs south to Miami.
- Interstate 295 serves as a beltway routing around the city and connects to all of the interstate highways.

Major arterial highways:

- US 1
- US 17
- US 23
- State Road 115
- State Road A1A Scenic two-lane road that runs along the Atlantic Ocean.

=== Ferries ===
The Saint Johns River Ferry, also known as the Mayport Ferry, has been operating between Mayport and Fort George Island since 1874. The 0.9 miles (1.4 km) voyage crosses the Saint Johns River about 2.5 miles (4.0 km) inland of the river's mouth and travels in an east–west direction for approximately 2,000 feet (610 m) on State Road A1A. Departures still occur daily every half-hour.

== See also ==
- Neighborhoods of Jacksonville
- Architecture of Jacksonville
- National Register of Historic Places listings in Duval County, Florida
