= Trout River (Florida) =

River in the United States of America

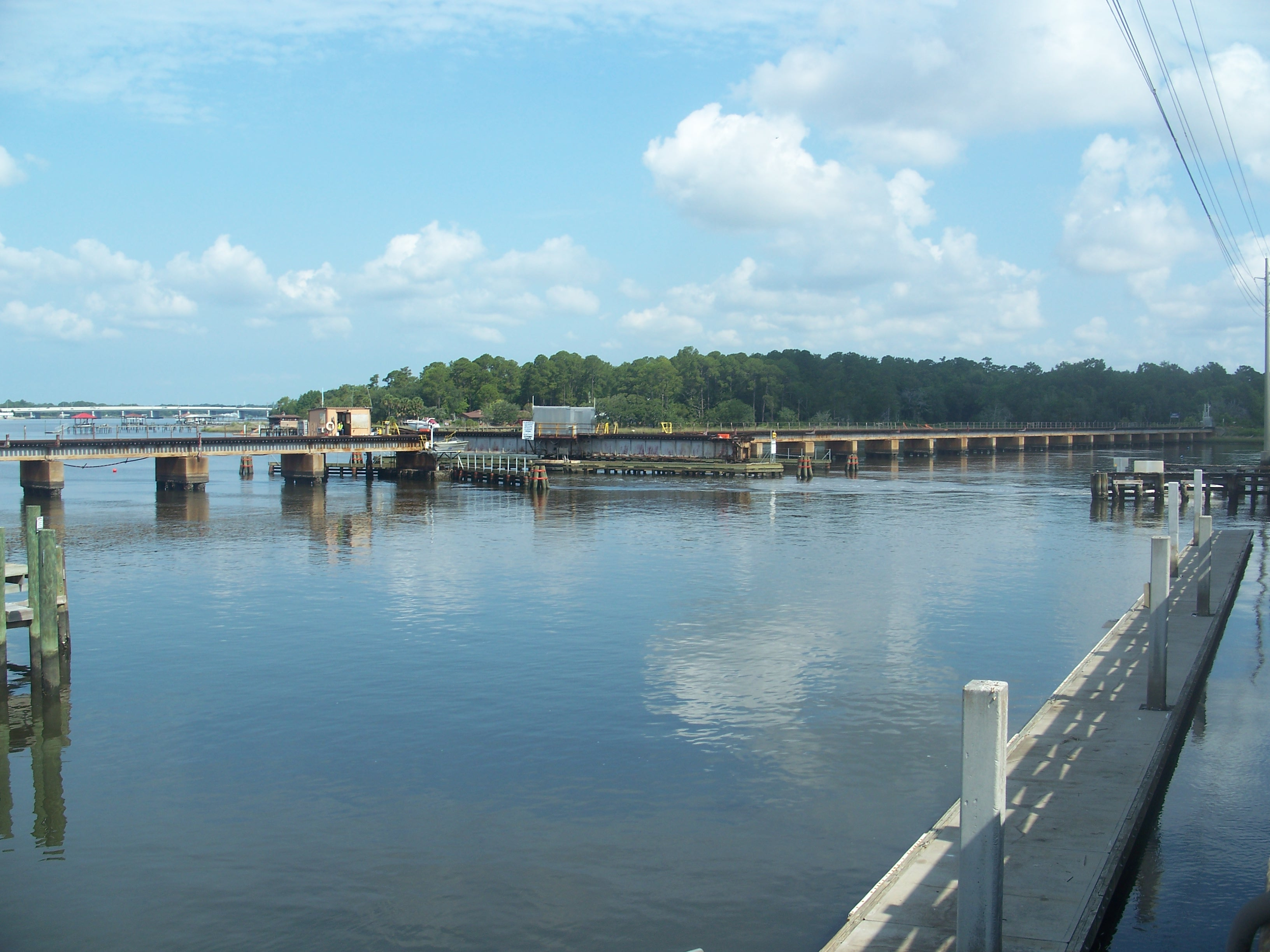

Location
- Country: United States

Physical characteristics
- Source
  - location: Northwestern Duval County, Florida
- Mouth
  - location: St. Johns River at Sandfly Point.
- Length: 20 mi (32 km)

The Trout River is a 20-mile-long (32 km) tributary of the St. Johns River in Duval County, Florida. Located entirely within Jacksonville's Northside area, the river is brackish in its lower section. The widest point of the river is near the St. Johns River, where it is 0.6 miles (1.0 km) across. The Trout River has wetlands as far as the mouth of the river's longest tributary, the Ribault River.

== Tributaries ==
Major tributaries of the Trout River include the Ribault River, Little Trout River, and Moncrief Creek.

== Course ==
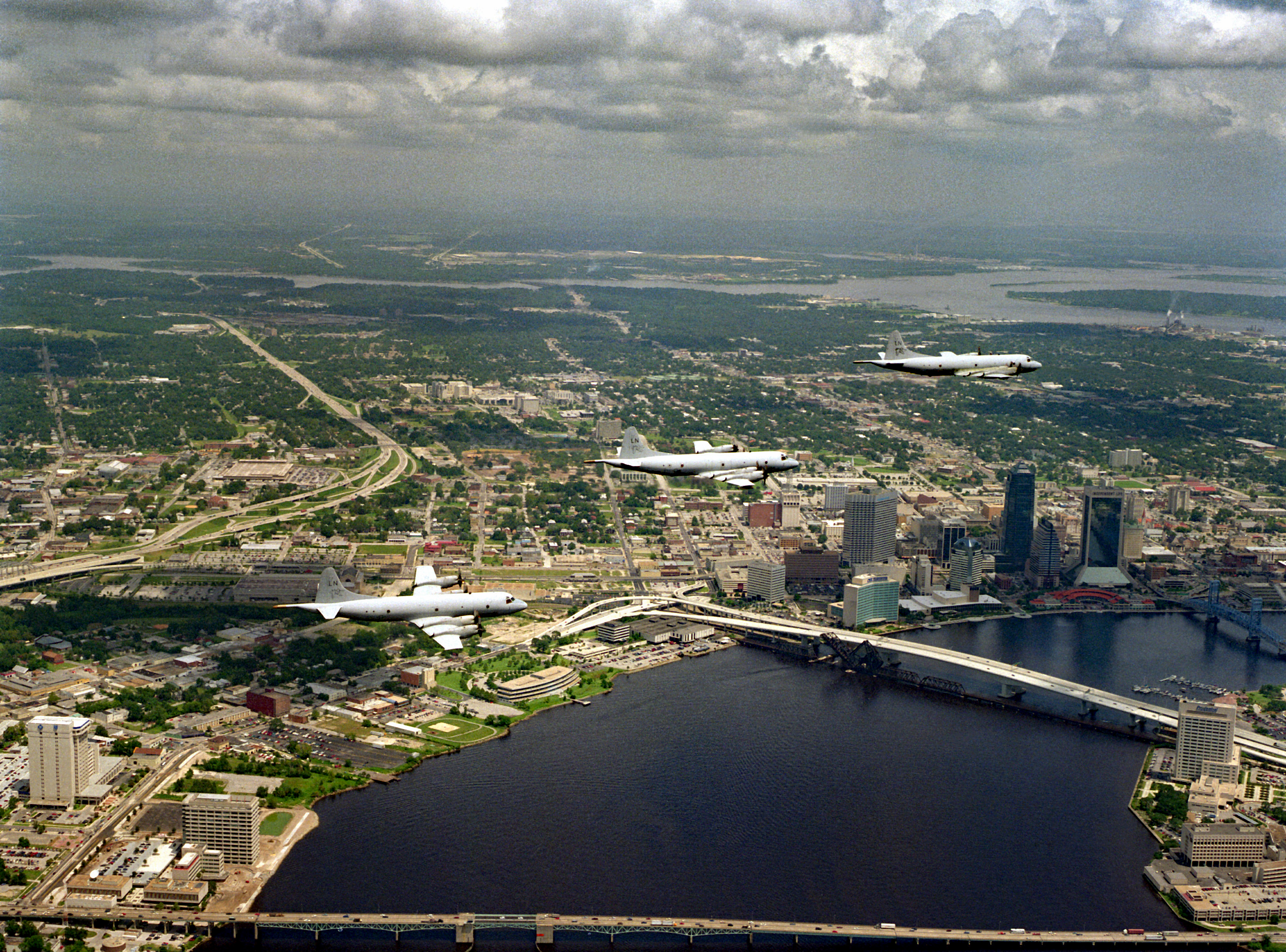
An aerial photo of Jacksonville, Florida with the Trout River in the distance near the top of the picture.

Beginning in northwestern Jacksonville, in Duval County, the river starts out as a creek. 0.03 miles (0.048 km) east of the source, the river is crossed by U.S. 1. 0.4 miles (0.64 km) downstream, the creek passes through the subdivision of River Falls. After this, the river widens into wetlands with a multitude of tributaries. 2.3 miles (3.7 km) downstream, a long tributary named the "Little Trout River". It originates at the forest at the corner of U.S. 1 and Interstate 295. 2.1 miles (3.4 km) downstream, Lem Turner Road (State Road 115) crosses the river as the C Ray Greene Bridge. 2.2 miles (3.5 km) downstream, the river becomes brackish. There is also the Ribault River, the longest of the three main tributaries. 0.7 miles (1.1 km) downstream, Interstate 95 crosses the river as the Trout River Bridge. 0.4 miles (0.64 km) downstream is Moncrief Creek, the third and last tributary of the Trout River. 0.7 miles (1.1 km) downstream, U.S. Route 17 crosses the river, spanning 0.2 miles (0.32 km). 1-mile (1.6 km) downstream is the St. Johns River, the mouth of the river at Sandfly Point.

== List of crossings ==
Bridge	Route	Location	Coordinates
	US 17	Jacksonville
	Kingsland Subdivision	Jacksonville
Trout River Bridge	Interstate 95	Jacksonville
C. Ray Greene Bridge	SR 115	Jacksonville
	Interstate 295	Jacksonville
	US 1-US 23	Jacksonville

== Destinations along the river ==
- Jacksonville Zoo
- Trout River Boulevard is a residential road that run along partially along the Trout River. It runs for 3.9 miles (6.3 km) along the floodplain of the river. At the 2-mile (3.2 km) mark, the road turns away from the river.

Western Terminus: Old Kings Road

- Coordinates: 30°24′57″N 81°45′36″W

Eastern Terminus: Lem Turner Boulevard

- Coordinates: 30°24′55″N 81°41′43″W
- Navy Fuel Depot

=== Riverside parks ===
- North Shore Park is a forested park at the north end of Pearl Street in North Shore neighborhood of Jacksonville, covering 0.3 square miles (0.78 km^{2}).

Coordinates: 30°23′23″N 81°39′22″W

- Riverside Park is a park that features two docks.

Coordinates: 30°24′54″N 81°41′19″W

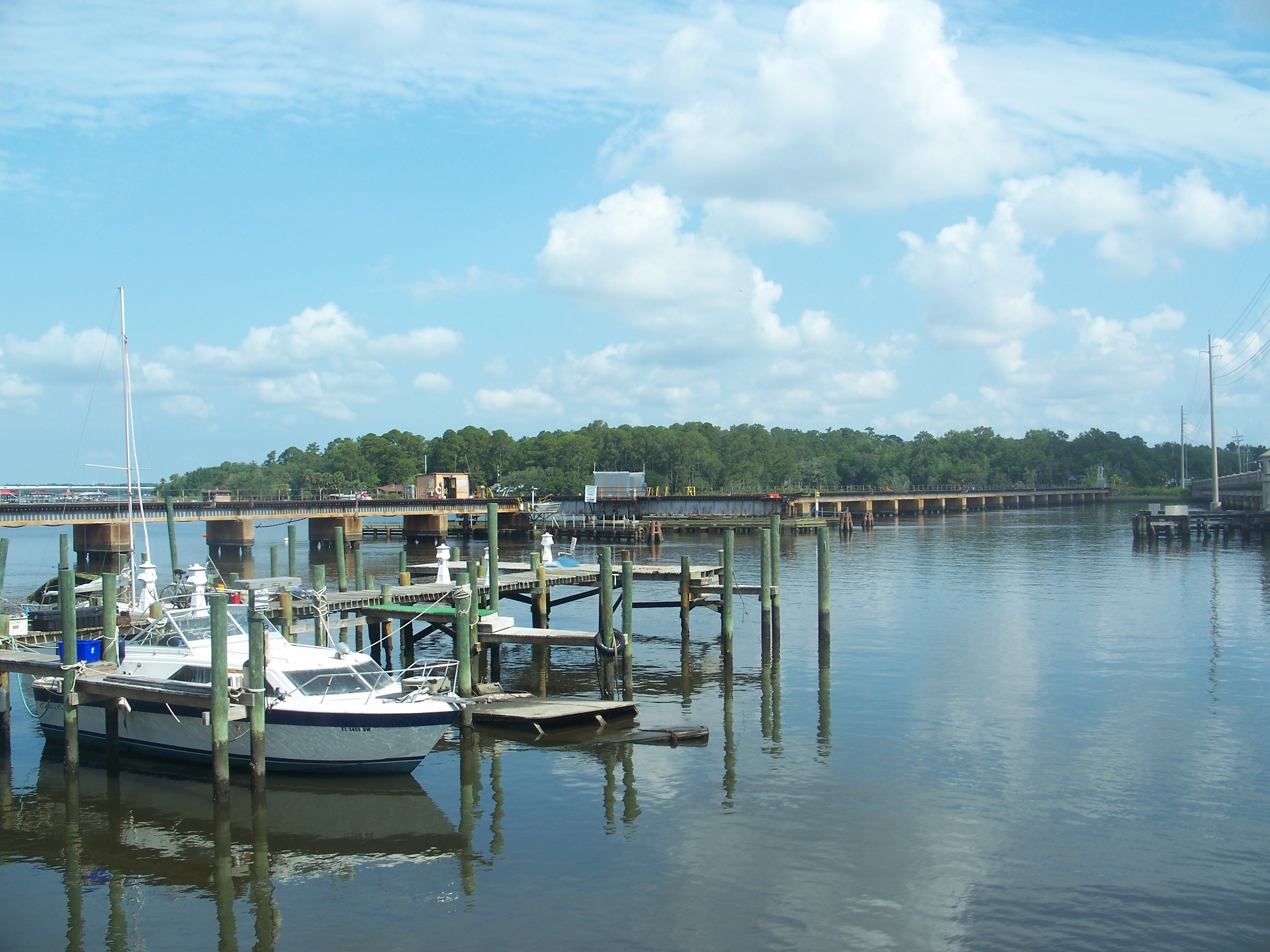
Trout River near US 17

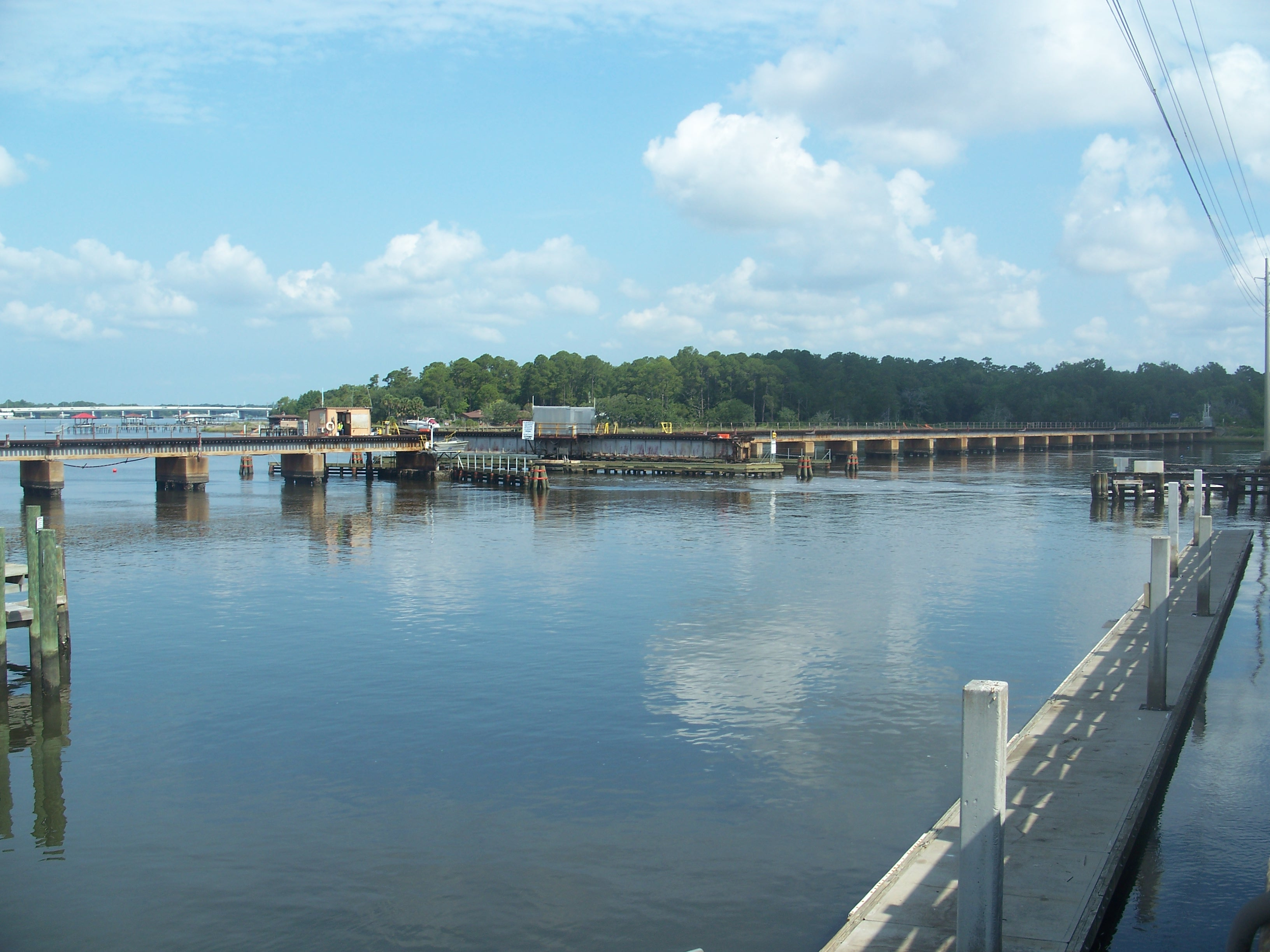
Trout River near US 17

== See also ==
- List of Florida rivers
