= Black Hammock Island =

Island in Duval County, Florida, United States

- Black Hammock Island Black Hammock Island (North Atlantic)

Geography
- Location: North Atlantic
- Coordinates: 30°31′16″N 81°28′49″W

Administration
- United States
- State: Florida
- County: Duval

Additional information
- Official website: Official website

Black Hammock Island is an island located in the Northside area of Jacksonville, Florida, in the United States. The island is surrounded by marsh, and is almost directly adjacent to the Timucuan Ecological and Historic Preserve. Cedar Point, operated by the National Park Service, is located at the south end of Black Hammock Island.
