= Trout River Bridge =

Bridge in Florida, United States of America

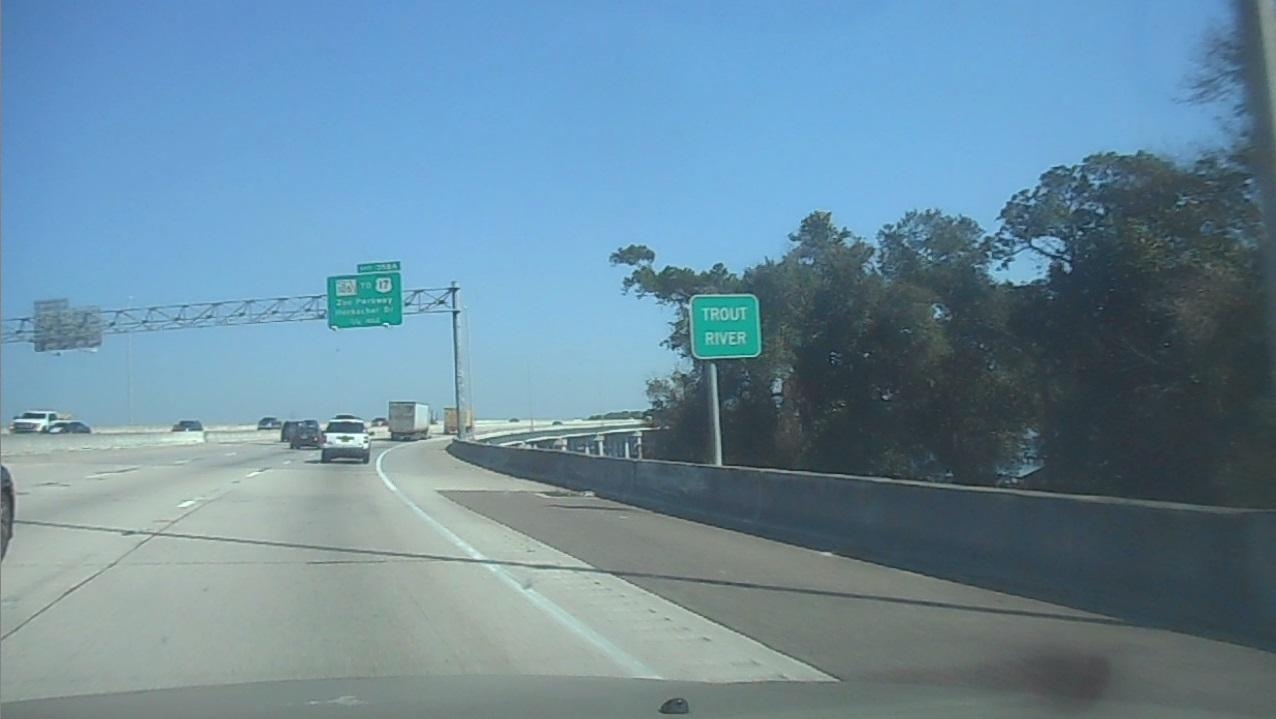
- Northbound I-95 as it crosses over the Trout River in February 2021.
- Coordinates: 30°24′N 81°40′W
- Carries: Six lanes of I-95
- Crosses: Trout River
- Locale: Jacksonville, Florida
- Official name: Trout River Bridge
- Maintained by: Florida Department of Transportation

Characteristics
- Design: Segmental bridge
- Total length: 1819 feet
- Width: Six lanes
- Clearance below: 34 feet

The Trout River Bridge is a six lane segmental bridge carrying Interstate 95 across Trout River, 5 miles (8.0 km) north of downtown Jacksonville, Florida. It is the third crossing of I-95 south of Georgia. A Trout River Bridge Replacement project commenced in 2005, replacing the original bridge with a six lane bridge; this project was completed in July 2008.
