= Tallulah-North Shore =

- Neighborhood of Jacksonville
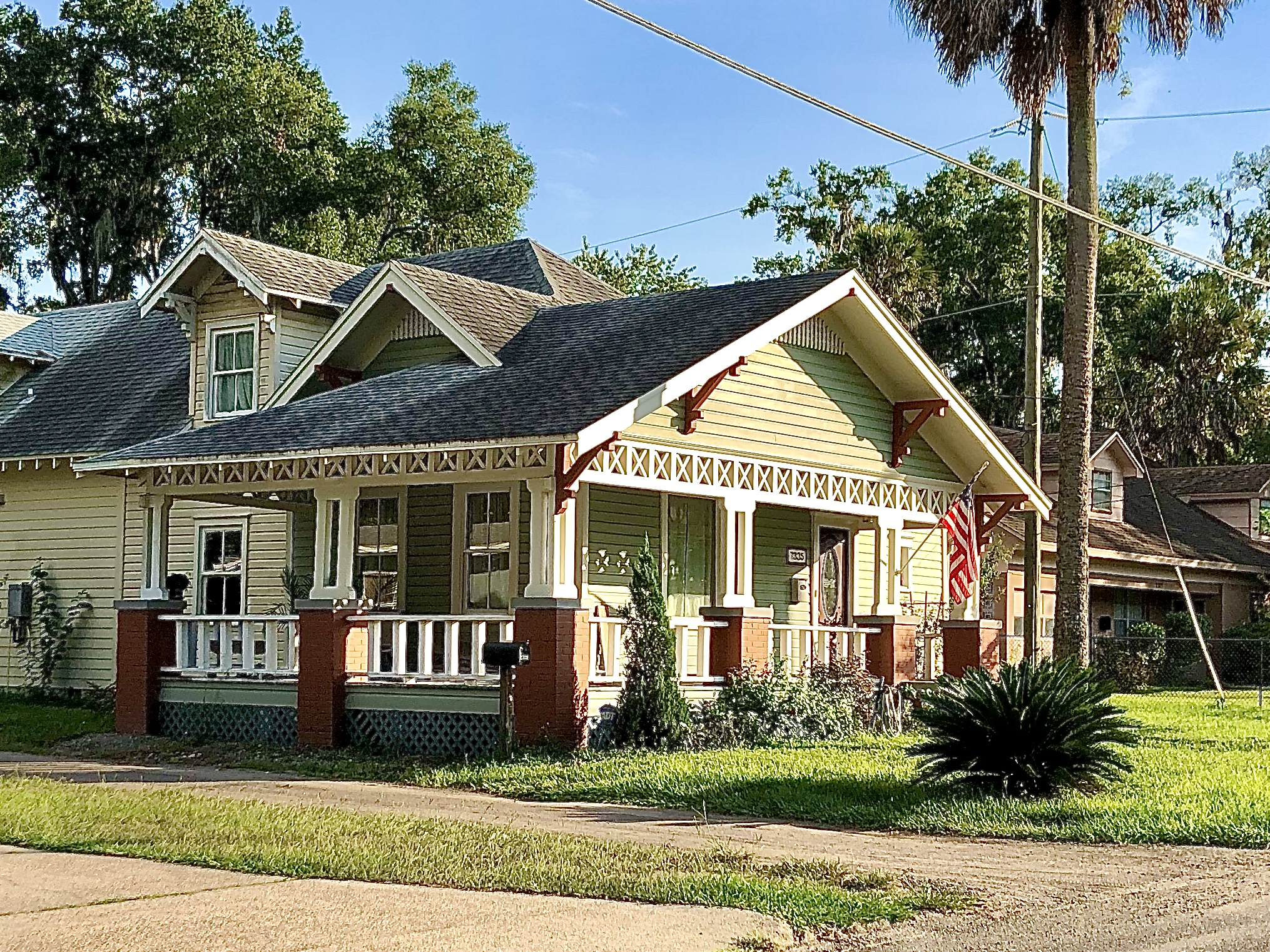
- Craftsman style home in the Tallulah-North Shore neighborhood
- Coordinates: 30.38587°N 81.65670°W
- Country: United States
- State: Florida
- City: Jacksonville

Government
  - City Council: Sam Newby; Ju'Coby Pittman
  - State Assembly: Travis Davis
  - State Senate: Audrey Gibson
  - U.S. House: Al Lawson (D)

Population (2010)
  - Total: 3,294
- ZIP Code: 32208
- Area code: 904

Tallulah-North Shore, or simply North Shore, is a neighborhood of Jacksonville, Florida located in the Northside area. First platted in 1879, the primarily residential area was annexed by Jacksonville in 1925. The Trout River, a tributary of the St. Johns River, is North Shore's most notable feature and also forms the neighborhood's northern border.

== Geography ==
Tallulah-North Shore is located on Jacksonville's Northside, along the banks of Trout River. The neighborhood's boundaries consist of Trout River on the northern edge, Moncrief Creek to the west, Main Street to the east, and CSX rail lines bordering the Brentwood neighborhood to the south.

== History ==
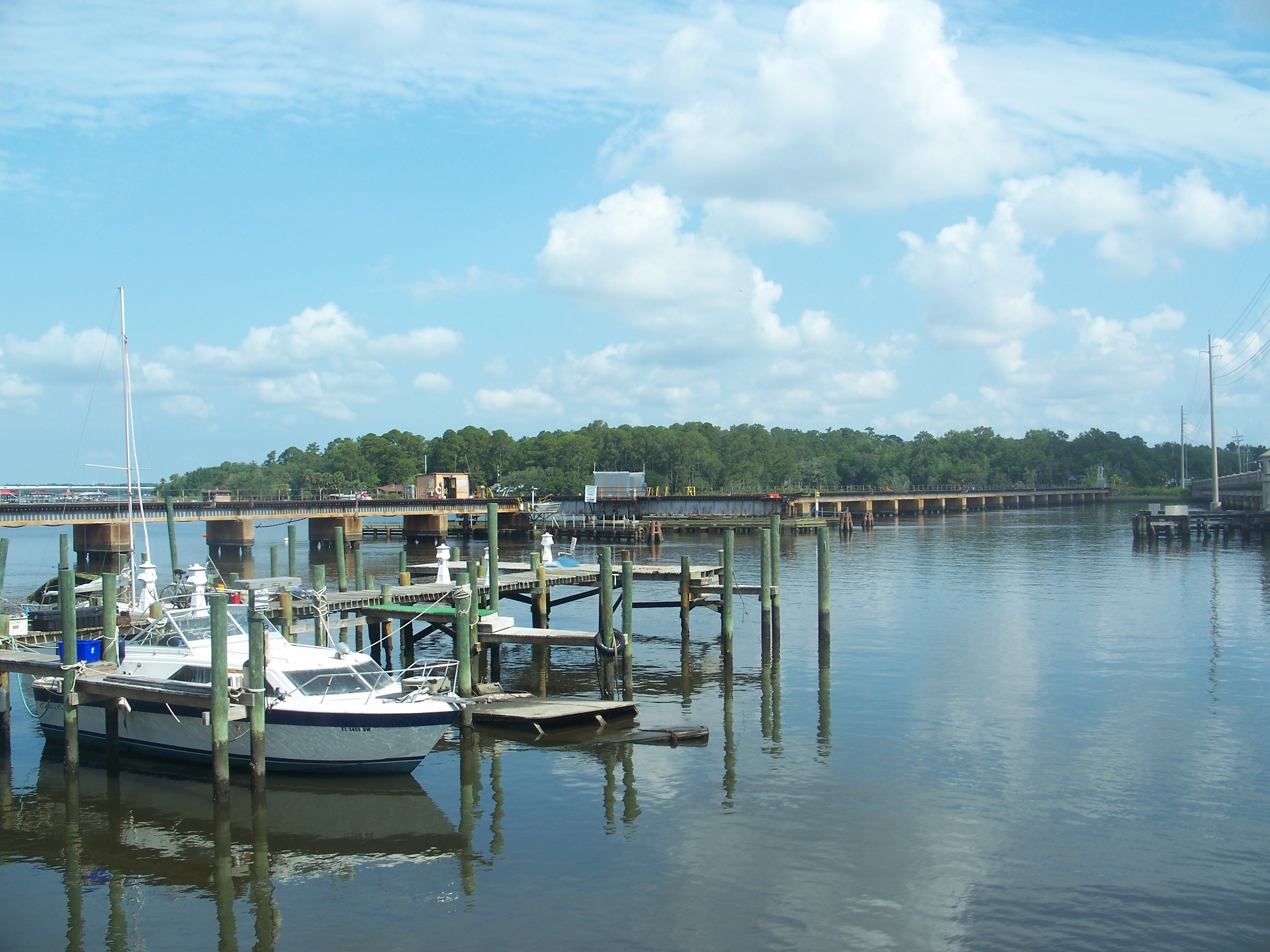
View of Trout River from Tallulah-North Shore

Throughout most of the 1800s the area now considered Tallulah-North Shore consisted mainly of farms, lumberyards and naval stores operations. In 1879, anticipating residential growth in the region, a man by the name of Jeremiah Fallausbee platted an area he called Tallulah. The name "Tallulah" is an American Indian name meaning "leaping water." The area would remain sparsely populated until housing needs increased in the wake of the Great Fire of 1901. In 1915, additional areas were platted under the name North Shore. The city annexed the entire area in 1925.

== Education ==
North Shore Elementary, operated by the Duval County Public Schools district, is the only public school in the neighborhood or North Shore.

== Economy ==
=== Commercial districts ===
The corner of N. Pearl Street and Tallulah Avenue is the commercial area most associated with the Tallulah-North Shore neighborhood. Made up of a small agglomeration of buildings, the area houses a meat market, a seafood market and local restaurants. Currently the home of Miller's Soulfood Kitchen, the intersection's most striking building was designed by local architect Taylor Hardwick as a milk house for the Skinner's Dairy company. The neighborhood's eastern border is made up exclusively of commercial development paralleling Main Street (US 17). On its southwestern edge, North Shore is also proximal to commercial areas along Norwood Avenue, including the Gateway Town Center, a 700,000 square feet shopping center housing a chain grocer and pharmacy.

== Transportation ==
=== Public transportation ===
Tallulah-North Shore is served by several Jacksonville Transportation Authority (JTA) bus routes. These routes include the following:

- 1 North Main
- 12 Myrtle / Lem Turner
- 51 Edgewood
- 86 Northside
- First Coast Flyer Green line (BRT)

== Features ==
=== North Shore Park ===
North Shore Park is located along the Trout River at the northern terminus of Pearl Street. The park was included and named on the 1915 plat of North Shore. The city later expanded the park by acquiring adjacent properties in 1943 and 1944. The park contains picnic facilities, a boat landing, an asphalt walking trail and stone benches. A shoreline kayak launch was added to the park in 2018.

=== Tallulah Park ===
Tallulah Park is located on Tallulah Avenue at Vermillion Street. Land for the park was purchased by the city in 1935, and it was later expanded in 1949. The four-acre park contains many of the same facilities that it did in 1965. Facilities include lighted tennis courts, a baseball diamond and basketball courts. An attractive tree canopy surrounds the perimeter of the park.

=== Signet Park ===
Signet Park is located along the banks of Trout River. The park was included in the 1915 plat of North Shore but it was unnamed at that time. Though the tract may have been known as Trout Park for a time, it eventually became known as Signet Park, due in part to the name change of Silver Street to Signet Street, which is adjacent to the park. An additional parcel extending to the Trout River was later incorporated onto the northern end of the park.

=== Rolliston Park ===
Rolliston Park is located along the west side of a canal that leads into the Trout River. The developers of North Shore donated most of the land for the park to the city in 1940 and 1941. The city purchased the remainder from the developer in 1944. Known as Rolliston Street Park in 1969, the park's most striking feature is an elongated expanse of lawn, which is bordered by a tree-lined canal and the Trout River.

== See also ==
- Neighborhoods of Jacksonville
- Architecture of Jacksonville
