= Ribault River =

River in the United States of America

Ribault River is a tributary of the Trout River. It is located entirely in Jacksonville, Florida. The river is named after Jean Ribault, a French naval officer. The river's headwaters are near Old Kings Road at an elevation of 7 feet (2.1 m) above sea level. The river cuts through the forest floor near its source, that portion of the river being classified as a creek. The river flows northward, as does the St. Johns River and many of the other tributaries of the Trout River. The river is 6.4 miles (10.3 km) long.

== Crossings ==
This is a list of bridges that cross the Ribault River, starting at the river's source.

Bridge	Route	Location	Coordinates
Norfolk Southern bridge	Valdosta District	Jacksonville
Amtrak bridge	Nahunta Subdivision	Jacksonville	30°22′25″N 81°43′57″W
	US 1/US 23	Jacksonville	30°22′31″N 81°43′36″W
	West Moncrief Road.	Jacksonville	30°23′21″N 81°43′12″W
	Ribault Scenic Road	Jacksonville	30°23′37″N 81°42′47″W
	Lem Turner Boulevard.	Jacksonville	30°23′45″N 81°40′58″W

== See also ==
- List of Florida rivers
- Jacksonville, Florida
- Jean Ribault
- St. Johns River
