= Garden City (Jacksonville) =

- Neighbourhood
- Garden City
- Location within Florida Location within the United States
- Coordinates: 30.442°N 81.700°W
- Country: United States
- State: Florida
- County: Duval County
- City: Jacksonville

Population
  - Total: 1,940
- ZIP Code: 32218

Garden City is a neighborhood in Jacksonville, Florida, United States. Located in the Northside area, it has an estimated population of 1,940 people. Garden City is located in the vicinity of Florida State Road 104 and Florida State Road 115.

== See also ==
- Neighborhoods of Jacksonville
- Architecture of Jacksonville
