= National Register of Historic Places listings in Putnam County, Florida =

Location of Putnam County in Florida

This is a list of the National Register of Historic Places listings in Putnam County, Florida.

This is intended to be a complete list of the properties and districts on the National Register of Historic Places in Putnam County, Florida, United States. The locations of National Register properties and districts for which the latitude and longitude coordinates are included below may be seen in a map.

There are 24 properties and districts listed on the National Register in the county.

This National Park Service list is complete through NPS recent listings posted June 26, 2026.

Contents: Counties in Florida (non-linked contain no National Register listings)
Alachua - Baker - Bay - Bradford - Brevard - Broward - Calhoun - Charlotte - Citrus - Clay - Collier - Columbia - DeSoto - Dixie - Duval - Escambia - Flagler - Franklin - Gadsden - Gilchrist - Glades - Gulf - Hamilton - Hardee - Hendry - Hernando - Highlands - Hillsborough (Tampa) - Holmes - Indian River - Jackson - Jefferson - Lafayette - Lake - Lee - Leon - Levy - Liberty - Madison - Manatee - Marion - Martin - Miami-Dade (Miami) - Monroe - Nassau - Okaloosa - Okeechobee - Orange - Osceola - Palm Beach - Pasco - Pinellas - Polk - Putnam - St. Johns - St. Lucie - Santa Rosa - Sarasota - Seminole - Sumter - Suwannee - Taylor - Union - Volusia - Wakulla - Walton - Washington

== Current listings ==
	Name on the Register	Image	Date listed	Location	City or town	Description
1	Bethel African American Episcopal Church	Bethel African American Episcopal Church	May 16, 2016 (#16000270)	719 Reid St. 29°38′53″N 81°38′11″W	Palatka	
2	Bostwick School	Bostwick School	September 29, 1999 (#99001204)	125 Tillman Street; 29°46′16″N 81°38′02″W	Bostwick	
3	Bronson-Mulholland House	Bronson-Mulholland House	December 27, 1972 (#72000351)	Madison between 1st and 2nd Streets; 29°39′00″N 81°37′42″W	Palatka	
4	Central Academy	Central Academy	November 12, 1998 (#98001348)	1207 Washington Street; 29°39′19″N 81°38′26″W	Palatka	
5	Crescent City Historic District	Crescent City Historic District	December 5, 1996 (#96001367)	Roughly bounded by Lake Stella, Vernon Avenue, Lake Crescent, and Orange Avenue; 29°25′49″N 81°30′36″W	Crescent City	
6	Cummings House		March 17, 2015 (#15000075)	298 County Road 310; 29°32′32″N 81°46′28″W	Palatka	Also known as The Rodman Plantation
7	First Congregational Church of Interlachen		March 8, 2024 (#100009673)	415 Washington Street; 25°47′04″N 80°12′00″W	Interlachen	
8	Hotel James	Hotel James	August 28, 2019 (#100004351)	300 St. Johns Ave. 29°38′49″N 81°37′52″W	Palatka	
9	Hubbard House	Hubbard House	August 14, 1973 (#73000601)	600 North Park Street in Hubbard Park; 29°26′02″N 81°30′22″W	Crescent City	
10	Interlachen Academy	Interlachen Academy	March 4, 2024 (#100008857)	108 North Cty. Rd. 315; 29°37′44″N 81°53′10″W	Interlachen	Part of the Florida's Historic Black Public Schools MPS
11	Interlachen Hall	Interlachen Hall	June 2, 2000 (#00000561)	215 Atlantic Avenue; 29°37′24″N 81°53′32″W	Interlachen	
12	Larimer Memorial Library	Larimer Memorial Library	March 12, 2008 (#08000163)	216 Reid Street; 29°38′51″N 81°37′50″W	Palatka	
13	Lincoln Lane School	Lincoln Lane School	April 22, 2023 (#100008856)	116 Lincoln Ln. 29°37′47″N 81°53′02″W	Interlachen	
14	Melrose Historic District	Melrose Historic District	January 12, 1990 (#89002305)	Roughly bounded by Seminole Ridge Road, Grove Street, South Street, Quail Street, and Melrose Bay; 29°42′45″N 82°03′03″W	Melrose	
15	Melrose Woman's Club	Melrose Woman's Club	April 6, 1978 (#78000956)	Pine Street; 29°42′40″N 82°02′49″W	Melrose	
16	Mount Royal	Mount Royal	May 7, 1973 (#73000603)	Address Restricted; 29°26′11″N 81°39′37″W	Welaka	
17	Old A.C.L. Union Depot	Old A.C.L. Union Depot	February 25, 1988 (#88000162)	200 North Twelfth Street; 29°38′58″N 81°38′26″W	Palatka	
18	Palatka North Historic District	Palatka North Historic District	November 17, 1983 (#83003552)	Roughly bounded by the St. Johns River and Bronson, North 1st, North 5th, and Main Streets; 29°38′59″N 81°37′47″W	Palatka	
19	Palatka Water Works	Palatka Water Works	March 13, 2023 (#100008739)	1101 Whitewater Dr. 29°38′04″N 81°38′29″W	Palatka	
20	Palatka Ravine Gardens Historic District	Palatka Ravine Gardens Historic District	June 10, 1999 (#99000694)	1600 Twigg Street; 29°38′00″N 81°38′48″W	Palatka	
21	Palatka South Historic District	Palatka South Historic District	November 17, 1983 (#83003553)	Roughly bounded by the St. Johns River and Oak, South 9th, and Morris Streets; 29°38′40″N 81°38′06″W	Palatka	
22	St. Marks Episcopal Church	St. Marks Episcopal Church	May 9, 1973 (#73000602)	2nd and Main Streets; 29°38′55″N 81°37′46″W	Palatka	
23	St. Mary's Episcopal Church	St. Mary's Episcopal Church	July 1, 2026 (#100013184)	809 St Johns Avenue; 29°38′50″N 81°38′14″E	Palatka	Part of the Florida's Carpenter Gothic Churches MPS
24	Tenney House and Groveland Hotel	Tenney House and Groveland Hotel	October 30, 1997 (#97001284)	100 and 102 Commercial Avenue; 29°44′48″N 81°32′50″W	Federal Point	

== See also ==
- List of National Historic Landmarks in Florida
- National Register of Historic Places listings in Florida
