= Tenney =

Tenney may refer to:

== People ==
- Anne Tenney (born 1954), actress
- Asa Wentworth Tenney (1833–1897), federal judge
- Charles Daniel Tenney (1857–1930), American educator and diplomat to China
- Charles H. Tenney (1842–1919), "City Father" in Methuen, Massachusetts; hat merchant and banker, New York City
- Charles Henry Tenney (1911–1994), federal judge
- Claudia Tenney (born 1961), United States Representative from New York
- Del Tenney (1930–2013), American film director
- Frank Tenney Johnson (1874–1939), painter of American west
- Fred Tenney (1871–1952), American baseball player
- Fred Tenney (outfielder) (1859–1919), American baseball player
- Helen Tenney, American spy for the Soviet Union in the 1930s and 1940s
- Horace A. Tenney (1820–1906), American politician
- Jack Tenney (1898–1970), American politician and composer
- James Tenney (1934–2006), American composer and music theorist
- Jon Tenney (born 1961), American actor
- Kevin S. Tenney (born 1955), film director, screenwriter
- Merrill C. Tenney (1904–1985), professor of New Testament and Greek
- Mesh Tenney (1907–1993), American Thoroughbred horse trainer
- Robin Tenney (born 1958), American tennis player
- Samuel Tenney (1748–1816), United States Representative from New Hampshire
- Tabitha Gilman Tenney, author (1762–1837)
- Tommy Tenney, American preacher and author
- Turner Tenney (born 1998), American eSports player and streamer
- William Jewett Tenney (1814–1883), American author, editor

== Places ==
=== United States ===
- Tenney, Minnesota, an unincorporated community in western Minnesota
- Tenney Mountain, near Plymouth, New Hampshire
- Tenney Castle Gatehouse, in Methuen, Massachusetts, and on the National Register of Historic Places
- Tenney Fire Hall, Tenney, Minnesota, placed on the National Register of Historic Places, but burnt to the ground in 2010
- Tenney Homestead, Stow, Massachusetts, on the National Register of Historic Places
- Tenney House and Groveland Hotel, Federal Point, Florida, on the National Register of Historic Places
- Tenney Stadium, a multi-purpose facility at Leonidoff Field, Poughkeepsie, New York

=== Antarctica ===
- Mount Tenney
