= Caleb Brantley =

American football player (born 1994)

No. 99
- Position: Defensive tackle

Personal information
- Born: September 2, 1994 (age 32); Crescent City, Florida, U.S.
- Listed height: 6 ft 2 in (1.88 m)
- Listed weight: 305 lb (138 kg)

Career information
- High school: Crescent City
- College: Florida (2013-2016)
- NFL draft: 2017: 6th round, 185th overall pick

Career history
- Cleveland Browns (2017); Washington Redskins / Football Team (2018–2020)

Awards and highlights
- Second-team All-SEC (2016)

Career NFL statistics
- Total tackles: 19
- Sacks: 2.0
- Fumble recoveries: 1
- Stats at Pro Football Reference

Caleb Dantrell Brantley (born September 2, 1994) is an American former professional football player who was a defensive tackle in the National Football League (NFL). He played college football for the Florida Gators and was selected by the Cleveland Browns in the sixth round of the 2017 NFL draft. He was also a member of the Washington Redskins / Football Team.

== Early life ==
Brantley attended Crescent City High School in Crescent City, Florida. As a senior, he had 94 tackles and five sacks. A 4-star defensive tackle recruit, Brantley committed to Florida to play college football over offers from Alabama, Auburn, California, Florida A&M, Florida State, Miami, Ole Miss, Purdue, South Florida, Tennessee, and USC.

== College career ==
After redshirting his first year at the University of Florida in 2013, Brantley played in all 12 games in 2014 and had 21 tackles. As a sophomore in 2015, he appeared in 13 games with 10 starts and recorded 28 tackles and three sacks. As a junior in 2016, he had 31 tackles and 2.5 sacks. After the season, Brantley decided to forgo his senior year and enter the 2017 NFL draft.

== Professional career ==
Pre-draft measurables
Height	Weight	Arm length	Hand span	Wingspan	40-yard dash	10-yard split	20-yard split	20-yard shuttle	Three-cone drill	Vertical jump	Broad jump	Bench press
6 ft 2 5/8 in (1.90 m)	307 lb (139 kg)	32 in (0.81 m)	9 3/4 in (0.25 m)	6 ft 5 1/8 in (1.96 m)	5.14 s	1.78 s	2.97 s	4.62 s	7.66 s	27.0 in (0.69 m)	8 ft 9 in (2.67 m)	21 reps
All values from NFL Combine

=== Cleveland Browns ===
Brantley was projected as an early second round pick. Due to pending criminal charges, he dropped to the sixth round before he was drafted 185th overall by the Cleveland Browns in the 2017 NFL Draft. The charges were dropped on May 17, 2017, with Brantley signing a four-year contract with the team a day later. Brantley was waived on September 1, 2018.

=== Washington Redskins / Football Team ===
On September 3, 2018, Brantley was signed by the Washington Redskins. He was placed on injured reserve on September 13, 2019. On March 23, 2020, Brantley re-signed with the team. He chose to opt-out of the 2020 NFL season due to the COVID-19 pandemic. Brantley was released on April 9, 2021.
