= Clarence "Pooh Bear" Williams =

American football player (1975–2022)

Clarence Williams
No. 39
- Position: Fullback

Personal information
- Born: January 20, 1975; Crescent City, Florida. U.S.
- Died: February 17, 2022 (aged 47); Crescent City, Florida, U.S.
- Listed height: 6 ft 1 in (1.85 m)
- Listed weight: 265 lb (120 kg)

Career information
- High school: Crescent City (Crescent City, Florida)
- College: Florida State
- NFL draft: 1997: undrafted
- Expansion draft: 1999: 1st round, 32nd overall pick

Career history
- Buffalo Bills (1998); Cleveland Browns (1999)*
- * Offseason or practice squad member only

Awards and highlights
- National champion (1993)
- Stats at Pro Football Reference

Clarence "Pooh Bear" Williams (January 20, 1975 – February 17, 2022) was an American professional football player who was a running back for the Buffalo Bills in the National Football League (NFL). He played college football for the Florida State Seminoles. He attended Crescent City High School in Crescent City, Florida, where he rushed for 5,090 yards, the seventh most in Florida high school history at the time.

Williams's grandmother nicknamed him "Pooh Bear" when he was a child due to his resemblance to Winnie-the-Pooh.

Williams played at Florida State from 1993 to 1996, rushing for 427 yards and scoring 17 touchdowns during his time there. After graduating, Williams went undrafted, but was signed by the Buffalo Bills. Williams had a brief career in the NFL during the 1998 season, appearing in 3 games and rushing for 5 yards over 2 carries.

From 2016 to 2019, Williams was head varsity football coach at Crescent City High School. In 2021, he began work as the defensive backs coach for Palatka High School.

Williams died in a traffic collision in Crescent City on February 17, 2022, at the age of 47.
