= CCJSHS =

CCJSHS may refer to:

- Coahoma County Junior-Senior High School
- Crescent City High School (or Crescent City Junior-Senior High School)
