= National Register of Historic Places listings in Hardee County, Florida =

Location of Hardee County in Florida

This is a list of the National Register of Historic Places listings in Hardee County, Florida.

This is intended to be a complete list of the properties and districts on the National Register of Historic Places in Hardee County, Florida, United States. The locations of National Register properties and districts for which the latitude and longitude coordinates are included below, may be seen in a map.

There are 3 properties and districts listed on the National Register in the county.

This National Park Service list is complete through NPS recent listings posted March 21, 2025.

Contents: Counties in Florida (non-linked contain no National Register listings)
Alachua - Baker - Bay - Bradford - Brevard - Broward - Calhoun - Charlotte - Citrus - Clay - Collier - Columbia - DeSoto - Dixie - Duval - Escambia - Flagler - Franklin - Gadsden - Gilchrist - Glades - Gulf - Hamilton - Hardee - Hendry - Hernando - Highlands - Hillsborough (Tampa) - Holmes - Indian River - Jackson - Jefferson - Lafayette - Lake - Lee - Leon - Levy - Liberty - Madison - Manatee - Marion - Martin - Miami-Dade (Miami) - Monroe - Nassau - Okaloosa - Okeechobee - Orange - Osceola - Palm Beach - Pasco - Pinellas - Polk - Putnam - St. Johns - St. Lucie - Santa Rosa - Sarasota - Seminole - Sumter - Suwannee - Taylor - Union - Volusia - Wakulla - Walton - Washington

== Current listings ==
	Name on the Register	Image	Date listed	Location	City or town	Description
1	Albert Carlton Estate	Albert Carlton Estate	October 3, 1991 (#91000893)	302 East Bay Street; 27°32′44″N 81°48′32″W	Wauchula	
2	Downtown Wauchula Historic District	Downtown Wauchula Historic District	June 18, 2018 (#100002568)	Roughly bounded by W Palmetto & W Orange Sts., N 4th & N Florida Aves. 27°32′51″N 81°48′42″W	Wauchula	
3	Payne's Creek Massacre-Fort Chokonikla Site	Payne's Creek Massacre-Fort Chokonikla Site	November 21, 1978 (#78000944)	Paynes Creek Historic State Park; 27°37′33″N 81°48′14″W	Bowling Green	

== See also ==
- List of National Historic Landmarks in Florida
- National Register of Historic Places listings in Florida
