= Downtown Wauchula Historic District =

Historic district in Wauchula, Florida, US

Coordinates: 27.5475°N 81.8118°W

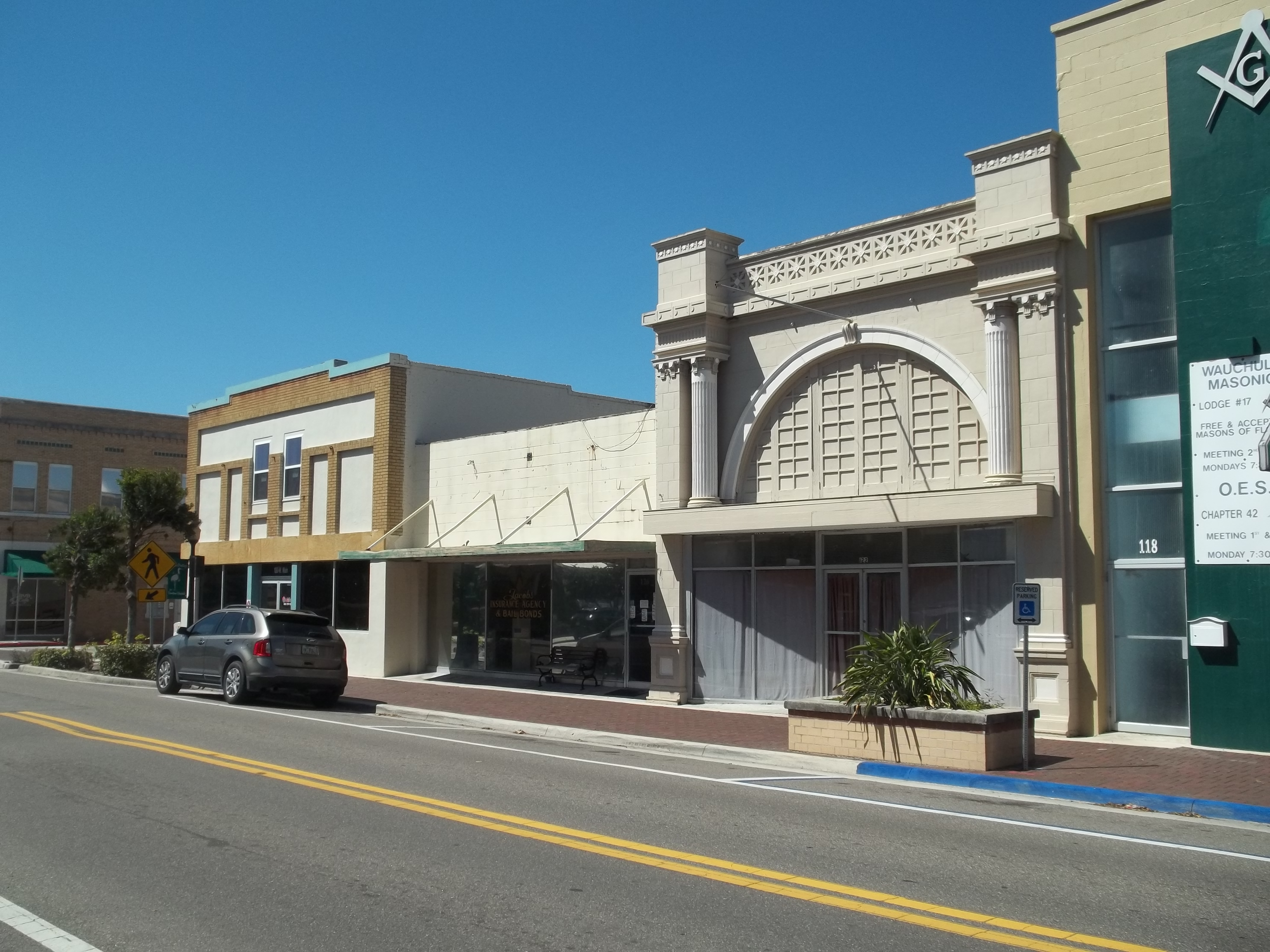
Reif Hardware building

The Downtown Wauchula Historic District is a historic district in Wauchula, a city of about 5,000 people that is the county seat of Hardee County, Florida, United States. The area developed as a hub for surrounding vegetable, citrus, and cattle production. The Florida Southern Railway connected to Wauchula in 1886. The town grew and became the county seat in 1921. It was added to the National Register of Historic Places in August 2018.

The district include 14 blocks and various architectural styles. Heritage Park was established downtown. The downtown is part of the Florida Main Street Program.

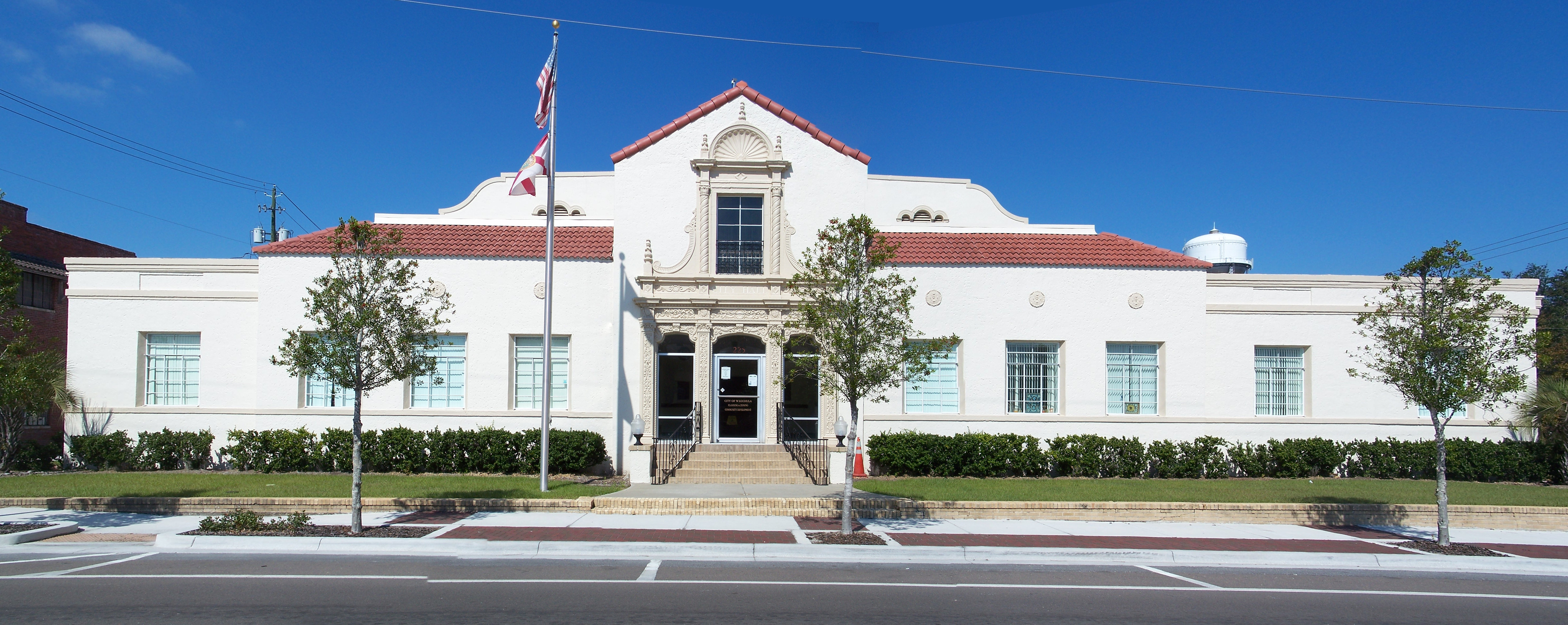
Former city hall

City Hall, built in 1926, is in the district. It was designed by M. Leo Elliot. A historical marker commemorates its history.

The former Hardee County Trust Company building, later home to Reif Hardware, is on Main Street.

== Gallery ==
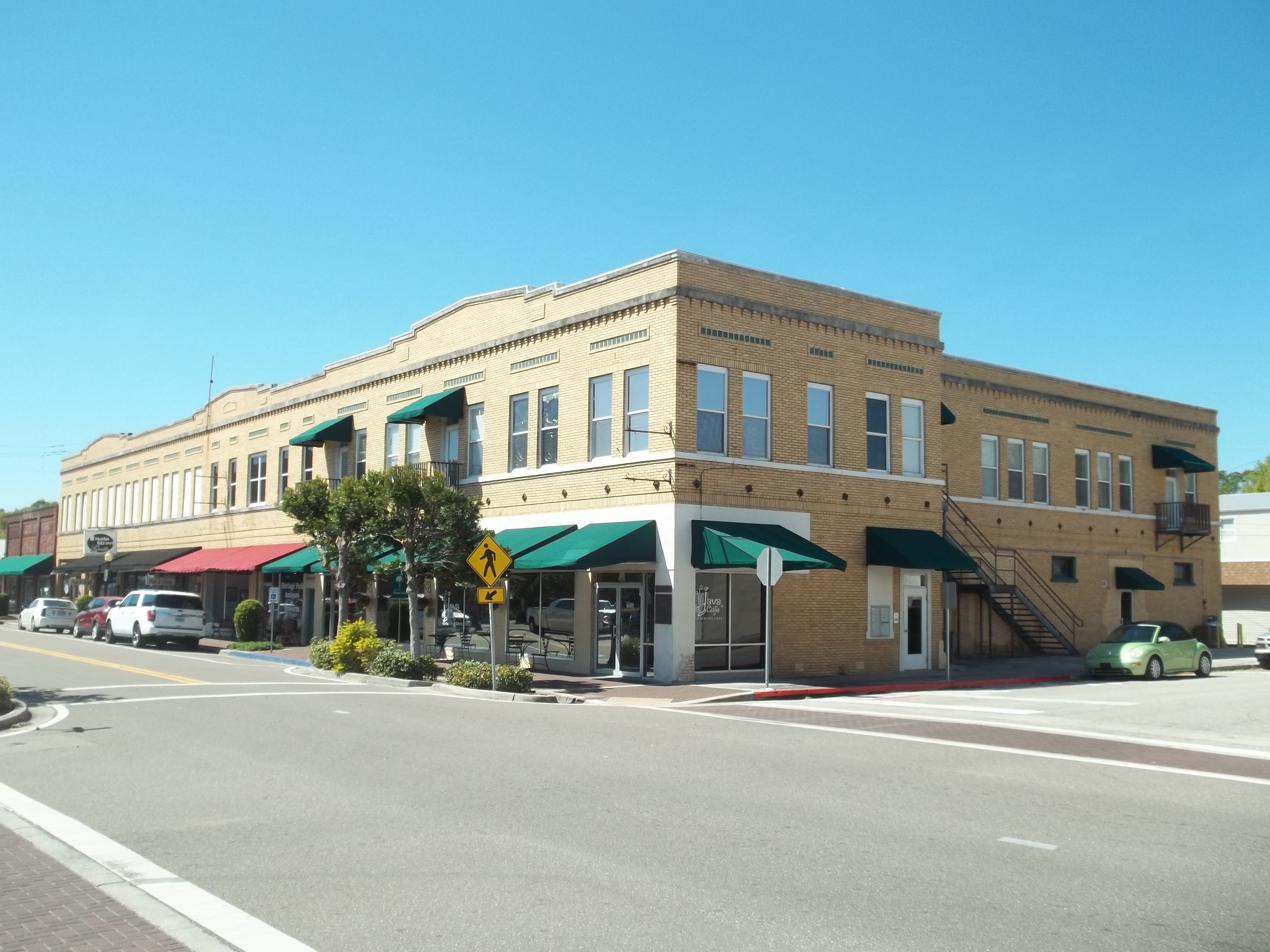
Downtown Wauchula

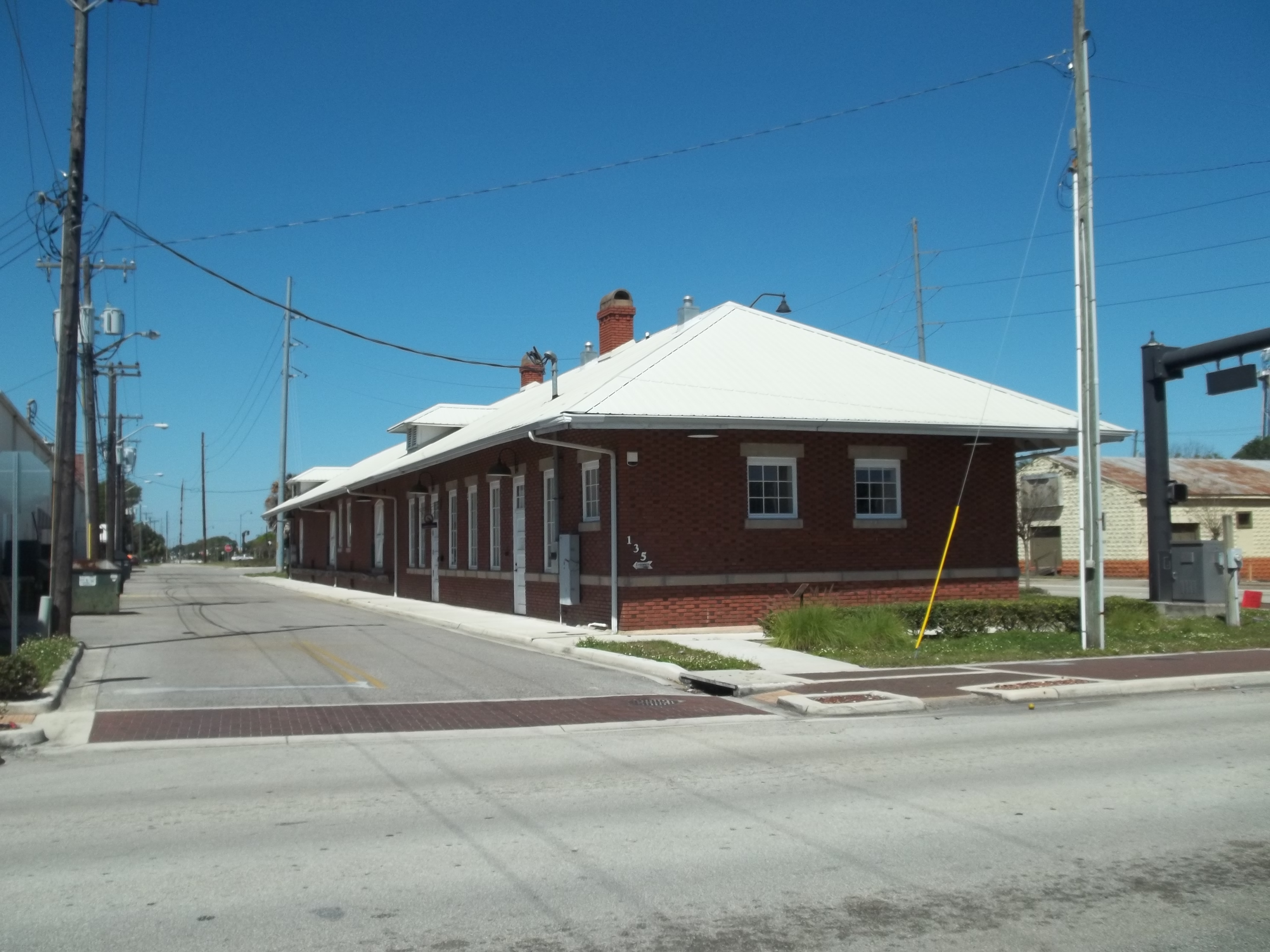
Old train depot

== See also ==
- National Register of Historic Places listings in Hardee County, Florida
