= Don Herndon =

American football player (1936–2009)

No. 20
- Position: Halfback

Personal information
- Born: June 4, 1936; Wauchula, Florida, U.S.
- Died: January 10, 2009 (aged 72); Lakeland, Florida, U.S.
- Listed height: 6 ft 0 in (1.83 m)
- Listed weight: 195 lb (88 kg)

Career information
- High school: Hardee (Wauchula)
- College: Tampa
- NFL draft: 1958: 13th round, 153rd overall pick

Career history
- New York Titans (1960)

Awards and highlights
- All-American

Career AFL statistics
- Receptions: 5
- Receiving yards: 57
- Touchdowns: 1
- Stats at Pro Football Reference

Donald Eugene Herndon (June 4, 1936 – January 10, 2009) was an American professional football player who was a halfback for the New York Titans of the American Football League (AFL) in 1960. He played college football for the Tampa Spartans.
