= AdventHealth Wauchula =

- AdventHealth

Geography
- Location: 735 South 5th Avenue, Wauchula, Florida, United States
- Coordinates: 27°32′22″N 81°48′26″W

Organization
- Care system: Private hospital
- Type: General hospital
- Religious affiliation: Seventh-day Adventist Church

Services
- Standards: Joint Commission
- Emergency department: Yes
- Beds: 25

Helipads
- Helipad: No

History
- Former names: Hardee Memorial Hospital; Florida Hospital Wauchula
- Constructed: 1968 and May 31, 2016
- Opened: 1970 and December 21, 2017
- Closed: 1992

Links
- Website: www.adventhealth.com/hospital/adventhealth-wauchula
- Lists: Hospitals in Florida

Adventist Health System-Sunbelt, Inc. (doing business as AdventHealth Wauchula) is a non-profit hospital in Wauchula, Florida, United States owned by AdventHealth. The medical facility is a critical access hospital and a statutory rural hospital. In 1988, the hospital received national attention after it was revealed that two babies were switched at birth there in 1978. In 2019, AdventHealth Wauchula received a bomb threat that forced it to evacuate.

== History ==
In 1968, construction began on the first hospital in Wauchula, Florida. In 1970, Hardee Memorial Hospital opened. In late July 1992, hospital filed for Chapter 11 bankruptcy protection with the United States Bankruptcy Court in Tampa. The Chapter 11 bankruptcy protection had nothing to do with the baby-swap incident. Also in July 1992, the only physician who worked at the hospital quit their job and the medical facility closed later that month. When the hospital closed it had been going by the name Crest Medical Center. In 1994, Adventist Health System had reopened it as Walker Memorial Hospital Wauchula.

On May 31, 2016, there was a groundbreaking for a new hospital. The new 50,000 square foot (4,600 m^{2}) facility was being built on U.S. Route 17 for $32 million about 0.75 miles (1.21 km) to the northeast. It would have twenty-five beds, a fifteen-bed emergency department and extensive therapy rooms. On December 21, 2017, Florida Hospital Wauchula opened. In 2018, the Hardee County Industrial Development Authority purchased the old location for $2 million.

On January 2, 2019, Florida Hospital Wauchula rebranded to AdventHealth Wauchula. On November 8, the hospital received a bomb threat forcing it to evacuate all of its patients and employees. First responders from Desoto County, Hardee County, Highlands County, Manatee County, Polk County, Florida Highway Patrol and the Florida Fish and Wildlife Conservation Commission all responded to a 911 call from the hospital. But they could not find a bomb in the facility.

On January 1, 2021, all hospitals were required to have their chargemaster on its website by the Centers for Medicare & Medicaid Services. In a 2022, survey most hospitals in Florida, including AdventHealth Wauchula, were found to have failed to comply with the Hospital Price Transparency Law; the hospital came into full compliance with the law in February 2023.

== Baby-swap incident and aftermath ==
In December 1978, babies Arlena Twigg and Kimberly Michelle May, were born at Hardee Memorial Hospital, they were inadvertently switched, unknown to their parents at the time.

In early September 1988, Ernest and Regina Twigg of Sebring, Florida, filed a lawsuit against Hardee Memorial Hospital and four of its employees in a United States District Court in Tampa for $100 million. They did this after a genetic test on Arlena, before she died in August 1988 from a congenital heart defect, revealed that she was not their daughter. The Twiggs asked the Federal Bureau of Investigation to investigate Hardee Memorial Hospital, which they did, finding that no federal crime had been committed.

In 1989, the Twiggs filed a lawsuit against Robert Mays of Sarasota, Florida to seek custody of Kimberly Mays; after almost a year they agreed to drop their custody lawsuit if a genetic test was done on Kimberly. Originally Robert Mays had refused to submit Kimberly to a genetic test. When the genetic test was carried out on Robert and Kimberly by Johns Hopkins University, it found that Kimberly was, to 99.9 percent probability, the daughter of the Twiggs.

In 1991, Hardee Memorial Hospital agreed to settle the lawsuit for $3.5 million to $7 million. Also in late August 1992, the hospital agreed to settle a lawsuit by Robert Mays and daughter Kimberly Mays for $6.6 million. The money would be paid out from the Florida Patient's Compensation Fund, which was created by Florida hospitals to pay for lawsuits by patients.

In late August 1993, Kimberly Mays successfully divorced the Twiggs, when Circuit Judge Stephen Dakan refused to order her to see them. In late November 1993, the Twiggs asked for a criminal probe into the baby-swap. They did this after Patsy Webb, a former nurses' aid from Hardee Memorial Hospital, had said that a physician told her to switch Arlena and Kimberly. And that she had refused the request of the physician and that the following day they had been switched. Later Robert May had been investigated by the Federal Bureau of Investigation, and took a polygraph test, which he passed.

No criminal probe was planned, since the claim by Patsy Webb was considered a tall tale. During the custody hearing for Kimberly, Webb said in court that she knew nothing of the switch.

In March 1994, Kimberly Mays ran away from home and was found later by Sarasota police at the YMCA, she later moved in with the Twiggs. In early May 1994, the Twiggs, Robert Mays and Kimberly were back in the courtroom of Circuit Judge Stephen Dakan. He overturned his August 1993 decision, granting both the Twiggs and Robert Mays guardianship of Kimberly.

== Awards and recognitions ==
The hospital was recognized by The Leapfrog Group as a top rural hospital from 2017 to 2021.

AdventHealth Wauchula received from the Centers for Medicare & Medicaid Services a five-star rating from 2020 to 2021.

== See also ==
- List of Seventh-day Adventist hospitals
- Switched at Birth (1991 film)
