= Hardee High School =

Hardee Senior High School
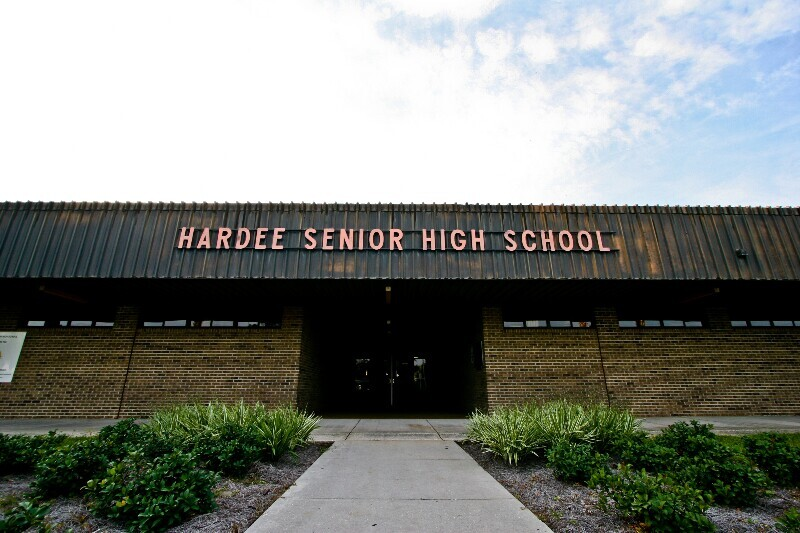

Location
- 830 Altman Road; Wauchula, Florida 33873; United States; 27°31′44″N 81°50′06″W

Information
- Type: Public
- School district: Hardee County School District
- Principal: Travis Tubbs Donna Block, Assistant Chad Douglas, Assistant
- Grades: 9-12
- Enrollment: 1,335 (2023-2024)
- Colors: Orange & blue
- Mascot: Wildcats
- Website: www.hardee.k12.fl.us/o/hhs

Hardee High School, originally Wauchula High School, is a public high school in Wauchula, Florida, United States.

== History ==
Wauchula High School, the predecessor of today's Hardee County High School, was the first high school to serve students in the Wauchula area. On August 4, 1903, the school, located on South 8th Avenue and Bay Street, Wauchula, which had been built by the Masons in 1895, became a county high school. The first commencement class, consisting of three girls and one boy, graduated from Wauchula High School on March 20, 1906.

In 1909, a new building, was constructed and housed all grades. In 1915, the west wing of the high school was opened.

In the spring of 1926, a new high school, bounded by Bay Street on the north, west by Dixie Highway and east by 11th Avenue, was opened. In the late 1930s or early 1940s, the school's name was changed to Hardee County High School. In 1945, the school building burned to the ground and forced the school district to find a temporary location for students to earn their education while a new high school building was designed and constructed on Florida Avenue, Wauchula. The new school building opened in the fall of 1949.

In 1981, the newest high school facility was built and remains the single brick and mortar high school serving Hardee County students. Located on Altman Road in Wauchula, the current Hardee High facility consists of 14 mostly brown brick buildings nestled among large oak trees on a 35-acre plot of land donated by the Doyle E. Carlton, Jr. family.

In June 2021, Hardee High School took on new leadership and now operates under the direction of principal, Tammy Pohl, assistant principal, Mary Sue Maddox, and assistant principal, Heather Culverhouse. Enrollment runs approximately 1325 students throughout the school year with a demographic that is 53% Hispanic, 8% African American, and 39% Caucasian. HHS today is listed as a Title I school, and students receive lunches free of charge.

== Notable alumni ==
- Don Herndon, AFL halfback with the New York Titans in 1960, selected in the 13th round of the 1958 NFL Draft
- Kellon Lindsey, baseball shortstop, selected 23rd overall in the 2024 MLB draft by the Los Angeles Dodgers
- Zeke Mowatt, NFL tight end who won Super Bowl XXI with the New York Giants
