= Tenney Fire Hall =

- U.S. National Register of Historic Places
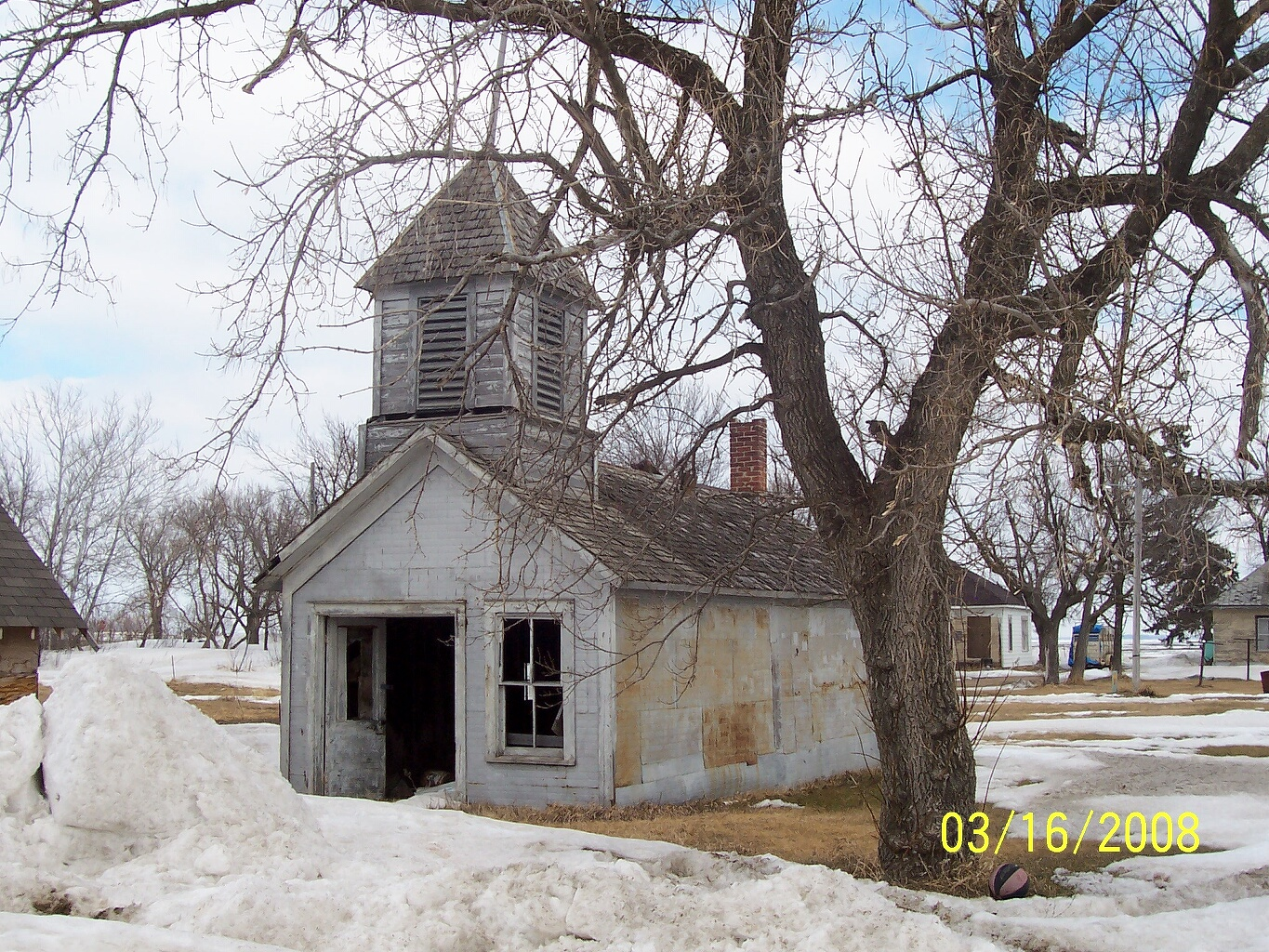
- The Tenney Fire Hall a few years before it burned down

- Location within Minnesota Location within the United States
- Location: 200 Concord Avenue, Tenney, Minnesota
- Coordinates: 46°2′38″N 96°27′12″W
- Area: Less than one acre
- Built: 1904/1918
- Architect: A.W. Haugen
- MPS: Wilkin County MRA
- NRHP reference No.: 80002186
- Added to NRHP: July 17, 1980

The Tenney Fire Hall was a historic fire station in Tenney, Minnesota, United States, built in 1904, but which burned down in 2010. It was listed on the National Register of Historic Places in 1980 for having local significance in the theme of politics/government. It was nominated as an example of the municipal services offered by small villages such as Tenney, which measured only two square blocks. In 2011 the village, which had dwindled to three residents, voted 2–1 to dissolve as a separate municipality and become part of Campbell Township.

== Description ==
The Tenney Fire Hall was a 24-by-14-foot (7.3 m × 4.3 m) wood frame building with sheet metal siding stamped with a brick pattern. The building was characterized by an oversized bell tower with a pyramidal roof and louvered windows. The fire hall originally stood as a sort of miniature version of the similarly-shaped but much larger town hall adjacent.

== History ==
The Fire Hall was built in 1904 to house the town's two hand-drawn fire pumpers. The engines were used in conjunction with a large curbed well with a double stroked pump, an arrangement which was not abandoned until 1924. In 1918 the town jail was moved and added on to the rear of the fire hall, making room for a larger fire pumper.

The building was used for many years as a meeting house, a polling station, and of course as a fire hall and jail. During the 1990s the private owner had hoped to preserve the fire hall and to make it a viable attraction, but his efforts were hamstrung by the state and federal regulations governing the type of actions that can be taken with regard to moving or refurbishing properties on the National Register. In the summer of 2008 an anonymous vandal crashed a vehicle into the fire hall, badly damaging the northwestern corner of the building. In 2010 the fire hall was burned to the ground.

In 2016 the fire hall's original bell was installed in the offices of Bushel, an agriculture supply chain software company, in downtown Fargo, North Dakota.

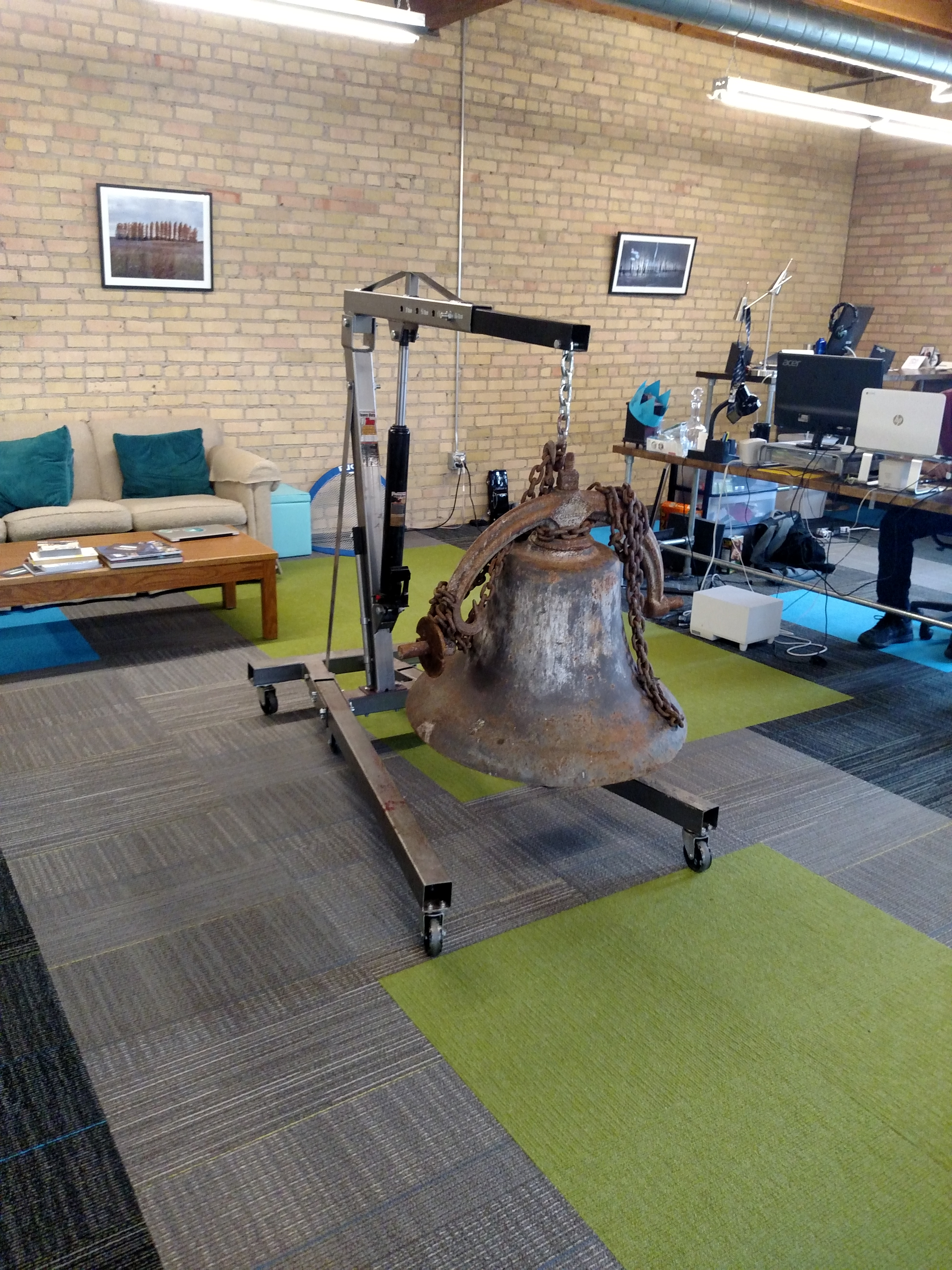
The fire hall's bell being installed at an office in Fargo

== See also ==
- List of fire stations
- National Register of Historic Places listings in Wilkin County, Minnesota
