= Hardee County Courthouse =

Building in Wauchula, Florida

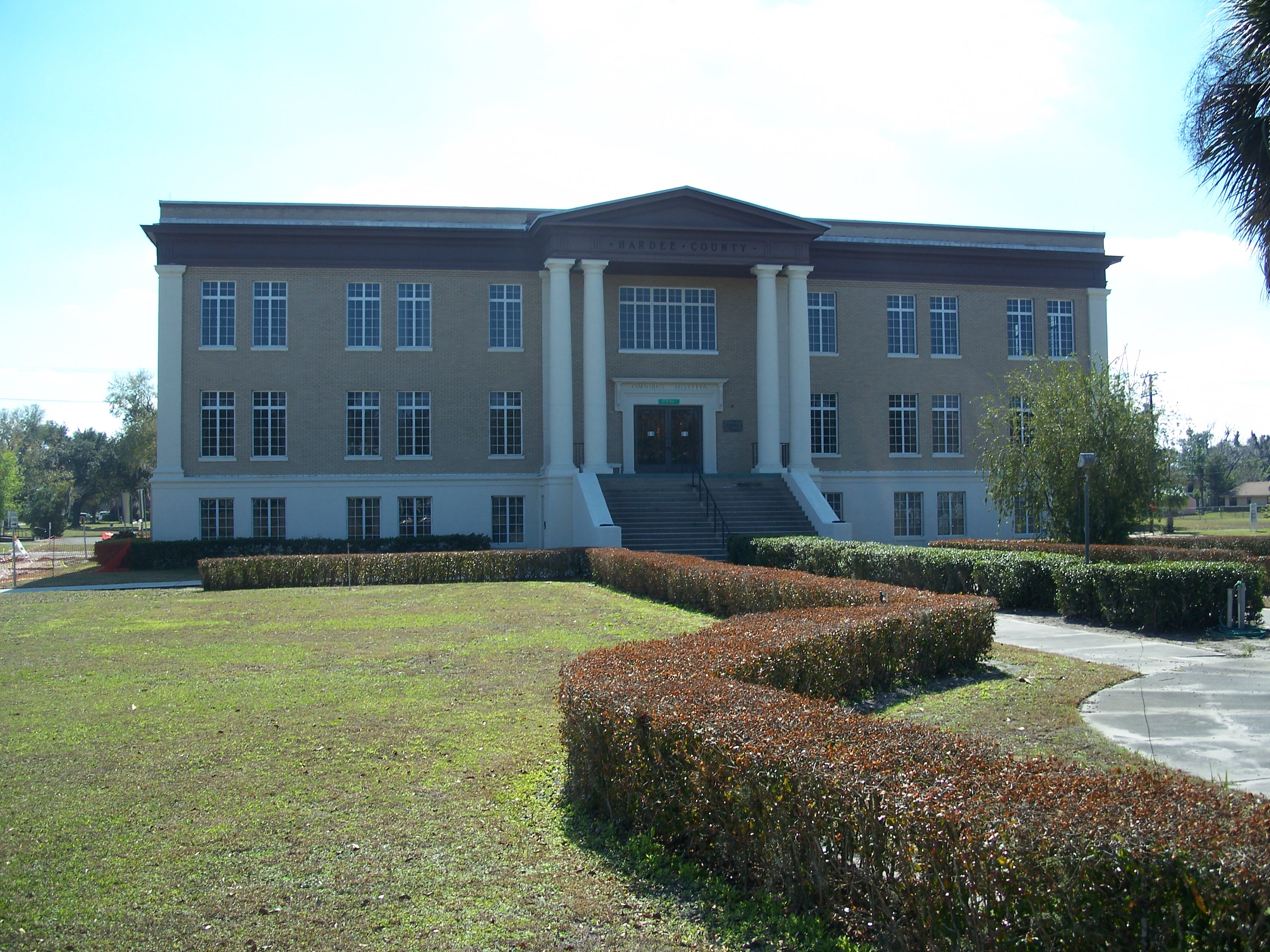
- Interactive map of the Hardee County Courthouse area

General information
- Architectural style: Classical Revival
- Location: 417 West Main St., Wauchula, Florida, United States
- Coordinates: 27.54688°N 81.81533°W
- Completed: 1927
- Client: Hardee County

Design and construction
- Architect: H.G. Little of Wauchula
- Engineer: Builder: Robertson Construction Co.

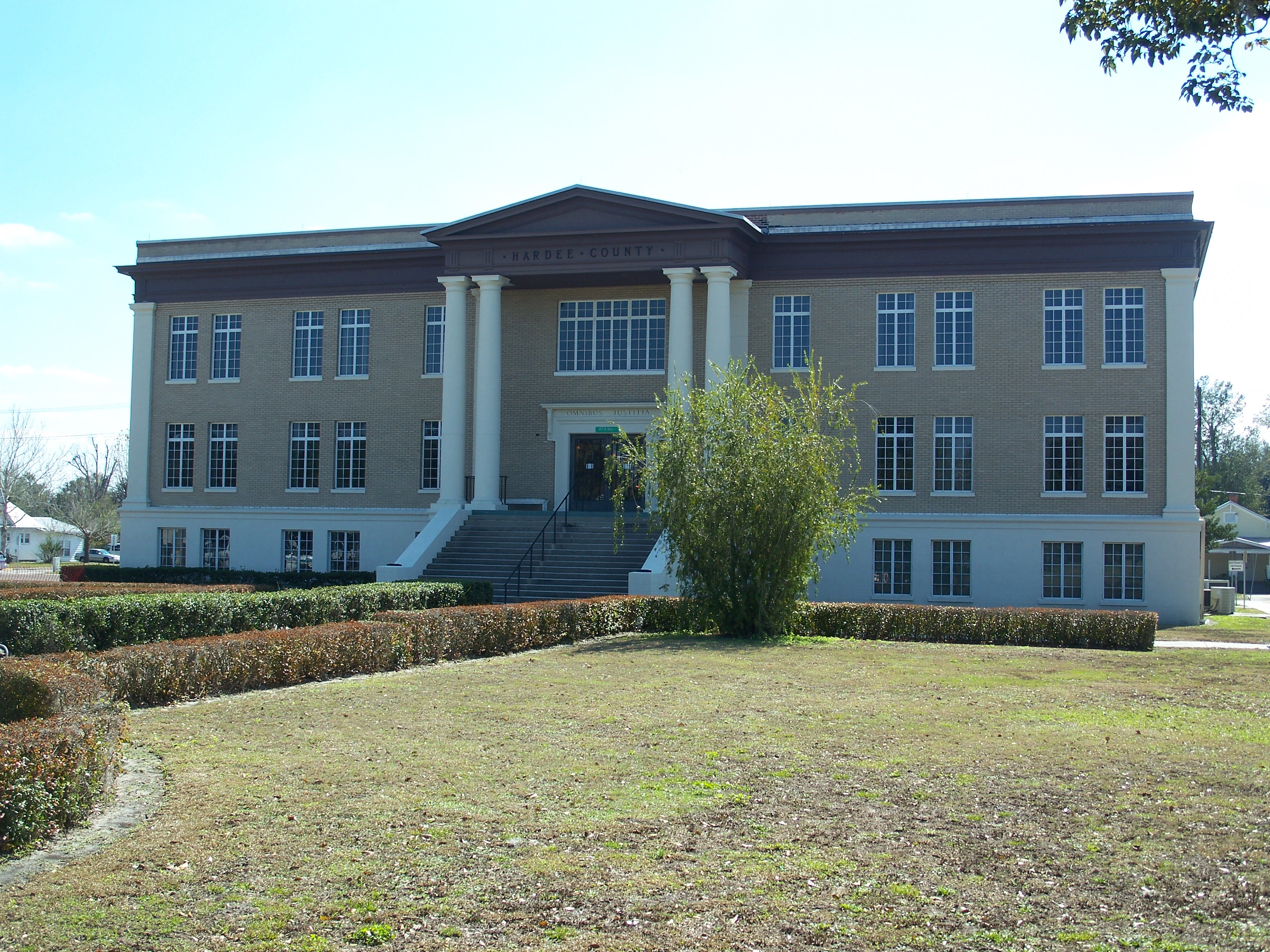

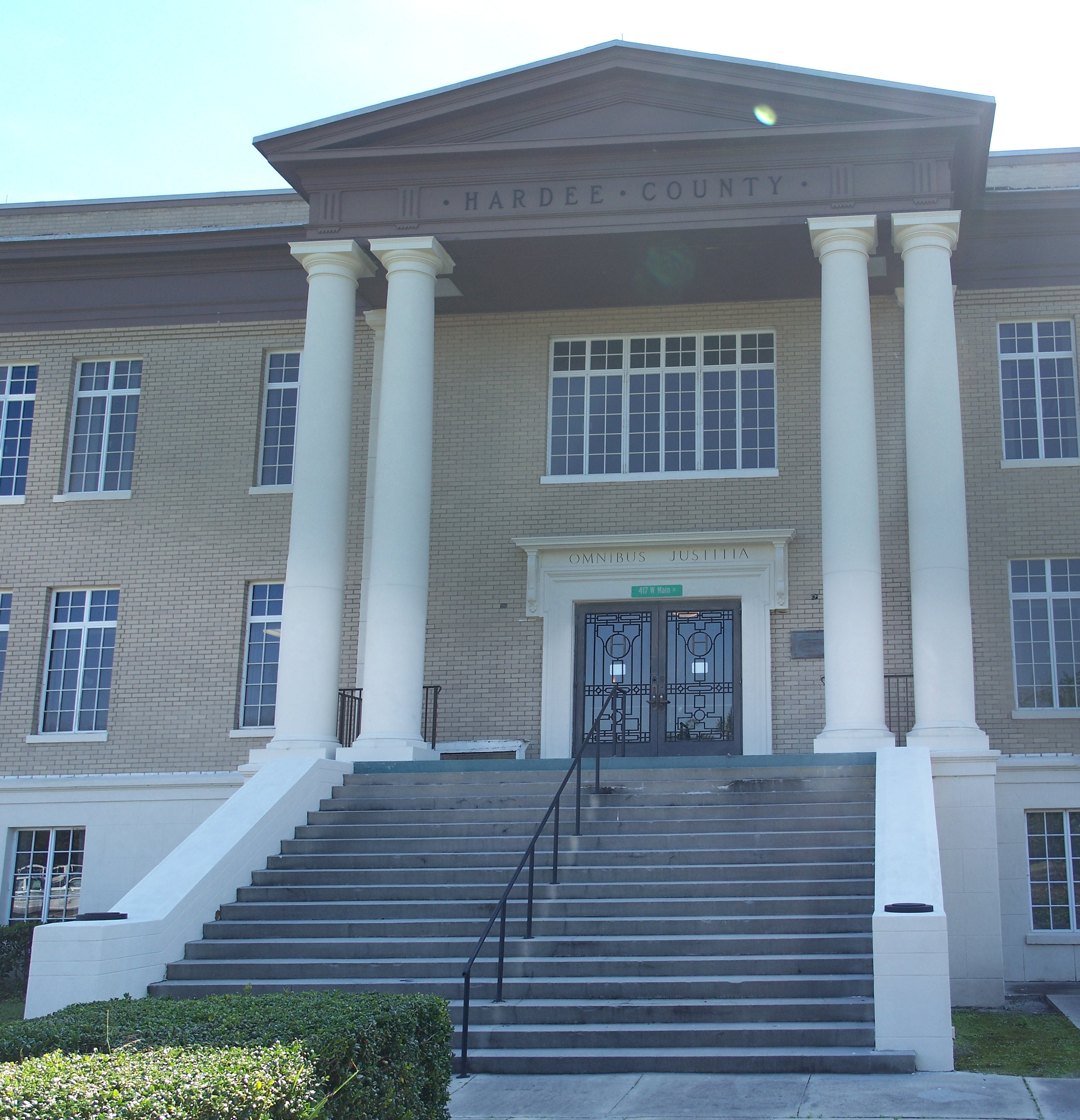

The Hardee County Courthouse, built in 1927, is an historic courthouse building located at 417 West Main Street in Wauchula, Florida. It was designed by architect H.G. Little of Wauchula in the Classical Revival style of architecture. Robertson Construction Co. was the builder. In 1989, the Hardee County Courthouse was listed in A Guide to Florida's Historic Architecture, published by the University of Florida Press.
