= Wauchula Municipal Airport =

Airport in Florida, U.S.

Coordinates: 27°30′53.66″N 081°52′49.67″W

- IATA: none; ICAO: KCHN; FAA LID: CHN

Summary
- Airport type: Public use
- Owner: City of Wauchula
- Operator: Jerry Conerly
- Serves: Wauchula, Florida
- Location: Hardee County, Florida
- Elevation AMSL: 106 ft / 32 m
- Interactive map of Wauchula Municipal Airport

Runways
Direction	Length		Surface
Direction	ft	m	Surface
18/36	4,005	1,221	Asphalt

Statistics
- Aircraft operations (2018): 8,200
- Based aircraft (2022): 24
- Source: Federal Aviation Administration

Wauchula Municipal Airport (ICAO: KCHN, FAA LID: CHN) is a public-use airport located 5 miles (8.0 km) southwest of the central business district of the city of Wauchula in Hardee County, Florida, United States. The airport is publicly owned.

== Facilities and aircraft ==
Wauchula Municipal Airport covers an area of 106 acres (43 ha) at an elevation of 106 feet (32 m) above mean sea level. It has one runway: 18/36 is 4,005 by 75 feet (1,221 x 23 m) asphalt runway.

For the 12-month period ending July 25, 2018, the airport had 8,200 aircraft operations, an average of 22 per day: 100% general aviation. In April 2022, there were 24 aircraft based at this airport: 18 single-engine, 2 multi-engine and 4 helicopter.

== See also ==
- List of airports in Florida
