= Tenney, Minnesota =

Unincorporated community in Minnesota, United States

Tenney
- Unincorporated community
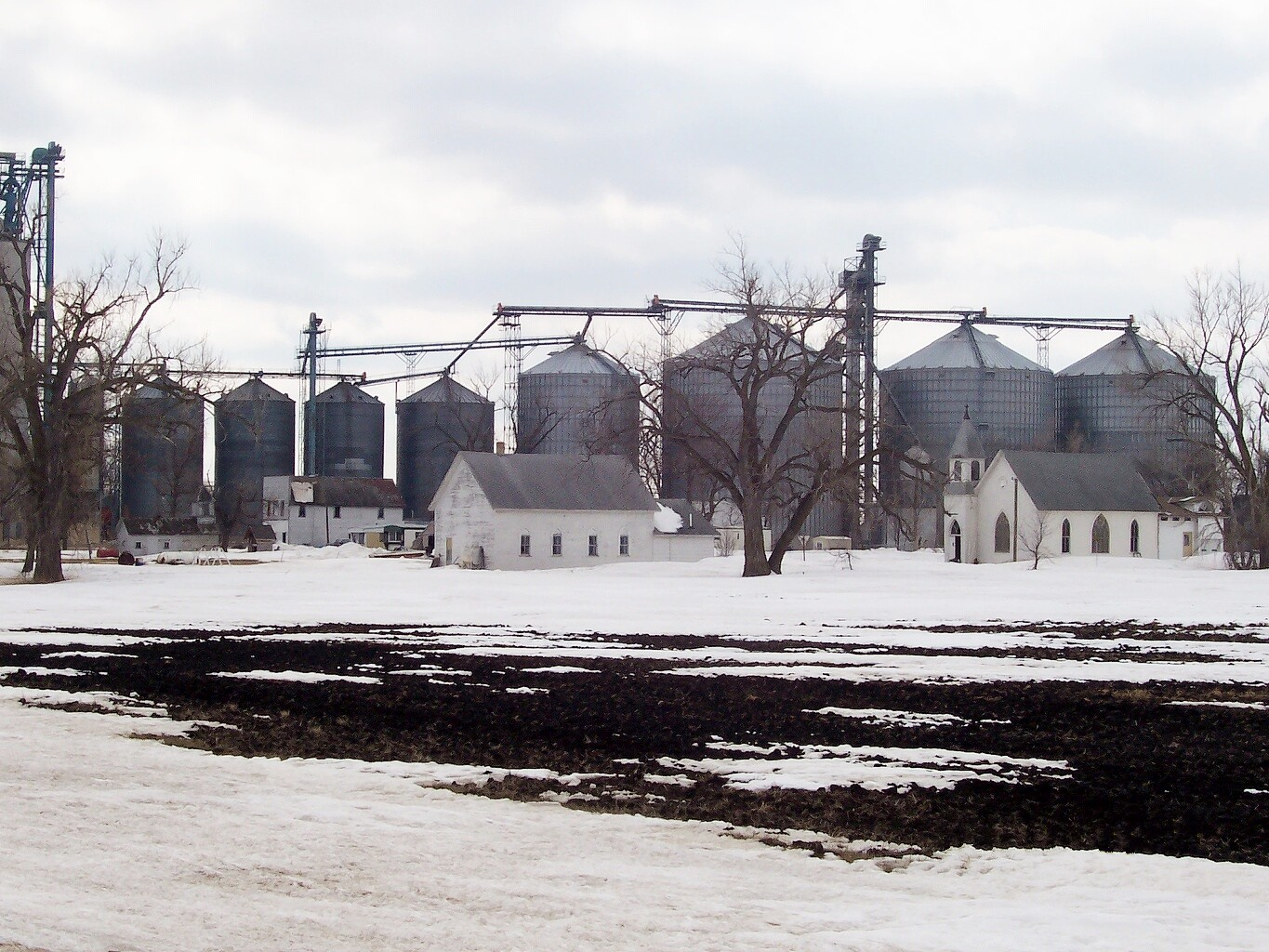
- The community of Tenney, viewed from the northeast. None of the buildings in the foreground remain.

- Location of Tenney, Minnesota
- Coordinates: 46°2′39″N 96°27′15″W
- Country: United States
- State: Minnesota
- County: Wilkin

Government
  - Mayor: Melissa Earl

Area
  - Total: 0.019 sq mi (0.05 km^{2})
  - Land: 0.019 sq mi (0.05 km^{2})
  - Water: 0 sq mi (0 km^{2})
- Elevation: 991 ft (302 m)

Population (2010)
  - Total: 5
  - Density: 250/sq mi (96.5/km^{2})
- Time zone: UTC-6 (Central (CST))
  - Summer (DST): UTC-5 (CDT)
- FIPS code: 27-64426
- GNIS feature ID: 0653086

Tenney is an unincorporated community and former city in section 28 of Campbell Township, Wilkin County, Minnesota, United States. A post office was established there in 1887, and Tenney was incorporated as a city on November 30, 1901. The population was five at the 2010 census, tying Tenney with Funkley as Minnesota's least populous community. It is part of the Wahpeton, ND–MN Micropolitan Statistical Area. The only remnant of Tenney is a grain elevator along the tracks on the south side of town.

== Geography ==
According to the United States Census Bureau, the city has a total area of 0.02 square miles (0.05 km^{2}), all land.

Tenney is located in the flat basin of prehistoric Lake Agassiz, a glacial lake that existed at the end of the last ice age. The area's remarkably flat land is sometimes described as the upper valley of the Red River, though it is not technically in the Red River valley, but is near the Bois de Sioux River.

== History ==
The city of Tenney was named for the owner of its site, lumberman John P. Tenney, because of his willingness to give land to the railroad, which came through in 1885. The first house was built by his son-in-law, Fred Maechler. The post office was established in 1887, the plat was filed for record with the office of the Register of Deeds in Wilkin County on August 4, 1887, and the city was incorporated on November 30, 1901. The city originally encompassed four square miles, but never grew enough to meet its boundaries, so in 1916 the farmers petitioned their land from the city, and their request was granted. According to an unpublished town history written in the mid-1980s, the city's population peaked at about 200 in 1910. Before 1910 the city boasted a church, three grain elevators, a hardware store, two mercantile stores, a butcher shop, bank, machine shop, implement shop, blacksmith shop, pool hall, lumberyard, and a hotel, which also housed the barber shop, saloon, and post office. In 1909 a small post office building was erected and used until 1952, when Leonard Hardie became postmaster and moved the post office to the general store. Electricity arrived in Tenney in 1914, through a franchise granted to Otter Tail Power Company.

After 1910 steady population decline was driven by the lack of significant population in outlying areas, migration to larger urban centers, and the absence of dynamic economic factors to generate wealth. The hardware store closed in 1928 and the bank, like thousands of other undercapitalized small-town banks in the United States, went out of business in 1929 or 1930 in the aftermath of the stock market crash of 1929. U.S. Census bureau data indicates that the population fell to 102 in 1920, 80 in 1930, rose slightly to 89 in 1940, and fell to 62 in 1950, 35 in 1960 and 24 in 1970. As local establishments burned down or went out of business they were not replaced, and finally the post office was discontinued in 1980 when the census bureau pegged Tenney's population at 19. Today the only remaining business in town is the elevator. The last commercial building remaining in town was the former James Bigsby general store (later owned by G. A. Klugman), which also housed the post office until its closing in 1980.

The population reached its lowest point of 2 sometime after the 2000 census, but had risen to 5 by the 2010 census.

In late June 2011, residents of Tenney voted 2 to 1 to dissolve the town and have it become part of Campbell Township.

== Description ==
The community encompassed two and a half blocks, but the elevator is all that remains as of mid-2024.

== Location ==
Tenney is on Minnesota Highway 55 in far western Minnesota. It is approximately 2 miles (3.2 km) east of the junction of Minnesota Highway 55 and U.S. Route 75. It is six miles (10 km) east of Fairmount, North Dakota; 63 miles (101 km) south of Moorhead and 170 miles (270 km) northwest of Minneapolis. It is at roughly the same longitude as Tulsa, Oklahoma and Dallas, and approximately the same latitude as Walla Walla, Washington and Montreal, Quebec.

== Major highways ==
- U.S. Highway 75
- Minnesota State Highway 55

== Points of interest ==
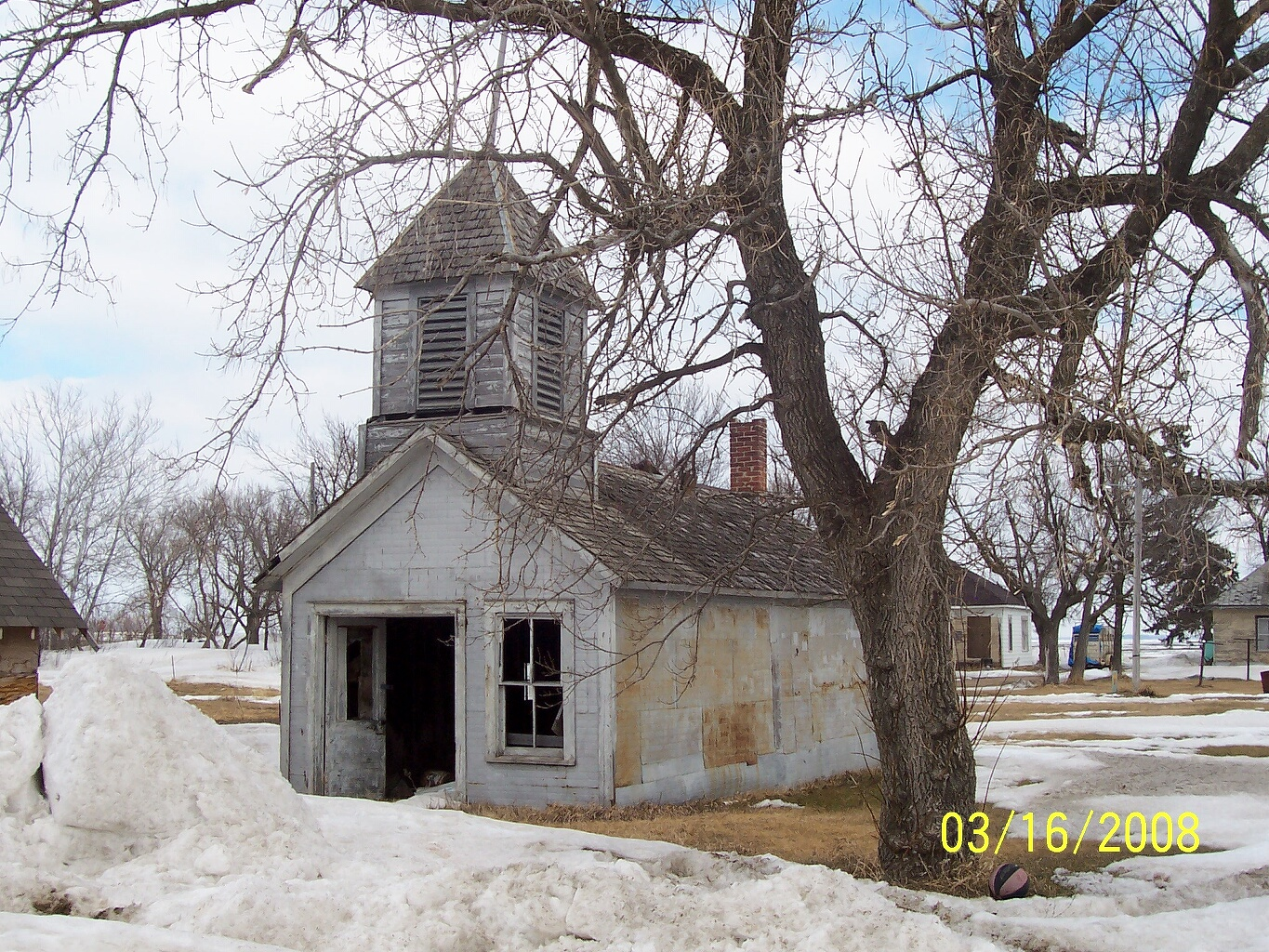
Tenney Fire Hall

=== Tenney Fire Hall ===
The Tenney Fire Hall, listed on the National Register of Historic Places, was a small wood-frame building with a bell tower and flag mast, built in 1904. It housed the town's two hand-pulled chemical fire engines. The rearmost part of the building also contained the town jail. This building had passed into private ownership, but the city had hoped to reacquire it and perform important repairs, but the building no longer stands. According to the National Register's Inventory-Nomination Form, the Fire Hall was significant for the following reasons:

1. "Government functions were often centered in towns, [including] places as small as Tenney with its Fire Hall..."
2. "Though of simple metal-sided, frame construction, the diminutive Tenney Fire Hall...is a visual landmark in the small town."

=== City Hall ===
The City Hall was at 295 Concord Avenue (the town's main north–south street). It was open to the public 24 hours a day and 365 days a year, and visitors were invited to go inside and sign the town's guestbook. City Hall was built in the early 1900s as a community church. Later it was a Baptist church. From 1914 to 1946 it was the Evangelical church, from 1946 to 1968 the Evangelical United Brethren church, and from 1968 until closing in 1997 it was the Tenney United Methodist Church. The building was purchased in 1999 and had been renovated and expanded in 2006 / 2007, but has since disappeared from the landscape.

=== The Wheaton-Dumont Cooperative Elevator ===
The Co-op had its primary rail terminal in Tenney. In 2003, 20 million bushels of grain were trucked into Tenney from other elevators and shipped out by rail. At that time it was estimated that in 2004 this figure would rise to 32 million bushels. The elevator is served by the Soo Line Railroad, which is the United States arm of the Canadian Pacific Railway.

== Demographics ==
Historical population
| Census | Pop. | Note | %± |
|---|---|---|---|
| 1910 | 185 | | — |
| 1920 | 102 | | −44.9% |
| 1930 | 80 | | −21.6% |
| 1940 | 89 | | 11.3% |
| 1950 | 62 | | −30.3% |
| 1960 | 35 | | −43.5% |
| 1970 | 24 | | −31.4% |
| 1980 | 19 | | −20.8% |
| 1990 | 4 | | −78.9% |
| 2000 | 6 | | 50.0% |
| 2010 | 5 | | −16.7% |
U.S. Decennial Census

=== 2010 census ===
As of the census of 2010, there were 5 people, 2 households, and 2 families residing in the city. The population density was 250.0 inhabitants per square mile (96.5/km^{2}). There were 9 housing units at an average density of 450.0 per square mile (173.7/km^{2}). The racial makeup of the city was 100.0% White.

There were 2 households, out of which 100.0% were married couples living together. 0.0% of all households were made up of individuals. The average household size was 2.50 and the average family size was 2.50.

The median age in the city was 56.5 years. 0.0% of residents were under the age of 18; 20% were between the ages of 18 and 24; 0.0% were from 25 to 44; 40% were from 45 to 64; and 40% were 65 years of age or older. The gender makeup of the city was 60.0% male and 40.0% female.

=== 2000 census ===
As of the census of 2000, there were 6 people, 4 households, and 2 families residing in the city. The population density was 115.8/km^{2}; (298.0/sq mi;). There were 8 housing units at an average density of 154.4/km^{2}; (397.3/sq mi;). The racial makeup of the city was 100.00% White.

There were 4 households, out of which none had children under the age of 18 living with them, 50.0% were married couples living together, and 50.0% were non-families. 50.0% of all households were made up of individuals, and 50.0% had someone living alone who was 65 years of age or older. The average household size was 1.50 and the average family size was 2.00.

In the city the population was spread out, with 33.3% from 25 to 44, 33.3% from 45 to 64, and 33.3% who were 65 years of age or older. The median age was 61 years. For every 100 females, there were 100.0 males. For every 100 females age 18 and over, there were 100.0 males.

The median income for a household in the city was $8,750, and the median income for a family was $0. Males had a median income of $0 versus $0 for females. The per capita income for the city was $8,000. All of the population and none of the families were below the poverty line. None of those under the age of 18 and all of those 65 and older were living below the poverty line.
