= Hubbard House (Crescent City, Florida) =

Historic house in Florida, United States

- U.S. National Register of Historic Places
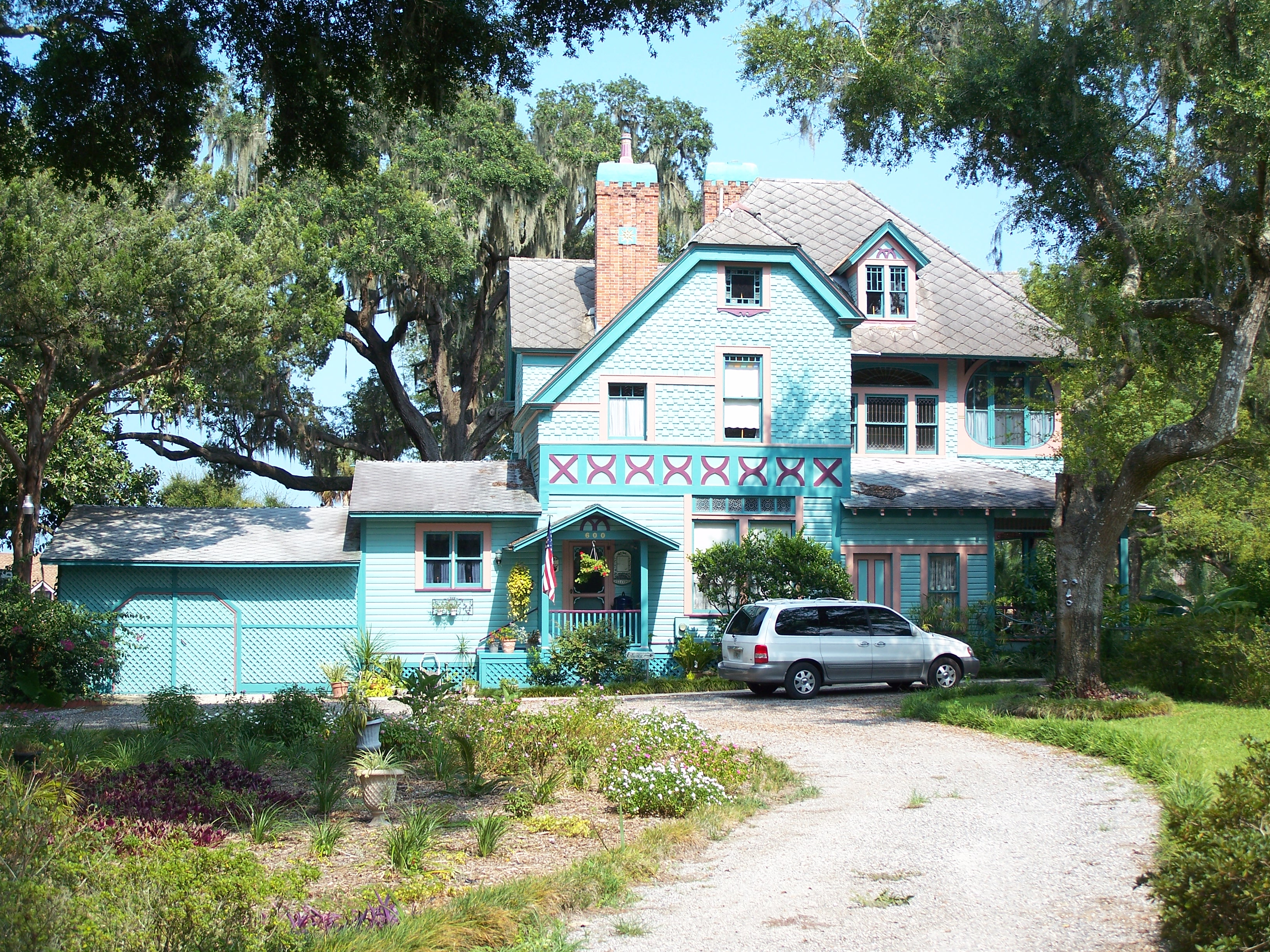

- Location within Florida Location within the United States
- Location: Crescent City, Florida United States
- Coordinates: 29°26′2″N 81°30′22″W
- Area: less than ten acres
- Built: 1877
- Architect: Henry G. Hubbard
- Architectural style: Frame Vernacular with Queen Anne and Shingle-style elements
- NRHP reference No.: 73000601
- Added to NRHP: August 14, 1973

The Hubbard House (also known as San Sui) is a historic house in Crescent City, Florida, United States. It is located at 600 North Park Street.

== Description and history ==
On August 14, 1973, it was added to the National Register of Historic Places.

== Gallery ==
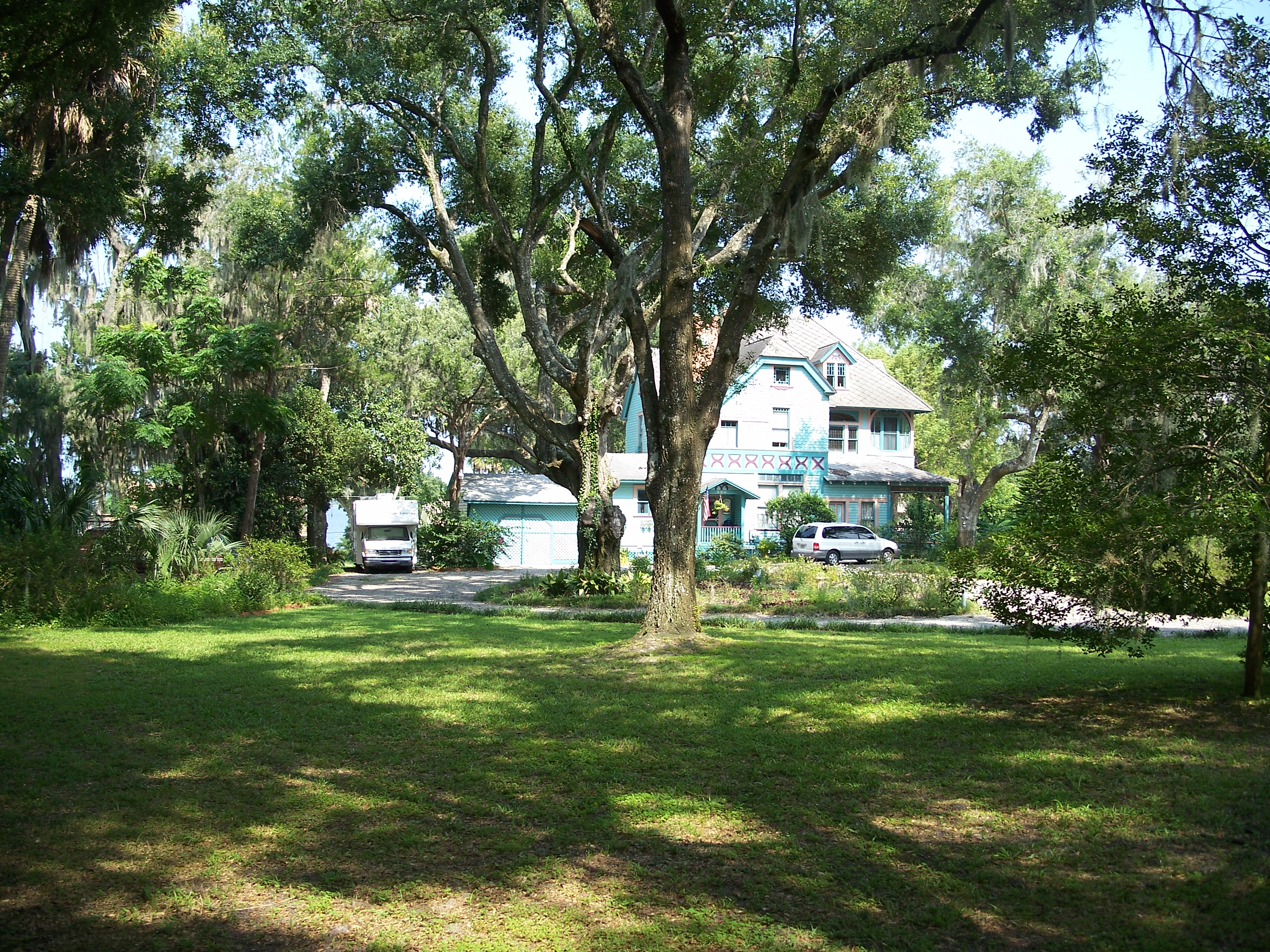

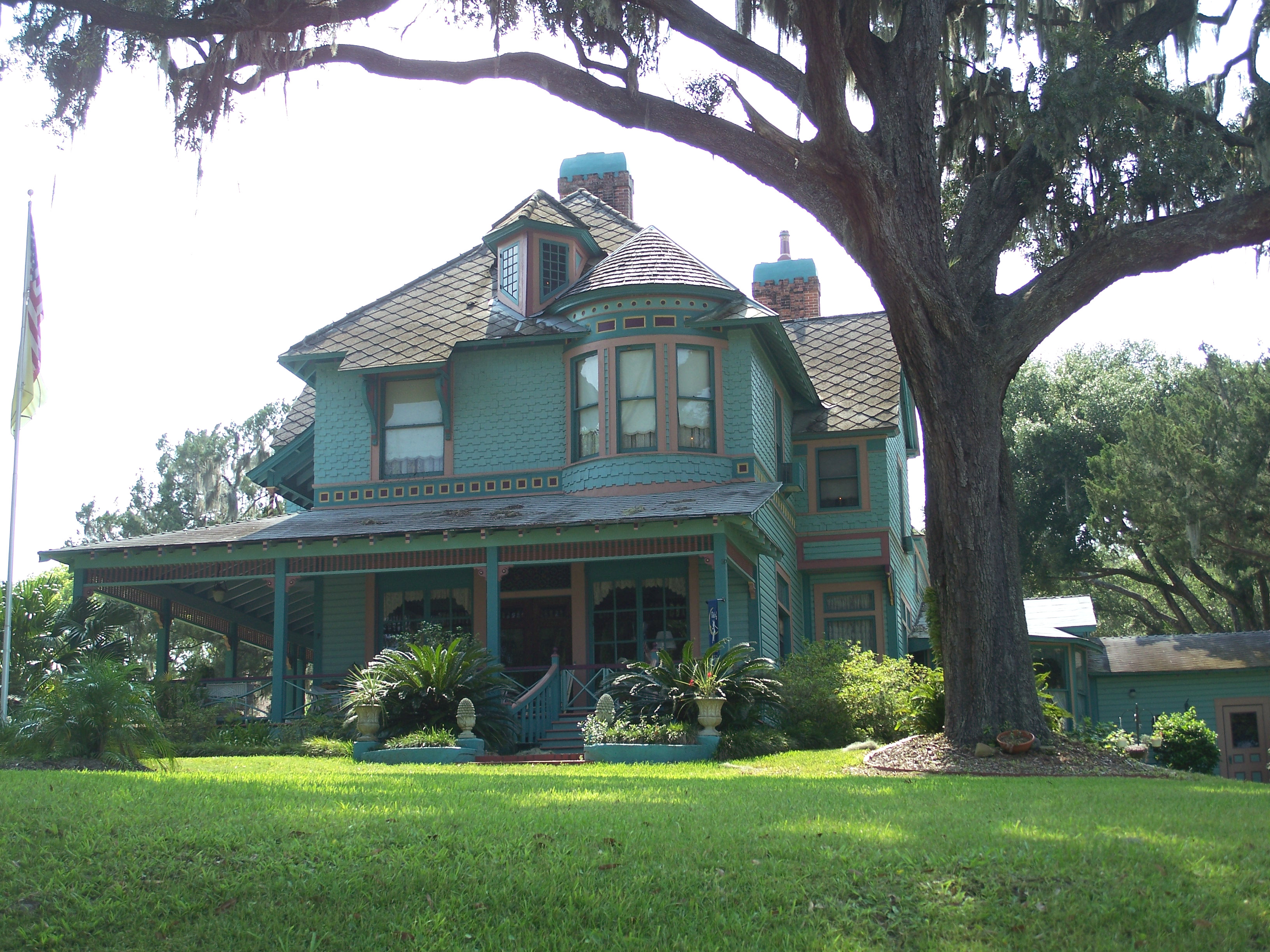

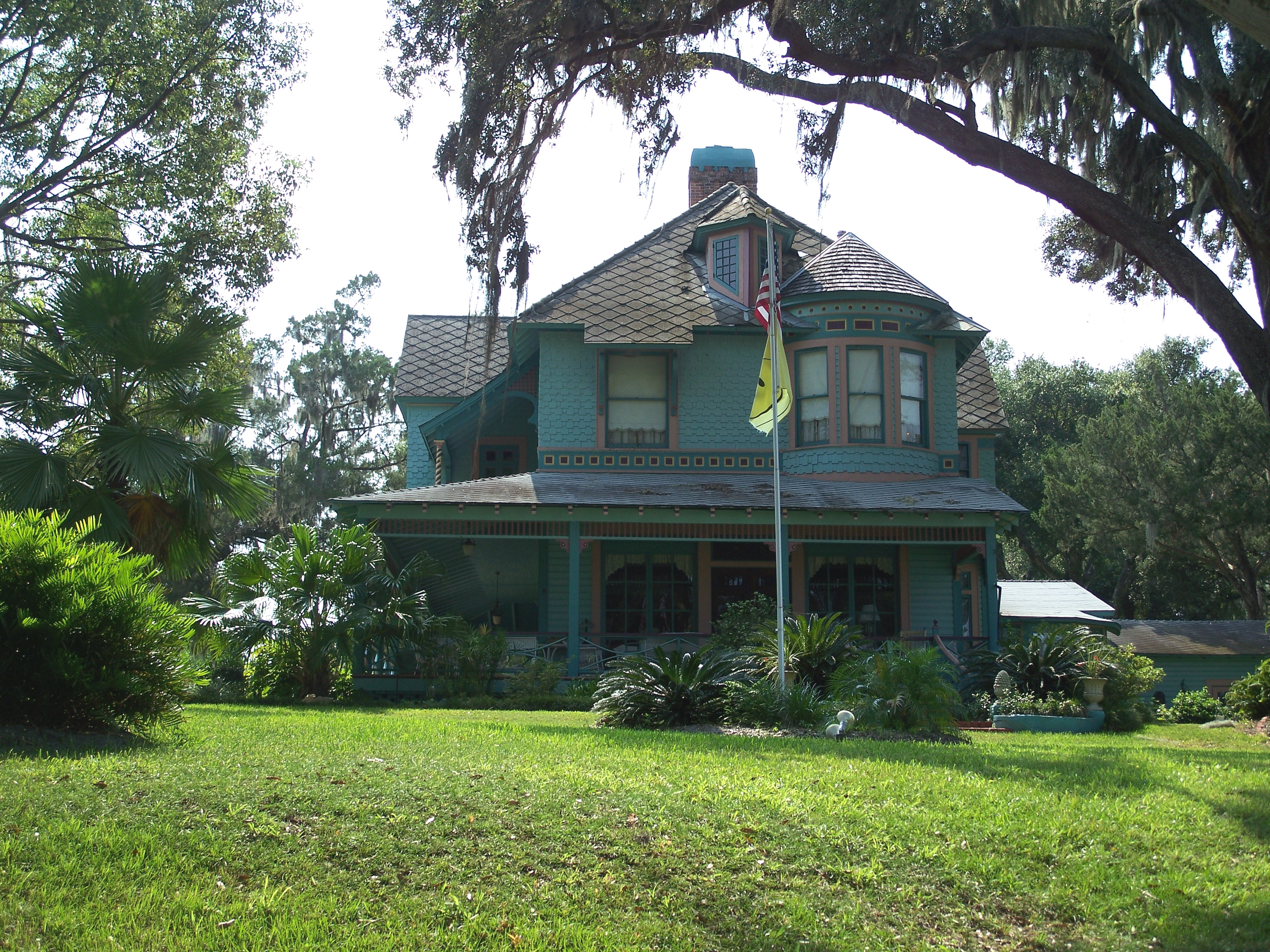
