= Interlachen Hall =

- U.S. National Register of Historic Places
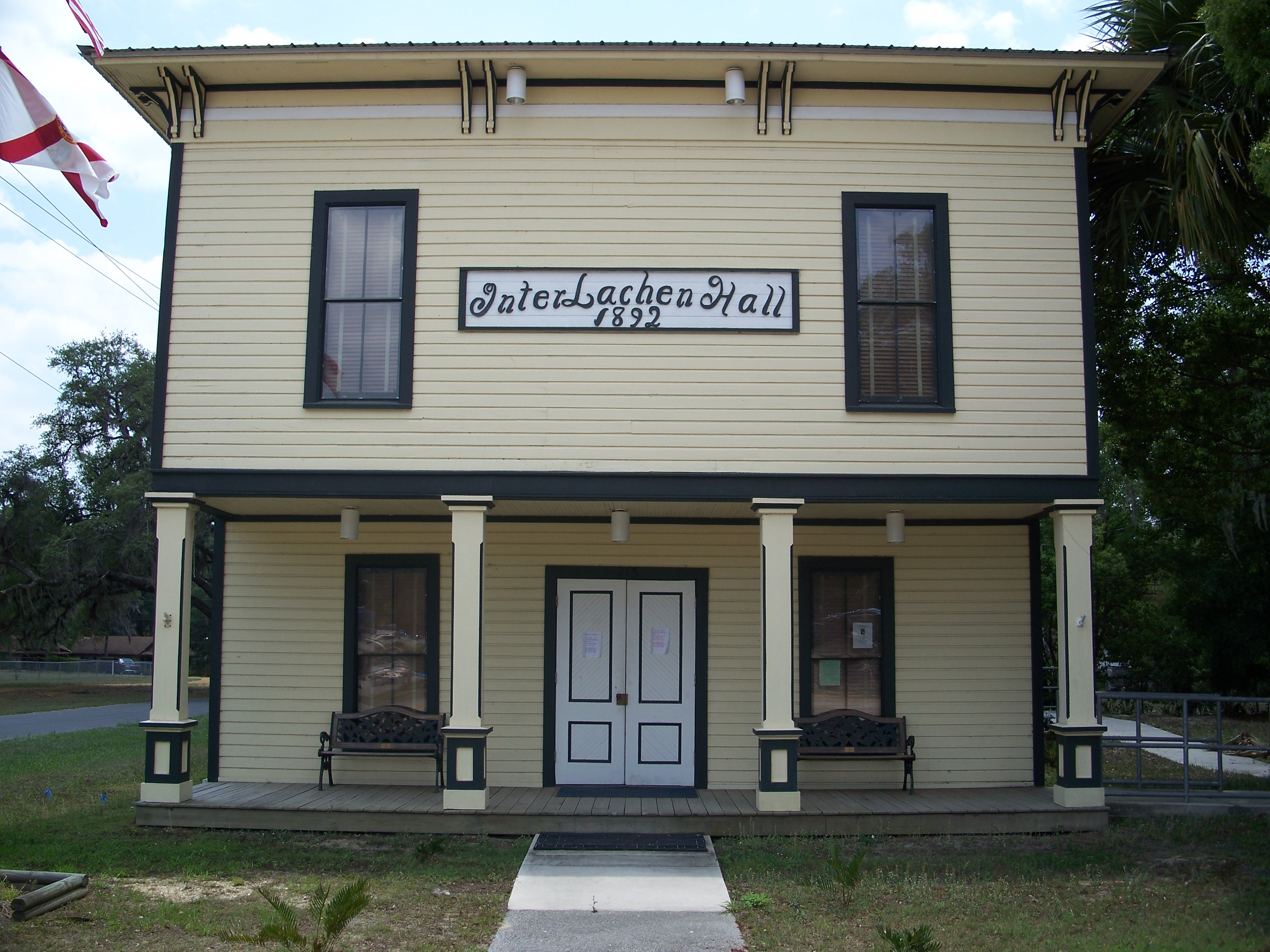

- Location within Florida Location within the United States
- Location: Interlachen, Florida
- Coordinates: 29°37′24″N 81°53′32″W
- Built: 1892
- Architectural style: Frame Vernacular with Italianate elements
- NRHP reference No.: 00000561
- Added to NRHP: June 2, 2000

The Interlachen Hall is a historic site in Interlachen, Florida, located at 215 Atlantic Avenue, on the southwest corner of Commonwealth Avenue. It has functioned as a meeting center for the town since its completion in 1892. On June 2, 2000, it was added to the U.S. National Register of Historic Places.
