= Tenney House and Groveland Hotel =

Historic buildings in Florida, United States

- U.S. National Register of Historic Places
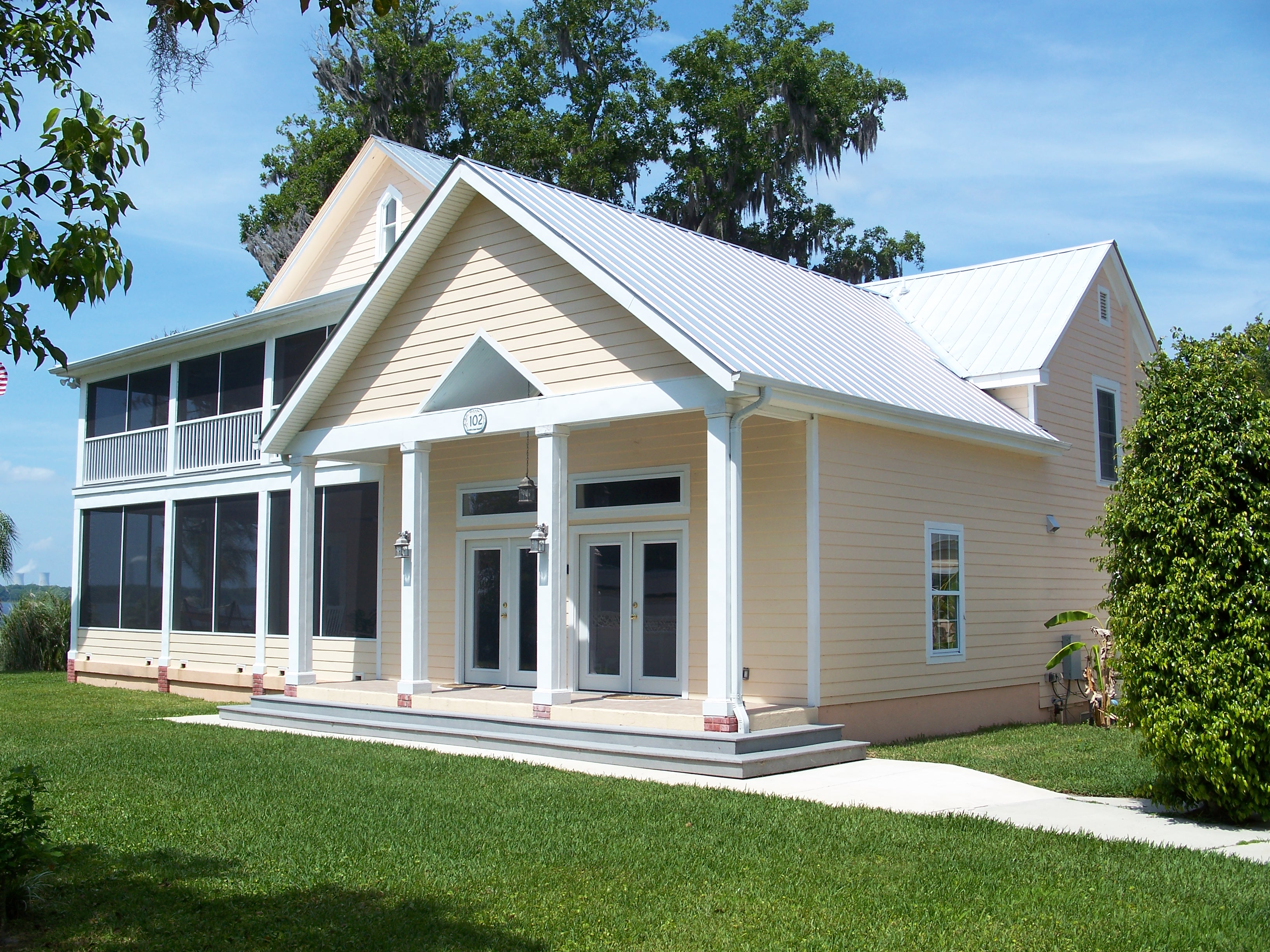
- Tenney House

- Location within Florida Location within the United States
- Location: Federal Point, Florida
- Coordinates: 29°44′48″N 81°32′50″W
- NRHP reference No.: 97001284
- Added to NRHP: October 30, 1997

The Tenney House and Groveland Hotel is a historic site in Federal Point, Florida. It is located at 100 and 102 Commercial Avenue. The Tenney House was a private residence and boarding house built in 1894 by John Tenney a vegetable farmer from New York who settled in the community in 1885. The Groveland Hotel was built in 1900. On October 30, 1997, it was added to the U.S. National Register of Historic Places.
