= Albert Carlton Estate =

Historic house in Florida, United States

- U.S. National Register of Historic Places
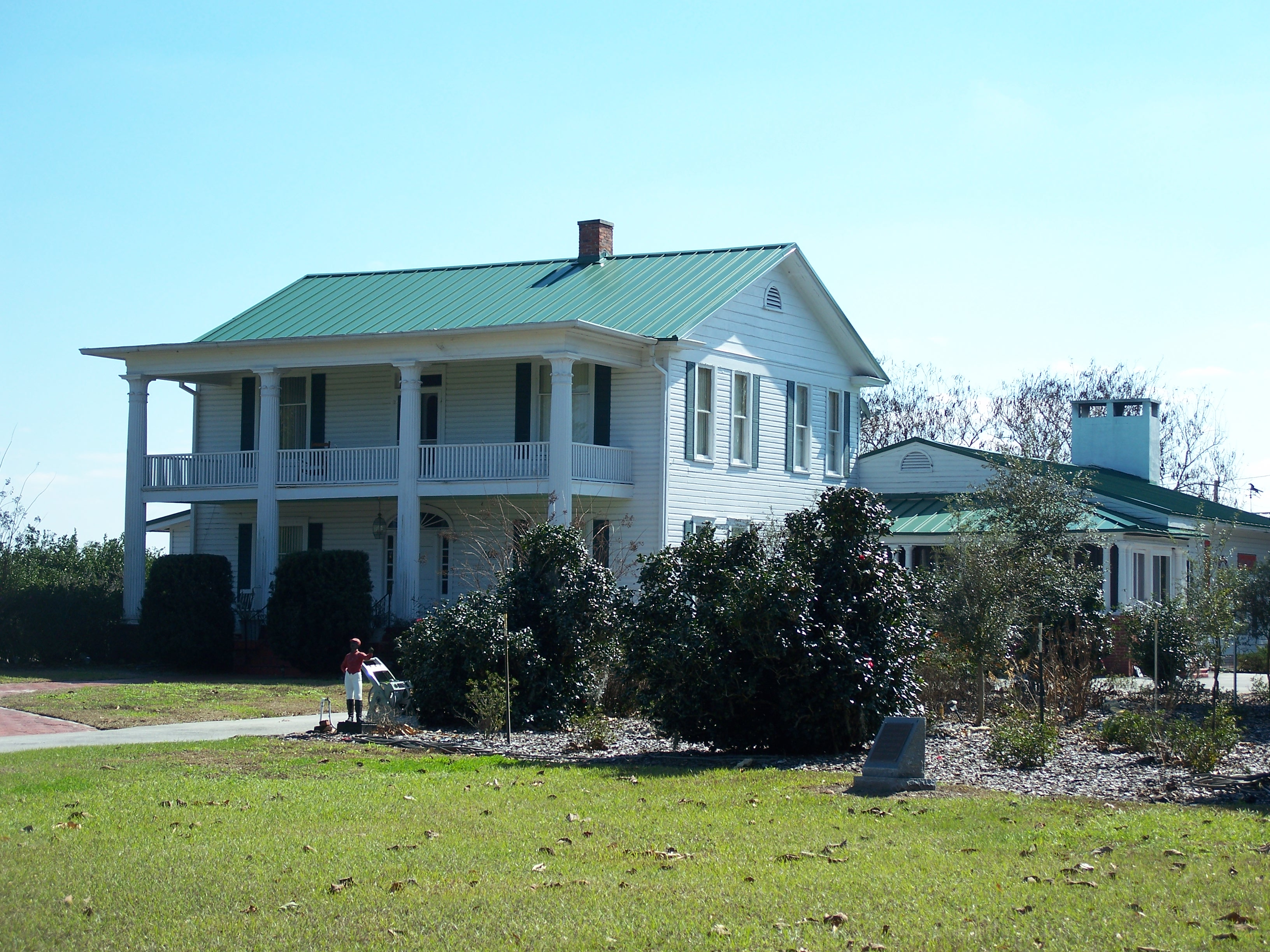

- Location within Florida Location within the United States
- Location: 302 E. Bay St., Wauchula, Florida
- Coordinates: 27°32′35″N 81°48′27″W
- Area: 31 acres (13 ha)
- Built: 1903
- Architectural style: Colonial Revival
- NRHP reference No.: 91000893
- Added to NRHP: October 3, 1991

The Albert Carlton Estate (also known as the Carlton-Underwood Estate and Azalea Hill) is a historic site in Wauchula, Florida, located at 302 East Bay Street. On October 3, 1991, it was added to the U.S. National Register of Historic Places.

The Carlton Estate was laid out as the main residence of Albert Carlton (1845-1925) and his wife, Martha McEwen Carlton, parents of ten children including Florida governor Doyle E. Carlton. After raising these children in an 1885 frame home with only three bedrooms, the family chose to relocate onto 31 acres in the town of Wauchula purchased from Albert's childless uncle and aunt, Eli and Priscilla (Carlton) English. The structure was built in 1903 by Carlton originally as a two and a half story Queen Anne style building. Covered in white clapboard, it featured two towers that rose above the wood shingled roof line and a veranda that wrapped around the north and west elevations. Martha lived in the house until her death in 1944, at which time it passed into the ownership of her son Alton Carlton.

In 1946, due to extensive hurricane damage and massive deterioration in the building's twin towers, the roofline was altered. The twin towers were removed and the main facade was adapted to the Colonial Revival style. Alton Carlton's wife Mary rooted the azalea bushes which gave the home the name "Azalea Hill," and at his death in 1967 their grandchild Tommy Underwood took possession of the home for a number of years, during which Mrs. Underwood depicted the house on a mural in the dining room. Three rooms were added to the house in 1987: a small one to the east facade and two others to the back. Otherwise, the main block and the interior of the 1903 building remain essentially intact.

The estate was nominated to the National Register of Historic Places as an example of a late 19th–early 20th century Colonial Revival style structure.
