= Crescent City Historic District =

Historic district in Florida, United States

- U.S. National Register of Historic Places
- U.S. Historic district
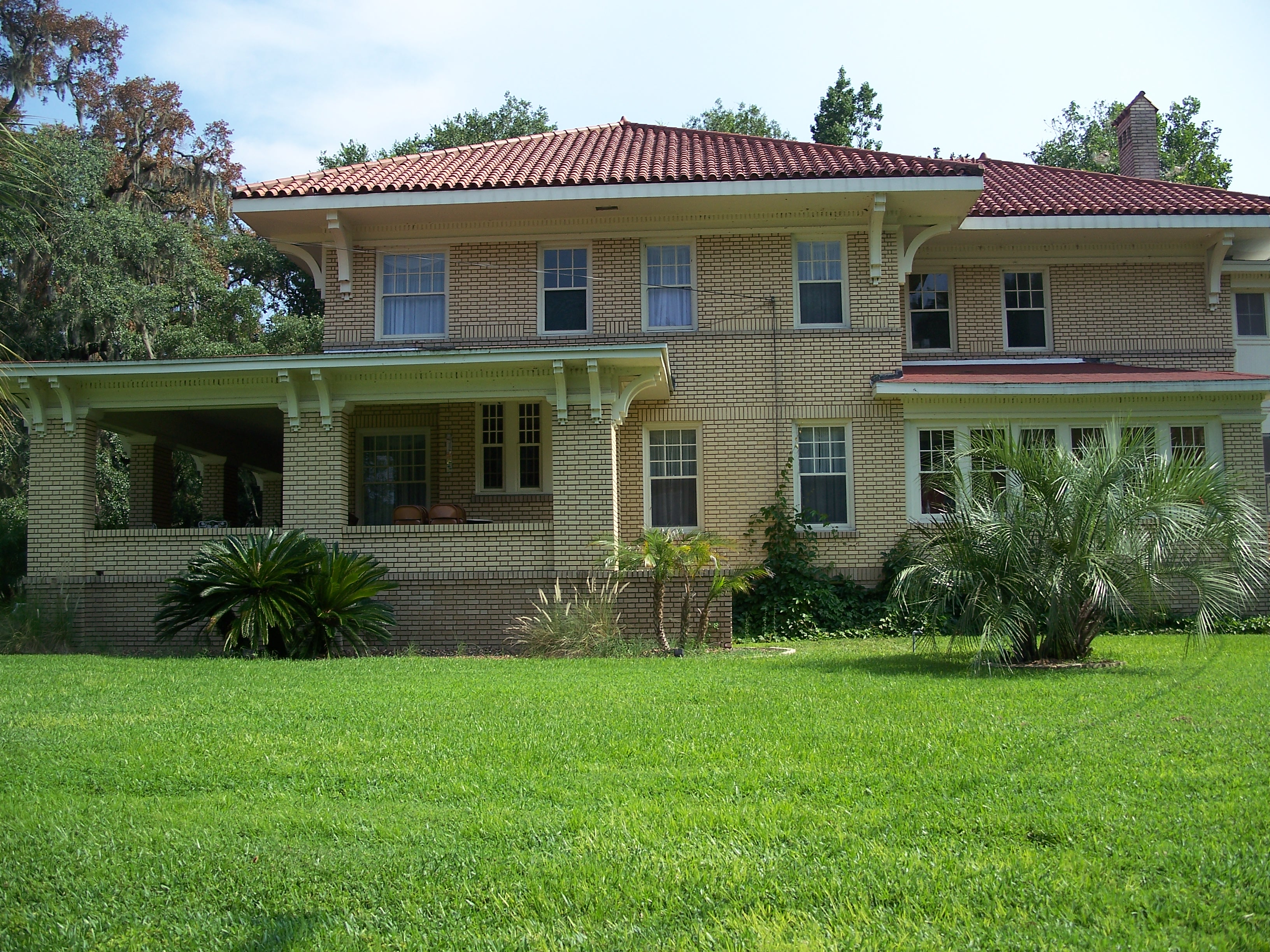
- House in the district

- Location within Florida Location within the United States
- Location: Roughly bounded by Lake Stella, Vernon Ave., Lake Crescent, and Orange Ave., Crescent City, Florida
- Coordinates: 29°25′49″N 81°30′36″W
- Area: 140 acres (0.57 km^{2})
- Architectural style: Colonial Revival, Italianate, Queen Anne
- NRHP reference No.: 96001367
- Added to NRHP: December 5, 1996

The Crescent City Historic District is a U.S. Historic District (designated as such on December 5, 1996) located in Crescent City, Florida. The district is bounded by Lake Stella, Vernon Avenue, Crescent Lake, and Orange Avenue. It contains 212 historic buildings.
