= Wauchula, Florida =

- City
- City of Wauchula
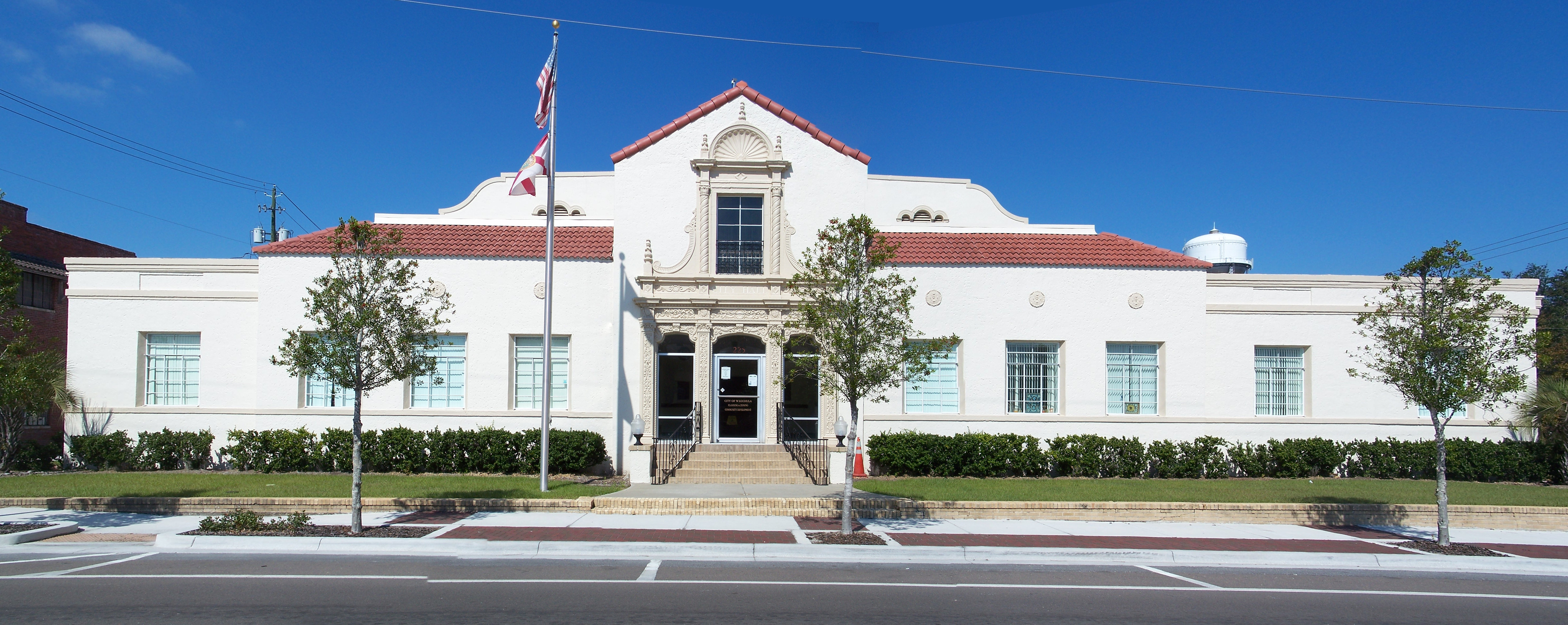
- Wauchula Chamber of Commerce in 2010

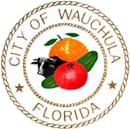
- Seal
- Mottoes: "Building New Beginnings From Old Traditions" "Cucumber Capital of the World"
- Location in Hardee County and the state of Florida
- Coordinates: 27°32′49″N 81°48′36″W
- Country: United States
- State: Florida
- County: Hardee
- Incorporated: September 29, 1902; 123 years ago

Government
  - Type: Commission–Manager

Area
  - Total: 3.27 sq mi (8.46 km^{2})
  - Land: 3.27 sq mi (8.46 km^{2})
  - Water: 0 sq mi (0.00 km^{2})
- Elevation: 108 ft (33 m)

Population (2020)
  - Total: 4,900
  - Density: 1,499.9/sq mi (579.13/km^{2})
- Time zone: UTC-5 (Eastern (EST))
  - Summer (DST): UTC-4 (EDT)
- ZIP code: 33873
- Area code: 863
- FIPS code: 12-75375
- GNIS feature ID: 2405690
- Website: www.cityofwauchula.gov

Wauchula is a city and the county seat of Hardee County, Florida, United States. As of the 2020 census, it had a population of 4,900. Wauchula has been called the "cucumber capital of the world", although citrus has become a more important agricultural crop over the past few decades. It is home to the downtown's Wauchula Historic District and Albert Carlton Estate.

== Geography ==
Wauchula is located in north-central Hardee County. U.S. Route 17 passes through the city, leading north 25 miles (40 km) to Bartow and south 24 miles (39 km) to Arcadia. Within the county, Zolfo Springs is 4 miles (6 km) to the south on US 17 and Bowling Green is 6 miles (10 km) to the north.

According to the United States Census Bureau, Wauchula has an area of 3.3 square miles (8.6 km^{2}), all land.

=== Hurricane Charley ===
Hurricane Charley hit Wauchula at c. 5:30 on Friday, August 13, 2004, causing more than $750 million in damage. Sustained winds of 140 mph (230 km/h), with gusts of over 160 mph (260 km/h), were clocked in downtown Wauchula. The entire area had either no running water, or contaminated water for one week. Power was lost to many sections for nearly three weeks, with school canceled for two weeks. The area was declared a federal disaster area after 85% of its buildings were either damaged or destroyed. There was a curfew set for the area for weeks after from 8 pm to 7 am.

=== Climate ===
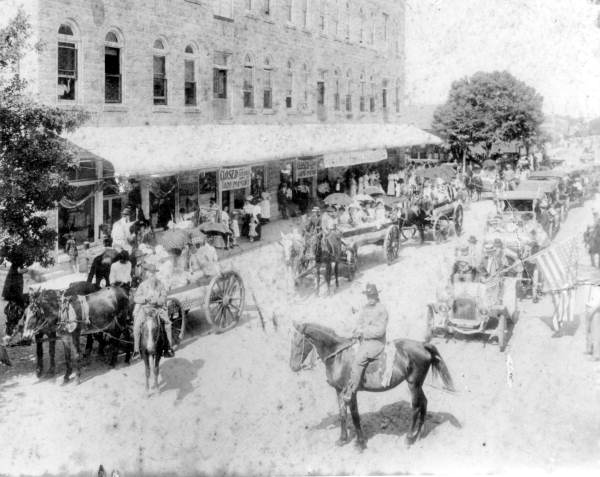
Confederate Memorial Day parade on Main Street, 1912

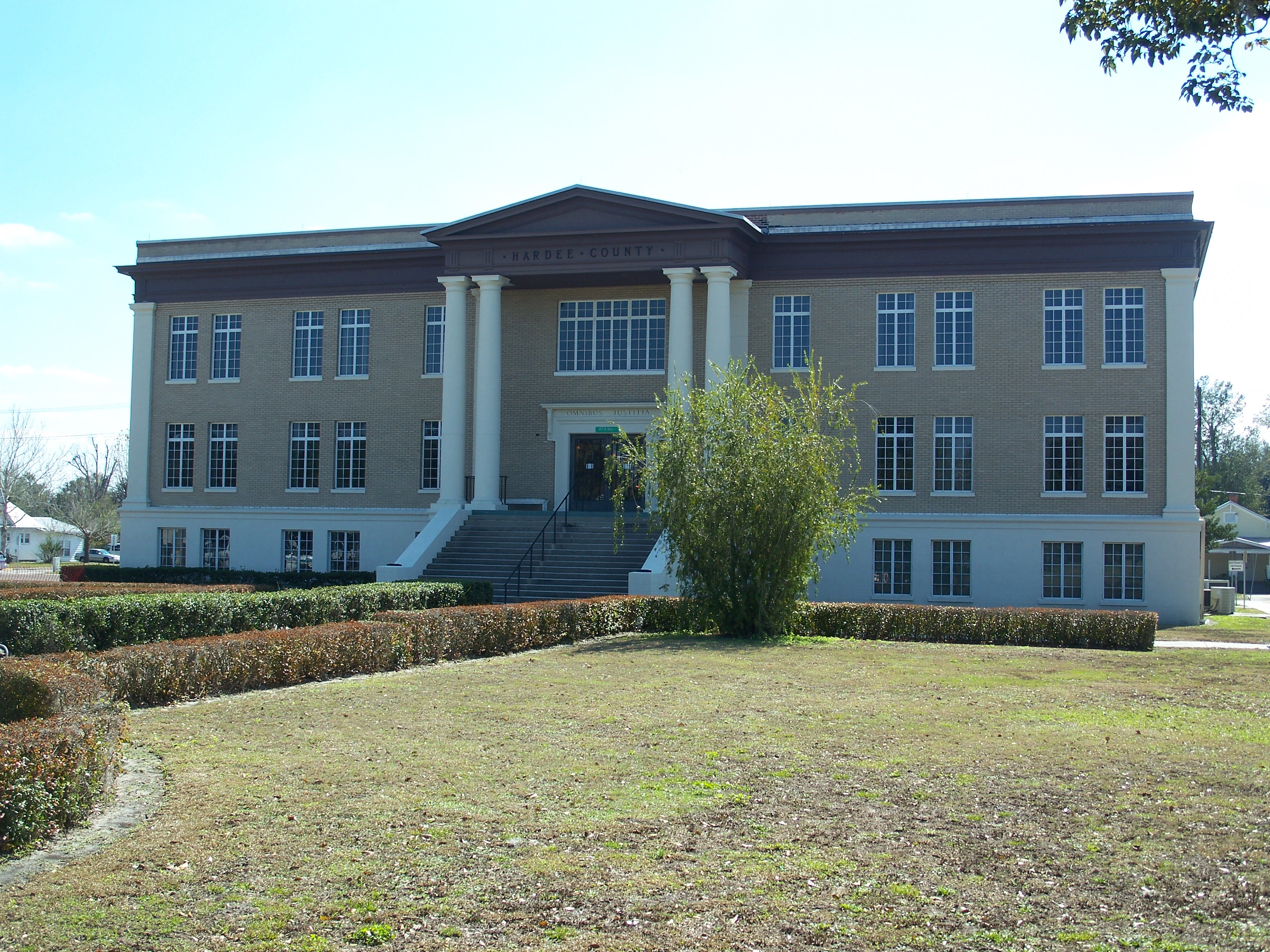
Hardee County Courthouse

The climate in this area is characterized by hot, humid summers and warm winters. According to the Köppen climate classification system, Wauchula has a humid subtropical climate zone (Cfa).

Climate data for Wauchula, Florida, 1991–2020 normals, extremes 1933–present
Month	Jan	Feb	Mar	Apr	May	Jun	Jul	Aug	Sep	Oct	Nov	Dec	Year
Record high °F (°C)	90 (32)	93 (34)	94 (34)	99 (37)	104 (40)	103 (39)	102 (39)	99 (37)	99 (37)	97 (36)	92 (33)	92 (33)	104 (40)
Mean maximum °F (°C)	83.9 (28.8)	86.0 (30.0)	87.1 (30.6)	91.2 (32.9)	94.2 (34.6)	95.8 (35.4)	95.6 (35.3)	95.7 (35.4)	94.3 (34.6)	91.5 (33.1)	87.2 (30.7)	84.6 (29.2)	96.9 (36.1)
Mean daily maximum °F (°C)	72.7 (22.6)	76.2 (24.6)	79.6 (26.4)	84.2 (29.0)	88.7 (31.5)	90.7 (32.6)	91.8 (33.2)	92.0 (33.3)	90.1 (32.3)	85.7 (29.8)	79.5 (26.4)	75.0 (23.9)	83.8 (28.8)
Daily mean °F (°C)	60.2 (15.7)	62.9 (17.2)	66.2 (19.0)	71.0 (21.7)	76.3 (24.6)	80.5 (26.9)	81.9 (27.7)	82.3 (27.9)	80.8 (27.1)	75.3 (24.1)	67.8 (19.9)	63.0 (17.2)	72.4 (22.4)
Mean daily minimum °F (°C)	47.7 (8.7)	49.6 (9.8)	52.9 (11.6)	57.7 (14.3)	63.9 (17.7)	70.3 (21.3)	72.1 (22.3)	72.7 (22.6)	71.5 (21.9)	64.9 (18.3)	56.0 (13.3)	51.0 (10.6)	60.9 (16.1)
Mean minimum °F (°C)	31.1 (−0.5)	34.0 (1.1)	37.9 (3.3)	45.2 (7.3)	54.4 (12.4)	65.2 (18.4)	68.6 (20.3)	69.1 (20.6)	66.1 (18.9)	50.2 (10.1)	41.4 (5.2)	34.8 (1.6)	29.5 (−1.4)
Record low °F (°C)	20 (−7)	20 (−7)	23 (−5)	34 (1)	40 (4)	51 (11)	61 (16)	61 (16)	55 (13)	37 (3)	24 (−4)	21 (−6)	20 (−7)
Average precipitation inches (mm)	2.29 (58)	2.18 (55)	2.99 (76)	2.92 (74)	3.51 (89)	8.46 (215)	7.69 (195)	8.46 (215)	6.32 (161)	3.09 (78)	1.96 (50)	2.13 (54)	52.00 (1,321)
Average precipitation days (≥ 0.01 in)	4.9	4.1	4.2	4.3	5.8	13.4	13.1	13.9	11.3	5.8	3.9	4.5	89.2
Source: NOAA

== Demographics ==
Historical population
Census	Pop.	Note	%±
1910	1,099		—
1920	2,081		89.4%
1930	2,574		23.7%
1940	2,710		5.3%
1950	2,872		6.0%
1960	3,411		18.8%
1970	3,007		−11.8%
1980	3,296		9.6%
1990	3,253		−1.3%
2000	4,368		34.3%
2010	5,001		14.5%
2020	4,900		−2.0%
U.S. Decennial Census

=== Racial and ethnic composition ===
Wauchula racial composition (Hispanics excluded from racial categories) (NH = Non-Hispanic)
Race	Pop 2010	Pop 2020	% 2010	% 2020
White (NH)	2,179	2,008	43.57%	40.98%
Black or African American (NH)	281	358	5.62%	7.31%
Native American or Alaska Native (NH)	17	4	0.34%	0.08%
Asian (NH)	49	41	0.98%	0.84%
Pacific Islander or Native Hawaiian (NH)	1	2	0.02%	0.04%
Some other race (NH)	4	5	0.08%	0.10%
Two or more races/Multiracial (NH)	42	97	0.84%	1.98%
Hispanic or Latino (any race)	2,428	2,385	48.55%	48.67%
Total	5,001	4,900	100.00%	100.00%

=== 2020 census ===
As of the 2020 census, Wauchula had a population of 4,900. The median age was 31.5 years. 31.8% of residents were under the age of 18 and 13.8% of residents were 65 years of age or older. For every 100 females there were 94.1 males, and for every 100 females age 18 and over there were 89.5 males age 18 and over.

99.6% of residents lived in urban areas, while 0.4% lived in rural areas.

There were 1,604 households in Wauchula, of which 43.3% had children under the age of 18 living in them. Of all households, 41.6% were married-couple households, 20.0% were households with a male householder and no spouse or partner present, and 31.3% were households with a female householder and no spouse or partner present. About 24.0% of all households were made up of individuals and 11.6% had someone living alone who was 65 years of age or older.

There were 1,807 housing units, of which 11.2% were vacant. The homeowner vacancy rate was 1.2% and the rental vacancy rate was 8.8%.

=== Demographic estimates ===
According to the American Community Survey 5-year estimates, there were 1,072 families residing in the city in 2020.

According to the American Community Survey 5-year estimates, there were 5,001 people, 1,574 households, and 1,035 families residing in the city in 2010.

=== 2000 census ===
As of the census of 2000, there were 4,368 people, 1,431 households, and 985 families residing in the city. The population density was 1,669.6 inhabitants per square mile (644.6/km^{2}). There were 1,562 housing units at an average density of 597.0 per square mile (230.5/km^{2}). The racial makeup of the city was 73.44% White, 4.17% African American, 0.57% Native American, 0.30% Asian, 18.84% from other races, and 2.68% from two or more races. Hispanic or Latino of any race were 39.42% of the population.

In 2000, there were 1,431 households, out of which 36.5% had children under the age of 18 living with them, 48.9% were married couples living together, 14.8% had a female householder with no husband present, and 31.1% were non-families. 26.5% of all households were made up of individuals, and 13.1% had someone living alone who was 65 years of age or older. The average household size was 2.97 and the average family size was 3.57.

In 2000, in the city, the population was spread out, with 30.7% under the age of 18, 11.6% from 18 to 24, 26.9% from 25 to 44, 17.1% from 45 to 64, and 13.7% who were 65 years of age or older. The median age was 30 years. For every 100 females, there were 98.5 males. For every 100 females age 18 and over, there were 96.7 males.

In 2000, the median income for a household in the city was $25,931, and the median income for a family was $29,943. Males had a median income of $19,129 versus $15,867 for females. The per capita income for the city was $10,665. About 19.9% of families and 25.0% of the population were below the poverty line, including 30.0% of those under age 18 and 12.8% of those age 65 or over.

== Infrastructure ==
Wauchula Municipal Airport is a public-use airport located 5 miles (8.0 km) southwest of the central business district.

Center for Great Apes is a permanent sanctuary for rescued orangutans and chimpanzees.

The only hospital in Wauchula is AdventHealth Wauchula.

== Notable people ==
- Doyle E. Carlton (1885–1972), 25th governor of Florida
- Tom McEwen (1923–2011), sportswriter
- B. J. McLeod (born 1983), NASCAR driver
- Zeke Mowatt (born 1961), NFL football player and Super Bowl XXI champion

== See also ==
- Hardee High School
- List of municipalities in Florida
- National Register of Historic Places listings in Hardee County, Florida
