= Campbell Township, Wilkin County, Minnesota =

Campbell Township, Minnesota
- Township
- Location of Campbell Township, within Wilkin County, Minnesota

- Location within the state of Minnesota Campbell Township, Minnesota (the United States)
- Coordinates: 46°4′22″N 96°27′45″W
- Country: United States
- State: Minnesota
- County: Wilkin

Area
  - Total: 50.0 sq mi (129.6 km^{2})
  - Land: 50.0 sq mi (129.6 km^{2})
  - Water: 0 sq mi (0.0 km^{2})
- Elevation: 980 ft (300 m)

Population (2020)
  - Total: 68
  - Density: 1.4/sq mi (0.52/km^{2})
- Time zone: UTC-6 (Central (CST))
  - Summer (DST): UTC-5 (CDT)
- ZIP code: 56522
- Area code: 218
- FIPS code: 27-09514
- GNIS feature ID: 0663735

Campbell Township is a township in Wilkin County, Minnesota, United States. The population was 68 at the 2020 census.

Campbell Township was organized in 1879.

== Geography ==
According to the United States Census Bureau, the township has a total area of 50.0 square miles (129 km^{2}), all land.

== Demographics ==
As of the census of 2000, there were 99 people, 35 households, and 29 families residing in the township. The population density was 2.0 inhabitants per square mile (0.77/km^{2}). There were 38 housing units at an average density of 0.8 per square mile (0.31/km^{2}). The racial makeup of the township was 97.98% White, and 2.02% from two or more races.

There were 35 households, out of which 34.3% had children under the age of 18 living with them, 71.4% were married couples living together, 8.6% had a female householder with no husband present, and 14.3% were non-families. 14.3% of all households were made up of individuals, and 5.7% had someone living alone who was 65 years of age or older. The average household size was 2.83 and the average family size was 3.10.

In the township the population was spread out, with 27.3% under the age of 18, 4.0% from 18 to 24, 28.3% from 25 to 44, 23.2% from 45 to 64, and 17.2% who were 65 years of age or older. The median age was 40 years. For every 100 females, there were 86.8 males. For every 100 females age 18 and over, there were 94.6 males.

The median income for a household in the township was $54,063, and the median income for a family was $57,500. Males had a median income of $29,643 versus $16,875 for females. The per capita income for the township was $22,936. None of the population and none of the families were below the poverty line.
