= Federal Point, Florida =

- Interactive map of Federal Point, Florida
- County: Putnam County
- Elevation: 0.91 m (3 ft)
- Time zone: UTC-5 (EST)
  - Summer (DST): UTC-4 (EDT)
- GNIS ID: 282404

Federal Point is an unincorporated community in Putnam County, Florida, United States, located northwest of Hastings, on the eastern bank of the St. Johns River.

== Geography ==
Federal Point is located at 29°44′52″N 81°32′40″W. It is the northernmost community in Putnam County on the east side of the St. Johns River. Besides being located northwest of Hastings, it is also located north of East Palatka and south of the Deep Creek Conservation Area in St. Johns County.

=== Climate ===
Climate data for Federal Point, Florida, 1991–2020 normals, extremes 1892–2019
Month	Jan	Feb	Mar	Apr	May	Jun	Jul	Aug	Sep	Oct	Nov	Dec	Year
Record high °F (°C)	87 (31)	90 (32)	95 (35)	95 (35)	103 (39)	106 (41)	104 (40)	107 (42)	100 (38)	98 (37)	90 (32)	85 (29)	107 (42)
Mean maximum °F (°C)	77.8 (25.4)	80.3 (26.8)	84.9 (29.4)	89.3 (31.8)	94.3 (34.6)	97.1 (36.2)	96.8 (36.0)	95.8 (35.4)	92.7 (33.7)	89.2 (31.8)	83.4 (28.6)	78.9 (26.1)	98.4 (36.9)
Mean daily maximum °F (°C)	64.5 (18.1)	68.2 (20.1)	73.8 (23.2)	79.6 (26.4)	85.3 (29.6)	88.3 (31.3)	90.0 (32.2)	89.1 (31.7)	85.6 (29.8)	80.0 (26.7)	72.7 (22.6)	67.0 (19.4)	78.7 (25.9)
Daily mean °F (°C)	55.8 (13.2)	59.1 (15.1)	63.8 (17.7)	69.5 (20.8)	75.3 (24.1)	79.6 (26.4)	81.4 (27.4)	81.1 (27.3)	78.5 (25.8)	72.5 (22.5)	64.6 (18.1)	58.7 (14.8)	70.0 (21.1)
Mean daily minimum °F (°C)	47.1 (8.4)	49.9 (9.9)	53.7 (12.1)	59.3 (15.2)	65.3 (18.5)	70.8 (21.6)	72.8 (22.7)	73.0 (22.8)	71.4 (21.9)	65.0 (18.3)	56.6 (13.7)	50.5 (10.3)	61.3 (16.3)
Mean minimum °F (°C)	29.5 (−1.4)	33.6 (0.9)	38.8 (3.8)	44.7 (7.1)	55.2 (12.9)	64.7 (18.2)	67.7 (19.8)	68.6 (20.3)	63.8 (17.7)	50.6 (10.3)	40.2 (4.6)	32.3 (0.2)	26.7 (−2.9)
Record low °F (°C)	11 (−12)	13 (−11)	24 (−4)	36 (2)	42 (6)	53 (12)	61 (16)	60 (16)	55 (13)	37 (3)	25 (−4)	16 (−9)	11 (−12)
Average precipitation inches (mm)	2.85 (72)	2.58 (66)	3.10 (79)	2.50 (64)	3.47 (88)	7.77 (197)	6.36 (162)	6.72 (171)	7.31 (186)	4.54 (115)	1.98 (50)	2.22 (56)	51.40 (1,306)
Average precipitation days (≥ 0.01 in)	8.8	7.9	7.7	6.3	7.6	15.5	16.4	17.8	15.1	9.6	7.5	7.5	127.7
Source: NOAA (mean maxima/minima 1981–2010)
