= Crescent City, Florida =

- City
- City of Crescent City
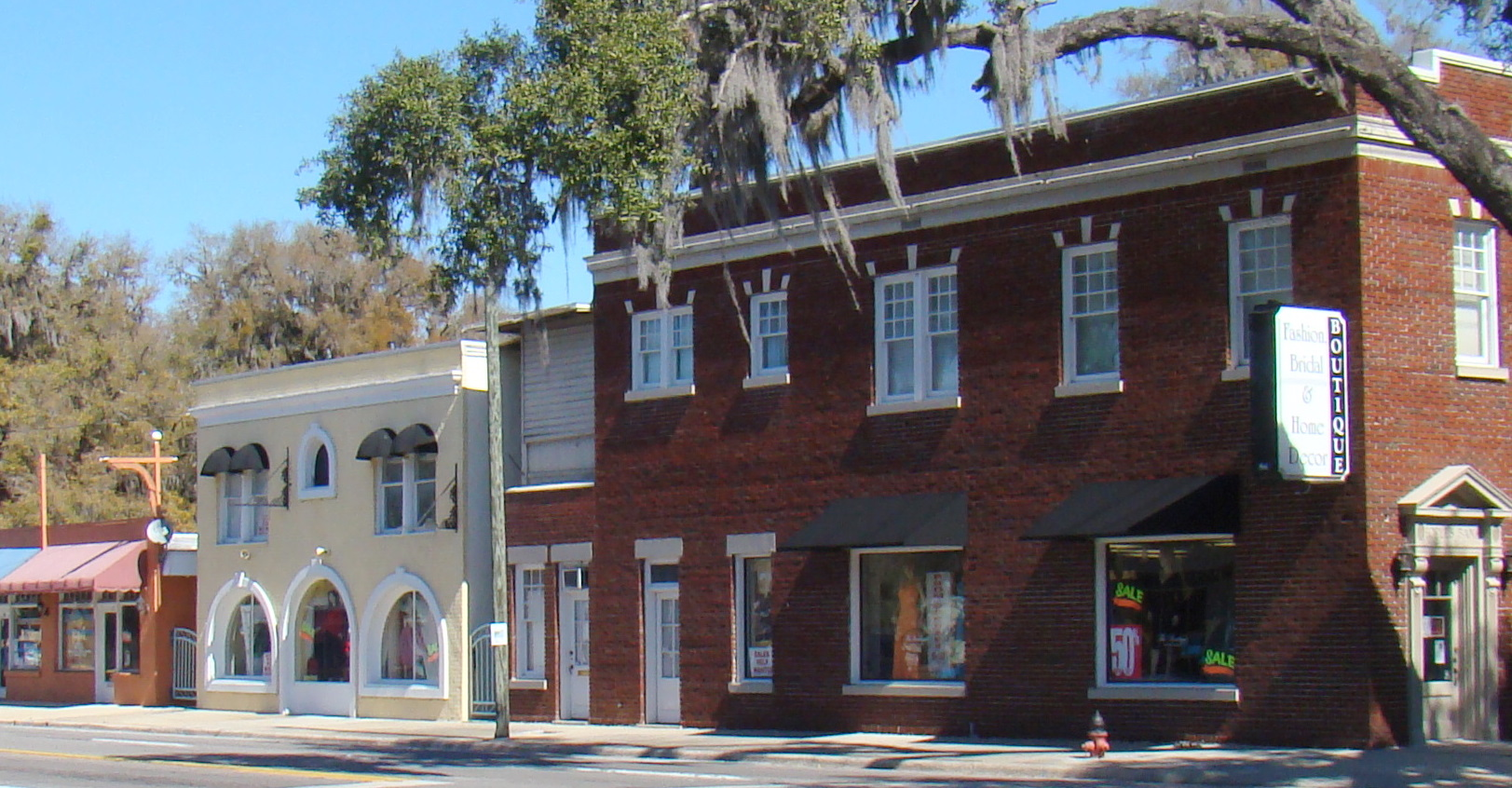
- North Summit Street at Central Avenue

- Seal
- Motto: "Life Between the Lakes"
- Location in Putnam County and the state of Florida
- Coordinates: 29°26′15″N 81°31′02″W
- Country: United States
- State: Florida
- County: Putnam
- Settled (Old Oliver Plantation): 1852
- Platted (Crescent City): 1876
- Incorporated (City of Crescent City): 1883
- Formally Incorporated (City of Crescent City): 1885

Government
  - Type: Commission–Manager
  - Mayor: Michele Myers
  - Vice Mayor: William "B.J." Laurie
  - Commissioners: Lisa Kane DeVitto, Cynthia Burton, and Linda Moore
  - City Manager: Derek A. Martin
  - City Clerk: Melanie Ames

Area
  - Total: 2.39 sq mi (6.18 km^{2})
  - Land: 2.07 sq mi (5.35 km^{2})
  - Water: 0.32 sq mi (0.83 km^{2}) 14.02%
- Elevation: 39 ft (12 m)

Population (2020)
  - Total: 1,654
  - Density: 801.2/sq mi (309.33/km^{2})
- Time zone: UTC-5 (Eastern (EST))
  - Summer (DST): UTC-4 (EDT)
- ZIP code: 32112
- Area code: 386
- FIPS code: 12-15375
- GNIS feature ID: 2404150
- Website: www.crescentcity-fl.com

Crescent City is a city in Putnam County, Florida, United States. As of the 2020 Census, its population was 1,654, up from 1,577 at the 2010 census. The city is located on two lakes and is part of the Palatka, Florida Micropolitan Statistical Area.

== History ==
Crescent City was first settled by non-indigenous people in 1852, and was then known as the "Old Oliver Plantation" until it was platted as "Crescent City" in 1876.

The City of Crescent City was officially incorporated as a municipality in 1883, and formally incorporated as a city two years later, in 1885.

A. Philip Randolph, the founder of the Brotherhood of Sleeping Car Porters, was born in Crescent City in 1889. Randolph would become a prominent civil rights leader, especially during the Civil Rights Movement in the 1950s and 1960s. Randolph Street in Crescent City is named after this influential figure.

Crescent City has two listings on the National Register of Historic Places, Hubbard House and the Crescent City Historic District.

Eagle's Nest Grove in Crescent City is the oldest continuous organic citrus grove in Florida.

== Geography ==
The city is located between two lakes, Crescent Lake lies to the east of the city, and Stella Lake is located to the west.

According to the United States Census Bureau, the city has a total area of 2.1 square miles (5.4 km^{2}), of which 1.8 square miles (4.7 km^{2}) is land and 0.3 square miles (0.78 km^{2}) (14.02%) is water.

=== Climate ===
The climate in this area is characterized by hot, humid summers and generally mild winters. According to the Köppen climate classification, the City of Crescent City has a humid subtropical climate zone (Cfa).

Climate data for Crescent City, Florida, 1991–2020 normals, extremes 1912–2020
Month	Jan	Feb	Mar	Apr	May	Jun	Jul	Aug	Sep	Oct	Nov	Dec	Year
Record high °F (°C)	86 (30)	90 (32)	92 (33)	97 (36)	103 (39)	108 (42)	106 (41)	105 (41)	103 (39)	97 (36)	91 (33)	85 (29)	108 (42)
Mean maximum °F (°C)	80.6 (27.0)	82.8 (28.2)	85.8 (29.9)	89.3 (31.8)	93.3 (34.1)	96.0 (35.6)	96.7 (35.9)	96.5 (35.8)	93.8 (34.3)	89.3 (31.8)	85.3 (29.6)	80.8 (27.1)	98.2 (36.8)
Mean daily maximum °F (°C)	67.6 (19.8)	70.7 (21.5)	75.2 (24.0)	80.7 (27.1)	85.8 (29.9)	89.2 (31.8)	90.6 (32.6)	90.6 (32.6)	87.9 (31.1)	82.0 (27.8)	74.8 (23.8)	69.5 (20.8)	80.4 (26.9)
Daily mean °F (°C)	57.5 (14.2)	60.4 (15.8)	64.9 (18.3)	70.5 (21.4)	76.3 (24.6)	80.7 (27.1)	82.3 (27.9)	82.5 (28.1)	80.2 (26.8)	73.8 (23.2)	65.8 (18.8)	60.2 (15.7)	71.3 (21.8)
Mean daily minimum °F (°C)	47.3 (8.5)	50.2 (10.1)	54.5 (12.5)	60.4 (15.8)	66.7 (19.3)	72.1 (22.3)	74.0 (23.3)	74.4 (23.6)	72.5 (22.5)	65.6 (18.7)	56.8 (13.8)	51.0 (10.6)	62.1 (16.7)
Mean minimum °F (°C)	31.3 (−0.4)	34.9 (1.6)	39.9 (4.4)	48.3 (9.1)	57.3 (14.1)	67.0 (19.4)	70.1 (21.2)	71.0 (21.7)	66.7 (19.3)	51.4 (10.8)	41.4 (5.2)	36.0 (2.2)	29.2 (−1.6)
Record low °F (°C)	15 (−9)	19 (−7)	28 (−2)	30 (−1)	46 (8)	56 (13)	58 (14)	65 (18)	56 (13)	39 (4)	25 (−4)	14 (−10)	14 (−10)
Average precipitation inches (mm)	2.82 (72)	2.69 (68)	2.80 (71)	2.36 (60)	4.04 (103)	7.57 (192)	6.82 (173)	7.14 (181)	5.92 (150)	3.47 (88)	2.06 (52)	2.21 (56)	49.90 (1,267)
Average precipitation days (≥ 0.01 in)	7.0	6.3	6.0	4.9	6.9	13.4	14.2	14.4	11.5	7.6	5.6	6.5	104.3
Source: NOAA

== Demographics ==
Historical population
Census	Pop.	Note	%±
1890	554		—
1900	352		−36.5%
1910	677		92.3%
1920	838		23.8%
1930	955		14.0%
1940	1,124		17.7%
1950	1,393		23.9%
1960	1,629		16.9%
1970	1,734		6.4%
1980	1,722		−0.7%
1990	1,859		8.0%
2000	1,776		−4.5%
2010	1,577		−11.2%
2020	1,654		4.9%
U.S. Decennial Census

=== Racial and ethnic composition ===
Crescent City racial composition (Hispanics excluded from racial categories) (NH = Non-Hispanic)
Race	Pop 2010	Pop 2020	% 2010	% 2020
White (NH)	768	764	48.70%	46.19%
Black or African American (NH)	481	467	30.50%	28.23%
Native American or Alaska Native (NH)	5	2	0.32%	0.12%
Asian (NH)	6	15	0.38%	0.91%
Pacific Islander or Native Hawaiian (NH)	11	0	0.70%	0.00%
Some other race (NH)	1	6	0.06%	0.36%
Two or more races/Multiracial (NH)	26	56	1.65%	3.39%
Hispanic or Latino (any race)	279	344	17.69%	20.80%
Total	1,577	1,654	100.00%	100.00%

=== 2020 census ===
As of the 2020 census, Crescent City had a population of 1,654. The median age was 45.0 years. 21.8% of residents were under the age of 18 and 26.4% of residents were 65 years of age or older. For every 100 females there were 88.2 males, and for every 100 females age 18 and over there were 85.8 males age 18 and over.

0.0% of residents lived in urban areas, while 100.0% lived in rural areas.

There were 669 households in Crescent City, of which 29.4% had children under the age of 18 living in them. Of all households, 32.3% were married-couple households, 22.6% were households with a male householder and no spouse or partner present, and 38.0% were households with a female householder and no spouse or partner present. About 36.2% of all households were made up of individuals and 19.9% had someone living alone who was 65 years of age or older.

There were 824 housing units, of which 18.8% were vacant. The homeowner vacancy rate was 2.5% and the rental vacancy rate was 11.3%.

According to the 2020 American Community Survey 5-year estimates, there were 372 families residing in the city.

=== 2010 census ===
As of the 2010 United States census, there were 1,577 people, 751 households, and 463 families residing in the city.

=== 2000 census ===
As of the census of 2000, there were 1,776 people, 678 households, and 435 families residing in the city. The population density was 968.6 inhabitants per square mile (374.0/km^{2}). There were 846 housing units at an average density of 461.4 per square mile (178.1/km^{2}). The racial makeup of the city was 57.32% White, 34.46% African American, 0.39% Native American, 0.73% Asian, 5.74% from other races, and 1.35% from two or more races. Hispanic or Latino of any race were 14.53% of the population.

In 2000, there were 678 households, out of which 27.7% had children under the age of 18 living with them, 40.4% were married couples living together, 18.7% had a female householder with no husband present, and 35.8% were non-families. 31.1% of all households were made up of individuals, and 16.7% had someone living alone who was 65 years of age or older. The average household size was 2.49 and the average family size was 3.12.

In 2000, in the city, the population was spread out, with 27.4% under the age of 18, 7.4% from 18 to 24, 21.6% from 25 to 44, 20.9% from 45 to 64, and 22.7% who were 65 years of age or older. The median age was 40 years. For every 100 females, there were 86.4 males. For every 100 females age 18 and over, there were 81.8 males.

In 2000, the median income for a household in the city was $22,500, and the median income for a family was $28,913. Males had a median income of $26,786 versus $15,887 for females. The per capita income for the city was $12,767. About 24.5% of families and 27.9% of the population were below the poverty line, including 35.2% of those under age 18 and 15.3% of those age 65 or over.

== Government ==
Crescent City is governed by a five-member city commission including the mayor/commissioner who presides at meetings. The city is a council-manager government and employs a full-time city manager to handle day-to-day operations.

As of April 2026, the mayor is Michele Myers, the vice mayor is William "B.J." Laurie, and the commission members are Cynthia Burton, Lisa Kane DeVitto, and Linda Moore.

And as of April 2026, the city manager is Derek Martin, and the city clerk is Melanie Ames.

== Education ==
All public schools in Crescent City are operated under the Putnam County School District.

The public schools within the city limits is Middleton-Burney Elementary School (K-6). Crescent City High School is for students in seventh through twelfth grades but is located several miles north of the city limits.

=== Library ===
Crescent City Library is served by the Putnam County Library System.

== Notable person ==
- A. Philip Randolph, civil rights leader and founder of the Brotherhood of Sleeping Car Porters
