= Crescent City High School =

Coordinates: 29.4727503°N 81.5353525°W

Crescent City Jr.-Sr. High School
- Crescent City, Putnam, Florida; United States

Information
- Type: Public
- Motto: Soar To Success!
- School district: Putnam County School District (Florida)
- Principal: Tim Adams
- Teaching staff: 49.00 (FTE)
- Enrollment: 994 (2023-2024)
- Student to teacher ratio: 20.29
- Colors: Gold, maroon and white
- Athletics: 12 interscholastic sports
- Mascot: Raiders
- Website: https://www.putnamschools.org/o/cchs

Crescent City Junior-Senior High School is a high school in Crescent City, Florida, United States for 7th to 12th graders. Its sports teams are known as "The Raiders". The school is operated by Putnam County School District (Florida). There are approximately 1000 students attending currently. Current courses include Health Sciences, Chorus and Band, Teacher Assisting, Welding, Construction Tech and ROTC. CCJSHS is currently a "B" school, with plans of becoming an "A" school.
