= List of American universities with Olympic medalist students and alumni =

The list of American universities with Olympic medalist students and alumni shows the number of Olympic medals won by students and alumni of American universities in the Olympic Games up through 2020 Tokyo Summer Olympics. Many of these athletes did not compete for the United States; the American college sports model, in which post-secondary institutions sponsor a wide range of athletic competitions and provide scholarships and subsidies to athletes with no regard for their origin, has the effect of drawing university-age athletes from all over the world to the United States for both academic and athletic study.

This list considers both summer and winter Olympic games, and only those who actually received Olympic medals are counted. Therefore, the list includes Olympic athletes only and excludes coaches, staff managers and so on. In addition, if an athlete attended more than one university, that athlete might show up in the medal count of each university attended. For example, Alma Richards who won the gold medal in the 1912 Stockholm Olympics in the high jump attended BYU prep school (degree), Cornell University (degree), the University of Southern California (degree) and Stanford University. He is listed in the medal count for BYU, Cornell and the University of Southern California, but Stanford does not include him in its list. Finally, in this list, universities are presented in descending order starting from those with the most Olympic medals.

In the 2020 Tokyo Summer Olympics, the university with the most Olympic medals in the U.S. was University of Southern California (31 medals) , followed by Stanford University (26 medals), the University of Florida (17 medals), UCLA (16 medals) and UC Berkeley (16 medals).

Although the 2024 Summer Olympics results have been announced, some have not yet been added to the tables below.

== Top 10 ==
Rank	University	State	NCAA	1st place, gold medalist(s)	2nd place, silver medalist(s)	3rd place, bronze medalist(s)	Total	Tokyo 2020	Beijing 2022	References
1	University of Southern California	California	Div I	163	96	77	336	31		
2	Stanford University	California	Div I	151	81	68	300 (Note: Stanford's count (296=150+79+67) may have overlooked or excluded some medals from the past Summer/Winter Olympics. For fair comparison, some of these medals have been manually added to Stanford's count in this list (with supporting sources): Alma Richards (1 gold), Debi Thomas (1 bronze), Sami Jo Small (2 golds, 1 silver), and John Coyle (1 silver).)	26		
3	University of California, Los Angeles	California	Div I	136	71	63	270 (Note: The UCLA count has produced inconsistent and conflicting figures in the past few years, some of which included medals "won" by coaches and staff members. The latest UCLA count claims to include student athletes only, and is thus adopted in this list.)	16		
4	University of California, Berkeley	California	Div I	120	56	46	220	16		
5	University of Texas at Austin	Texas	Div I	88	42	25	155 (Note: University of Texas's current count has overlooked or excluded the medals won by Gabrielle Thomas (1 silver, 1 bronze) at the 2020 Summer Olympics. These medals have been manually added to this list.)	11 (Note: University of Texas's current count has overlooked or excluded the medals won by Gabrielle Thomas (1 silver, 1 bronze) at the 2020 Summer Olympics. These medals have been manually added to this list.)		
6	University of Michigan	Michigan	Div I	71	44	40	155 (Note: This count is fewer than Michigan's count (185=84+47+52) because Michigan's count also includes coaches, staff, etc.)	11		
7	University of Florida	Florida	Div I	69	38	36	143	17		
8	Ohio State University	Ohio	Div I	52	40	26	118	4		
9	Yale University	Connecticut	Div I	52	26	32	110	3		
10	Harvard University	Massachusetts	Div I	46	42	22	110 (Note: This count is fewer than Harvard's count (116=47+48+21) because Harvard's count also includes coaches, staff, etc. On the other hand, Harvard's current count has not been updated to reflect the medals won by Gabrielle Thomas (1 silver, 1 bronze) at the 2020 Summer Olympics – these medals have been manually added to this list.)	2 (Note: Harvard's current count has not been updated to reflect the medals won by Gabrielle Thomas (1 silver, 1 bronze) at the 2020 Summer Olympics – these medals have been manually added to this list.)		

== 11th – 50th ==
Rank	University	State	NCAA	1st place, gold medalist(s)	2nd place, silver medalist(s)	3rd place, bronze medalist(s)	Total	Tokyo 2020	Beijing 2022	References
11	Indiana University Bloomington	Indiana	Div I	51	21	23	95	8		(Note: The two sources provided describe the medals for the entire Indiana University system, while the first source allows to display medals for Indiana University Bloomington only.)
12	University of Washington	Washington	Div I	40	20	21	81	8		
13	University of Arizona	Arizona	Div I	37	27	15	79	5		(Note: The sources from University of Arizona provide conflicting medal counts. The latest sources (2021 & 2016) are used in this list.)
14	University of Minnesota	Minnesota	Div I	26	32	18	76 (Note: This count is fewer than Minnesota's count because Minnesota's count also includes coaches.)	3		
15	University of Pennsylvania	Pennsylvania	Div I	26	28	22	76	0		
16	University of Georgia	Georgia	Div I	30	20	20	70	11		
17	Princeton University	New Jersey	Div I	20	24	26	70	3		
18	Arizona State University	Arizona	Div I	29	12	28	69	0		
19	University of Tennessee	Tennessee	Div I	41	15	12	68	5		
20	Cornell University	New York	Div I	28	24	11	63	2		
21	Pennsylvania State University	Pennsylvania	Div I	14	14	34	62	6		Full list
22	Auburn University	Alabama	Div I	22	?	?	60	6		
23	University of Wisconsin–Madison	Wisconsin	Div I	15	25	13	53 (Note: This count has not included medalists from 2014 & 2018 Winter Olympics, as well as from 2020 Summer Olympics.)	?		
24	University of Nebraska–Lincoln	Nebraska	Div I	15	13	25	53	3		Full list
25	University of North Carolina at Chapel Hill	North Carolina	Div I	35	8	8	51	3		
26	Dartmouth College	New Hampshire	Div I	20	20	11	51	0		
27	California State University, Long Beach	California	Div I	18	14	15	47	0		
28	University of Kansas	Kansas	Div I	32	?	?	45	0		
29	Louisiana State University	Louisiana	Div I	24	10	11	45	11		
30	University of Houston	Texas	Div I	20	13	8	41	0		
31	Boston University	Massachusetts	Div I	16	17	7	40	0		
32	Brown University	Rhode Island	Div I	12	10	17	39	1		
33	Northern Michigan University	Michigan	Div II	6	12	21	39 (Note: The count is based on the sources that counted Olympic medalists from the Northern Michigan University Olympic Training Center. But in reality an athlete may not be a student at the university.)	3		
34	Columbia University	New York	Div I	17	12	9	38	0		
35	Brigham Young University	Utah	Div I	15	18	4	37	0		
36	University of Virginia	Virginia	Div I	17	9	9	35	9		
37	University of California, Irvine	California	Div I	14	17	2	33	6		
38	Michigan State University	Michigan	Div I	15	12	5	32	1		
39	University of Notre Dame	Indiana	Div I	15	3	14	32	8		
40	University of Oregon	Oregon	Div I	13	12	7	32	5		Full list
41	University of Illinois Urbana-Champaign	Illinois	Div I	12	7	13	32	2		
42	Oklahoma State University	Oklahoma	Div I	20	4	7	31	2		
43	Texas A&M University	Texas	Div I	16	6	6	28	7		
44	Purdue University	Indiana	Div I	14	7	6	27 (Note: Purdue's count includes Chris Huffins (bronze medal 2000), who is a coach at Purdue rather than an athlete. He is not included in this list.)	1		
45	University of Miami	Florida	Div I	9	11	7	27	0		
46	University of North Dakota	North Dakota	Div I	7	12	7	26 (Note: This count is likely incomplete.)	?		
47	Syracuse University	New York	Div I	14	8	3	25 (Note: This count is fewer than Syracuse's count (29=18+8+3) because Syracuse's count also includes coaches.)	0		
48	Northwestern University	Illinois	Div I	13	6	5	24 (Note: This count is likely incomplete.)	2		
49	Tennessee State University	Tennessee	Div I	13	7	4	24	0		
50	University of Arkansas	Arkansas	Div I	12	8	4	24	2		

== Other universities (51st–) ==
University	State	NCAA	1st place, gold medalist(s)	2nd place, silver medalist(s)	3rd place, bronze medalist(s)	Total	Tokyo 2020	Beijing 2022	References
Oregon State University	Oregon	Div I	13	4	6	23	1		
Duke University	North Carolina	Div I	12	7	4	23	4		
University of Iowa	Iowa	Div I	14	4	5	23	1		
University of Colorado Boulder	Colorado	Div I	10	5	7	22	2		
San Jose State University	California	Div I	7	7	7	21	2		
University of Oklahoma	Oklahoma	Div I	11	6	3	20	0		
Northeastern University	Massachusetts	Div I	4	8	7	19	1		
Santa Clara University	California	Div I	14	4	0	18 (Note: This count is likely incomplete.)	?		Full list
North Carolina State University	North Carolina	Div I	10	5	3	18	1		
Texas Tech University	Texas	Div I	6	8	3	17	1	1	Full list
University of Alabama	Alabama	Div I	5	5	7	17	5		
Baylor University	Texas	Div I	12	3	1	16	2		
Georgetown University	District of Columbia	Div I	5	5	5	15	0		
University of California, Santa Barbara	California	Div I	11	2	2	15	0		
University of Connecticut	Connecticut	Div I	27	1	7	35			
California State University, Northridge	California	Div I	9	4	1	14			
San Diego State University	California	Div I	8	3	3	14 (Note: This count is likely incomplete. On the other hand, the main source also counted coaches.)	2		
University of South Carolina	South Carolina	Div I	1	6	7	14			Partial list
University of Kentucky	Kentucky	Div I	8	3	1	12 (Note: This count is likely incomplete.)	12		
Williams College	Massachusetts	Div III	3	0	9	12			
Massachusetts Institute of Technology	Massachusetts	Div III	3	4	5	12			
University of Cincinnati	Ohio	Div I	6	4	1	11			
West Virginia University	West Virginia	Div I	7	3	1	11			
Iowa State University	Iowa	Div I	6	1	4	11			
University of Maryland, College Park	Maryland	Div I	6	2	3	11			
Washington State University	Washington	Div I	7	3	1	11	1		
University of Missouri	Missouri	Div I	4	4	2	10	0		
University of California, Davis	California	Div I	10	0	0	10	0		
Florida State University	Florida	Div I	4	2	3	9			
Georgia Tech	Georgia	Div I	6	0	2	8			Full list
Furman University	South Carolina	Div I	4	0	4	8			
University of Chicago	Illinois	Div III	5	2	1	8			
California State Polytechnic University, Pomona	California	Div II	3	1	3	7			
New York University	New York	Div III	1	2	4	7			
Abilene Christian University	Texas	Div I	4	2	0	6			
DeVry University	–	–	1	1	4	6			
Westminster University	Utah	Div II	0	5	1	6			
Fordham University	New York	Div I	3	1	1	5			
Indiana State University	Indiana	Div I	3	1	1	5			
University of Idaho	Idaho	Div I	4	1	0	5			
University of Pittsburgh	Pennsylvania	Div I	3	0	2	5 (Note: Total includes only alumni who competed in their respective sport while attending Pitt (i.e. excludes professional school alumni))			
Vanderbilt University	Tennessee	Div I	2	3	0	5			
Wake Forest University	North Carolina	Div I	3	0	2	5			
California Polytechnic State University, San Luis Obispo	California	Div I	1	3	1	5			
Middlebury College	Vermont	Div III	0	4	1	5			
Rice University	Texas	Div I	1	1	2	4			
University of Alaska Fairbanks	Alaska	Div II	2	1	1	4			
Boston College	Massachusetts	Div I	0	3	0	3			
George Washington University	District of Columbia	Div I	0	1	2	3			
University of Utah	Utah	Div I	0	3	0	3			
California Institute of Technology	California	Div III	0	2	1	3			
College of the Holy Cross	Massachusetts	Div I	1	0	1	2			
University of Central Florida	Florida	Div I	2	0	0	2			
Pennsylvania Western University, California	Pennsylvania	Div II	1	0	1	2			
Robert Morris University	Pennsylvania	Div I	0	2	0	2			
University of New Hampshire	New Hampshire	Div I	0	1	1	2			
Utah Valley University	Utah	Div I	0	1	1	2			
Virginia Tech	Virginia	Div I	0	0	2	2			
Texas State University	Texas	Div I	1	0	0	1			
University of South Florida	Florida	Div I	1	0	0	1			
Brandeis University	Massachusetts	Div III	0	1	0	1			
Colorado Technical University	Colorado	–	0	1	0	1			
Northern Arizona University	Arizona	Div I	0	0	1	1			
Community College of Rhode Island	Rhode Island	–	0	0	1	1			
Emerson College	Massachusetts	Div III	0	0	1	1			
New York Institute of Technology	New York	Div II	0	0	1	1			
Saddleback College	California	–	0	0	1	1			
University of Colorado Colorado Springs	Colorado	Div II	0	0	1	1			
Utah State University	Utah	Div I	0	1	0	1			

== See also ==
- Olympic Games
- Summer Olympic Games
- Winter Olympic Games
