= Interlaken (disambiguation) =

- Interlaken is a town in Switzerland between Lake Brienz and Lake Thun. Interlaken, Interlachen or Interlochen may also refer to:

== Places ==
=== Australia ===
- Interlaken, Tasmania, a locality in central Tasmania
  - Interlaken Lakeside Reserve, a wetland on the Lake Crescent shore of the Interlaken isthmus in Interlaken, Tasmania

=== United States ===
- Interlachen, Florida, a town in Putnam County
- Interlachen, Oregon, a settlement in Multnomah County, near Fairview
- Interlaken, California, a town in Santa Cruz County
- Interlaken, New Jersey, a borough in Monmouth County
- Interlaken, New York, a village in the Finger Lakes Region
- Interlaken, Utah, a town in Wasatch County
- Interlaken, a neighborhood in Lakewood, Washington
- Interlochen, Michigan, a settlement in Grand Traverse County
  - Interlochen Center for the Arts in Interlochen, Michigan
  - Interlochen State Park, Michigan's first state park, in Interlochen
- Interlachen Country Club, a country club in Edina, Minnesota
- Camp Interlaken JCC, a summer camp in Eagle River, Wisconsin
- Interlaken Park, a park in the North Capitol Hill neighborhood of Seattle, Washington
- Lake Innisfree, also known as Interlaken, a lake in New Rochelle, New York

== Other uses ==
- Interlaken (networking), a high-speed serial interconnect protocol
- Interlaken, a variety of seedless grape

== See also ==
- Interlagos
- Entre Lagos
