= UWS =

UWS may refer to:

== Education ==
- Swansea University, a university in Wales formerly known as the University of Wales, Swansea
- University of the West of Scotland, a university operating across four campuses in Scotland
- University of Western States, a university in Portland, Oregon
- University of Western Sydney, a university in Australia
- University of Wisconsin–Green Bay, Sheboygan Campus, a university campus in the United States formerly known as the University of Wisconsin–Sheboygan
- University of Wisconsin–Stout, a university in the United States
- University of Wisconsin–Superior, a university in the United States
- Upper West Success Academy, the former name, renamed Success Academy Upper West, is part of Success Academy Charter Schools
- United World Schools, a non-profit organisation

== Places ==
- Upper West Side, a neighborhood of the borough of Manhattan in New York City, United States

== Sports ==
- United Women's Soccer, a second-division women's soccer league in the United States, founded in 2015
