= Willie Offord =

American football player (born 1978)

No. 24
- Position: Safety

Personal information
- Born: December 22, 1978 (age 47); Palatka, Florida, U.S.
- Listed height: 6 ft 1 in (1.85 m)
- Listed weight: 216 lb (98 kg)

Career information
- High school: Palatka
- College: South Carolina
- NFL draft: 2002: 3rd round, 70th overall pick

Career history
- Minnesota Vikings (2002–2005)

Career NFL statistics
- Tackles: 76
- Interceptions: 2
- Passes defended: 6
- Stats at Pro Football Reference

Willie C. Offord (born December 22, 1978) is an American former professional football player who was a safety for the Minnesota Vikings of the National Football League (NFL).

== Playing career ==
Offord played collegiately at the University of South Carolina finishing his career with the Gamecocks with 185 total tackles, 110 of them being solo tackles.

He was selected in the third round of the 2002 NFL draft with the 70th pick overall by the Minnesota Vikings. He recorded 27 total tackles and one interception in his rookie year, his best year statistically. He has played mostly special teams during his 5-year tenure with the Vikings, serving as the special teams Captain in 2003–2006. Offord was placed on injured reserve just three games into the 2005 season with a devastating knee injury. He was released by the Vikings in 2006 due to a severely broken wrist. Offord retired in 2007 due to injury.

== Coaching career ==
He served as the Head Strength and Conditioning Coach, Linebackers Coach and Special Teams Coordinator for football at Orangeburg Preparatory Schools in Orangeburg, South Carolina. He spent the 2008 football season as the Head Football Coach at Paxon School for Advanced Studies in Jacksonville, Florida. On December 18, 2009, Offord was named the Head Football Coach at Interlachen High School in Interlachen, Florida. Offord is currently the Head Football Coach at North Marion High School (Florida), in Sparr, FL, after working one year as an assistant coach at Newberry College and the year before that as head coach at Columbia (SC) HS. Offord coached his alma mater, Palatka High School in Palatka, FL in the 2012 and 2013 seasons, taking the team to the FHSAA playoffs in 2013. Offord is the Head Football Coach at North Marion High School the 2018 FHSAA class 5A State Runner-up
