= Jarvis Williams (defensive back) =

American football player (1965–2010)

No. 26
- Position: Safety

Personal information
- Born: May 16, 1965; Palatka, Florida, U.S.
- Died: May 25, 2010 (aged 45); Palatka, Florida, U.S.
- Listed height: 5 ft 11 in (1.80 m)
- Listed weight: 200 lb (91 kg)

Career information
- High school: Palatka
- College: Florida
- NFL draft: 1988: 2nd round, 42nd overall pick

Career history
- Miami Dolphins (1988–1993); New York Giants (1994)

Awards and highlights
- First-team All-American (1987); 2× Second-team All-SEC (1986, 1987); University of Florida Athletic Hall of Fame

Career NFL statistics
- Total tackles: 575
- Sacks: 3
- Forced fumbled: 3
- Fumble recoveries: 7
- Interceptions: 16
- Defensive touchdowns: 1
- Stats at Pro Football Reference

Jarvis Eric Williams, Sr. (May 16, 1965 – May 25, 2010) was an American professional football player who was a defensive back for seven seasons in the National Football League (NFL) during the 1980s and 1990s. Williams played college football for the Florida Gators, earning recognition as a first-team All-American in 1987. Thereafter, he played professionally for the Miami Dolphins and the New York Giants of the NFL. Williams died unexpectedly at the age of 45.

== Early life ==
Williams was born in Palatka, Florida, in 1965. He attended Palatka High School, and was a key player for the Palatka Panthers high school football team that won the Florida Class 3A state championship in 1981.

== College career ==
Williams accepted an athletic scholarship to attend the University of Florida in nearby Gainesville, Florida, where he played cornerback for head coach Galen Hall's Florida Gators football teams from 1984 to 1987. As a freshman and sophomore, he was part of two of the best teams in Gators history; the team posted identical 9–1–1 overall win–loss records in 1984 and 1985, and the best-in-the-SEC records of 5–0–1 and 5–1 during those same seasons. Williams is often remembered for the hard-hitting tackle that he delivered to Miami Hurricanes wide receiver Melvin Bratton in 1986—a hit that left Bratton temporarily unconscious. He was named a first-team All-Southeastern Conference (SEC) selection in 1986 and a first-team All-American in 1987. Williams started forty-five consecutive games over four seasons (the second-highest total in Gators history), had ten career interceptions, and led the team in tackles (77) and punt returns (20 for 222 yards) during his senior season.

He was inducted into the University of Florida Athletic Hall of Fame as a "Gator Great" in 2001.

== Professional career ==
Pre-draft measurables
Height	Weight	Hand span	40-yard dash	10-yard split	20-yard split	20-yard shuttle	Vertical jump	Broad jump	Bench press
5 ft 11 3/8 in (1.81 m)	195 lb (88 kg)	9 in (0.23 m)	4.59 s	1.65 s	2.72 s	4.41 s	28.0 in (0.71 m)	8 ft 6 in (2.59 m)	7 reps
All values from NFL Combine

Williams was chosen by the Miami Dolphins in the second round (forty-second pick overall) of the 1988 NFL draft. He played safety for the Dolphins from 1988 to 1993. In Miami, Williams was reunited with his former Gators teammate Louis Oliver when the Dolphins drafted Oliver in 1989; together they were the Dolphins' starting safeties for five seasons. In his first five NFL seasons with the Dolphins, Williams recorded fourteen interceptions, including one he returned forty-two yards for a touchdown in 1990.

He played his final NFL season for the New York Giants in 1994. During the season, he recorded sixty tackles and two interceptions in thirteen games.

During his seven-season NFL career, Williams played in 104 regular season games and started in ninety-five of them; he recorded 575 tackles and sixteen interceptions, with one touchdown return.

== Life after the NFL ==
Williams worked as a volunteer assistant football coach at Interlachen High School in Interlachen, Florida, and as an assistant coach at Trinity Catholic High School in Ocala, Florida.

Williams' son, Jarvis Eric Williams, Jr., was the starting fullback from 2009 to 2010 for the Jacksonville University Dolphins football team, and was named the 2007 Pioneer Football League Newcomer of the Year by Street & Smith's College Football annual as the starting Linebacker for the Dolphins in his freshman season. Williams' former Gators teammate, quarterback Kerwin Bell, was the coach of JU at the time.

Williams died suddenly and without prior warning from an acute asthma attack just before midnight on May 25, 2010; he was 45 years old.

== See also ==
- 1987 College Football All-America Team
- List of Florida Gators football All-Americans
- List of Florida Gators in the NFL draft
- List of University of Florida Athletic Hall of Fame members
- List of Miami Dolphins players
- List of New York Giants players
