= Palatka High School =

- PHS

Location
- 302 Mellon Rd; Palatka, Florida; United States; 29.644614°N 81.669736°W

Information
- Type: Public High School
- Motto: Pride Honor Success
- Established: 1977
- Status: Open
- School district: Putnam County School District (Florida)
- Oversight: Rick Surrency
- Faculty: ~100
- Teaching staff: 76.00 (FTE)
- Grades: 7 - 12
- Enrollment: 1,639 (2022-23)
- Student to teacher ratio: 21.57
- Colors: Blue and gold
- Athletics: FB, BB, BKB, SB, SOC, SW, XC, VB.
- Mascot: Panthers
- Rivals: Interlachen High School; Keystone Heights High School
- Accreditation: AdvancED
- Website: www.putnamschools.org/o/phs

Palatka High School is a public high school located in Palatka, Florida, operated by the Putnam County School District (Florida). The school was established 1977 after merging two existing schools - Palatka Central and Palatka South. The campus has completed several renovation projects with science labs, new classrooms, a performing arts area, and office areas. Palatka High School serves the Palatka and East Palatka areas. Current student enrollment is about 1,400, drawing students from Jenkins Middle School. Students attend 7 classes per day, taking a wide variety of courses, including dual enrollment courses at St. Johns River State College. PHS offers Honors and AP courses and a variety of elective classes including Art and Journalism. Florida Virtual School is also an option for students.

== Notable alumni ==
- Greg Mullins — professional baseball player (Milwaukee Brewers)
- Bill Swaggerty — professional baseball player (Baltimore Orioles)
- Michelle McCool — WWE wrestler, WWE Divas Champion
- Willie Offord — NFL defensive back (Minnesota Vikings)
- Charles Smith — American football player
- John L. Williams — NFL running back (Seattle Seahawks) (Pittsburgh Steelers)
- Jarvis Williams — NFL safety (Miami Dolphins) (New York Giants)
- John Crawford — New York Times Bestselling author
- Bryan Jacob — bantam and featherweight weightlifter, 1992 and 1996 Olympics
