= Reservoir 2 =

- Location in New York
- Location: Northern New Rochelle, Westchester County, New York
- Coordinates: 40°56′20″N 73°48′18″W
- Type: Reservoir
- Primary inflows: Hutchinson River
- Basin countries: United States
- Max. length: 550 ft (170 m)
- Surface area: 18.3 acres (7.4 ha)
- Water volume: 37×10^{6} US gal (140,000 m^{3})

Reservoir 2 is located in the northern portion of the city of New Rochelle along the New Rochelle - Eastchester boundary in Westchester County, New York. Built in 1892, the reservoir is impounded by the "Reservoir 2 dam" on the Hutchinson River. The dam is masonry and of earthen construction, with a height of 25 feet (7.6 m) and a length of 550 feet (170 m). It has a water area of about 18.3 acres (7.4 ha) and a capacity of about 37 million US gallons (140,000 m^{3}). Maximum discharge is 800 cubic feet (23 m^{3}) per second. The reservoir is owned by the City Of New Rochelle.

Reservoir 2 lies approximately one-tenth of a mile (160 m) south of Reservoir 1, Lake Innisfree. The water from this reservoir, and from Reservoir 3, was originally pumped at a pumping station into the mains of the high service system to serve the northern portions of New Rochelle.
