= Hutchinson River =

River in New York, United States

Hutchinson River East Chester Creek, Eastchester Creek, Eastchester River, Hutchins Creek, Hutchinson Creek, Hutchinson's Brook, Hutchinson's River, Hutchinsons River
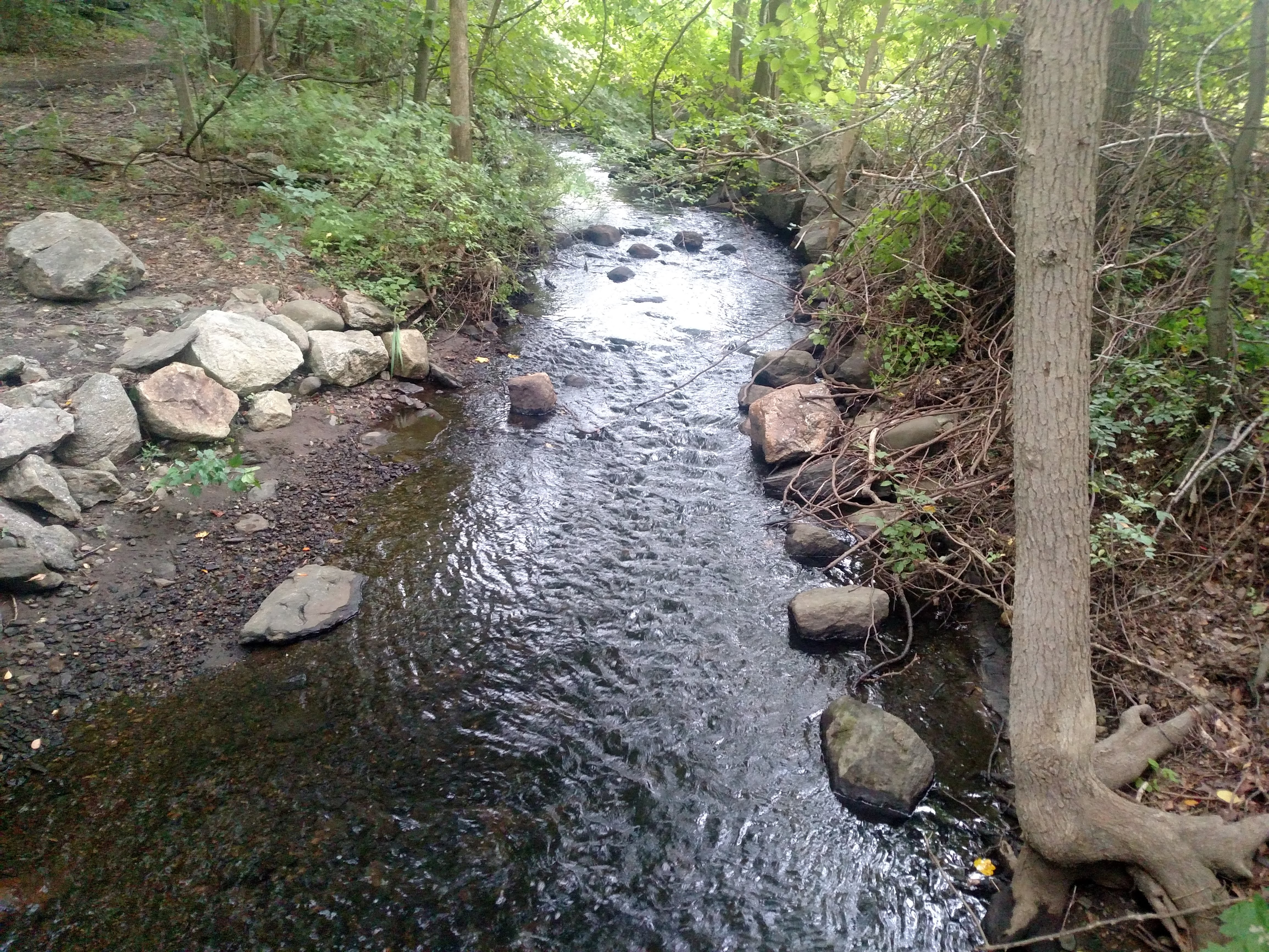
- River in Twin Lakes County Park between Lake Innisfree and Reservoir 3
- Native name: Aquacanounck, Aqueanounck, Aqueanouncke (Munsee)

Location
- Country: United States
- State: New York
- Region: Greater New York City
- Counties: Westchester, Bronx
- Cities, towns and villages: Scarsdale, New Rochelle, Eastchester, Mount Vernon, Pelham Manor, Pelham and New York City

Physical characteristics
- Source: confluence of unnamed streams
  - location: Scarsdale–New Rochelle municipal boundary
  - coordinates: 40.9862°N 73.7863°W
  - elevation: 235 ft (72 m)
- Mouth: Eastchester Bay
  - location: Bronx, New York
  - coordinates: 40.8539°N 73.8078°W
  - elevation: 0 ft (0 m)
- Length: 10 mi (16 km)
- Basin size: 19.4 mi^{2} (50 km^{2})
- Discharge
  - location: Pelham
  - average: 7.24 cubic feet per second (0.205 m^{3}/s)
  - minimum: 0.01 cubic feet per second (0.00028 m^{3}/s)
  - maximum: 526 cubic feet per second (14.9 m^{3}/s)

The Hutchinson River is a 10-mile-long (16 km) freshwater stream located in the New York City borough of the Bronx and Southern Westchester County, New York, United States. It forms on the New Rochelle–Scarsdale municipal line off Brookline Road in the latter community and flows south, draining a 19.4-square-mile (50 km^{2}) area. It continues to serve as New Rochelle's city line with Eastchester; further downstream; its lower reaches divide Mount Vernon and Pelham until it enters the Bronx and empties into Long Island Sound's Eastchester Bay.

The river is named for Anne Hutchinson, who came from Rhode Island in 1642 and settled on Pelham Neck to the east of the river, across from where Co-op City is now.

Much of the land in the Hutchinson's watershed has been extensively developed over the last century as the New York metropolitan area grew and suburbanized. Along all but its uppermost and lowermost stretches, it is paralleled by the Hutchinson River Parkway. At three points along its length it has been dammed to create reservoirs. Its lower three miles (4.8 km) are commercially navigable and still in use by shipping.

As a result of all this pressure, the river is seriously polluted. The New York State Department of Environmental Conservation rates the entire stream as impaired to an extent that it cannot be used as drinking water or recreationally; local authorities discourage eating any fish caught from the Hutchinson. Efforts to clean up the river have begun both in the form of remediation programs and lawsuits against polluters.

== Course ==
=== Headwaters ===
The main stem of the Hutchinson rises from a confluence of two short streams off Brookline Road in an extensively developed residential area of single-family homes on large lots in Scarsdale, at an elevation roughly 235 ft (72 m) above sea level. From its source the river serves as the boundary between Scarsdale and the city of New Rochelle to the east. It flows southwesterly, heavily channelized, between backyards 400 ft (120 m) to its first crossing, a street known as Drake Road in Scarsdale and Baraud Road in New Rochelle.

Below the bridge, the Hutchinson continues winding, still decoratively channelized and with several small wooden private pedestrian bridges, through the backyards of houses on the east side of Forest and East Woods lanes on the Scarsdale side. Sloping woodland buffers the backyards, on Abington Lane and Tewkesbury Road in New Rochelle. A little over a half-mile (800 m) south of the bridge, the river enters a larger patch of woods south of the Tunstall Road dead end in Scarsdale, west of Primrose Road in New Rochelle.

After winding another 700 ft (210 m) to the south, the Hutchinson bends southeastward to where Scarsdale Boulevard (just Boulevard in Scarsdale) crosses. From there it soon returns to its southwest course as it flows 800 ft (240 m) through another wooded area between houses to its next crossing, Sprague Road. Another 500 ft (150 m) below that bridge, as the river again divides houses in the narrowing space between Clarence Road on the west and Charlotte Lane to the east, it becomes the boundary between New Rochelle and Eastchester.

The Hutchinson continues to flow slightly to the southwest alongside Wilmot Road, dividing lots on it and Old Wilmot Road in Eastchester for the next quarter-mile (400 m). The houses and lots are smaller than those further upstream in Scarsdale. It then bends more to the southwest, paralleling Wilmot, as it enters a 300-foot (91 m) culvert carrying it under Old and New Wilmot roads. Another quarter-mile downstream, with wooded strips buffering it on either side, it crosses under Lakeshore Drive and then widens into Reservoir No. 1, or Lake Innisfree.

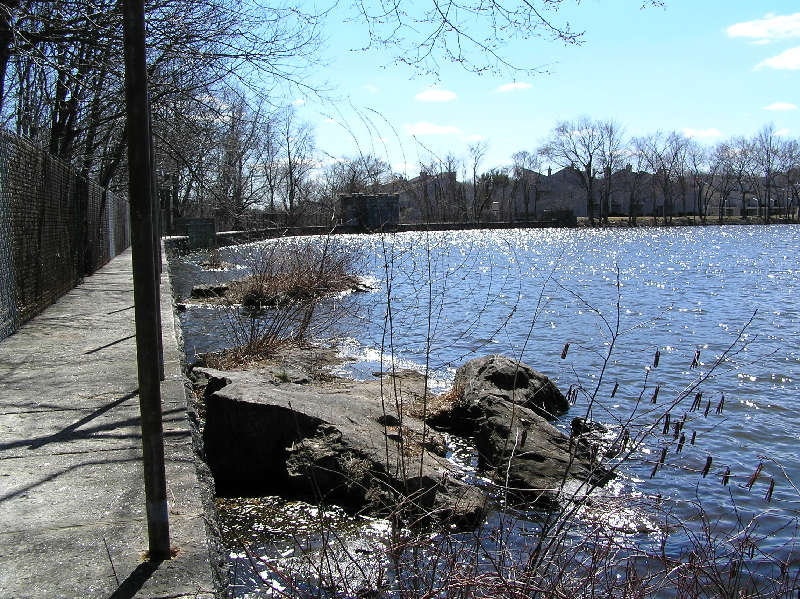
Lake Innisfree, originally Reservoir 1

At the 65-acre (26 ha) V-shaped lake the Hutchinson has descended to 184 ft (56 m). It flows out through a narrow spillway on the lake's southeastern shore, crossing under a footbridge and then immediately bending southwest to begin several miles of closely paralleling the Hutchinson River Parkway, a four-lane limited-access grade-separated highway. The river goes through a series of culverts under the ramps of the parkway's Mill Road exit immediately to the south. While still flowing close by the parkway, it enters the mostly wooded Twin Lakes County Park, the least developed area it has flowed through by this point.

=== Twin Lakes County Park ===
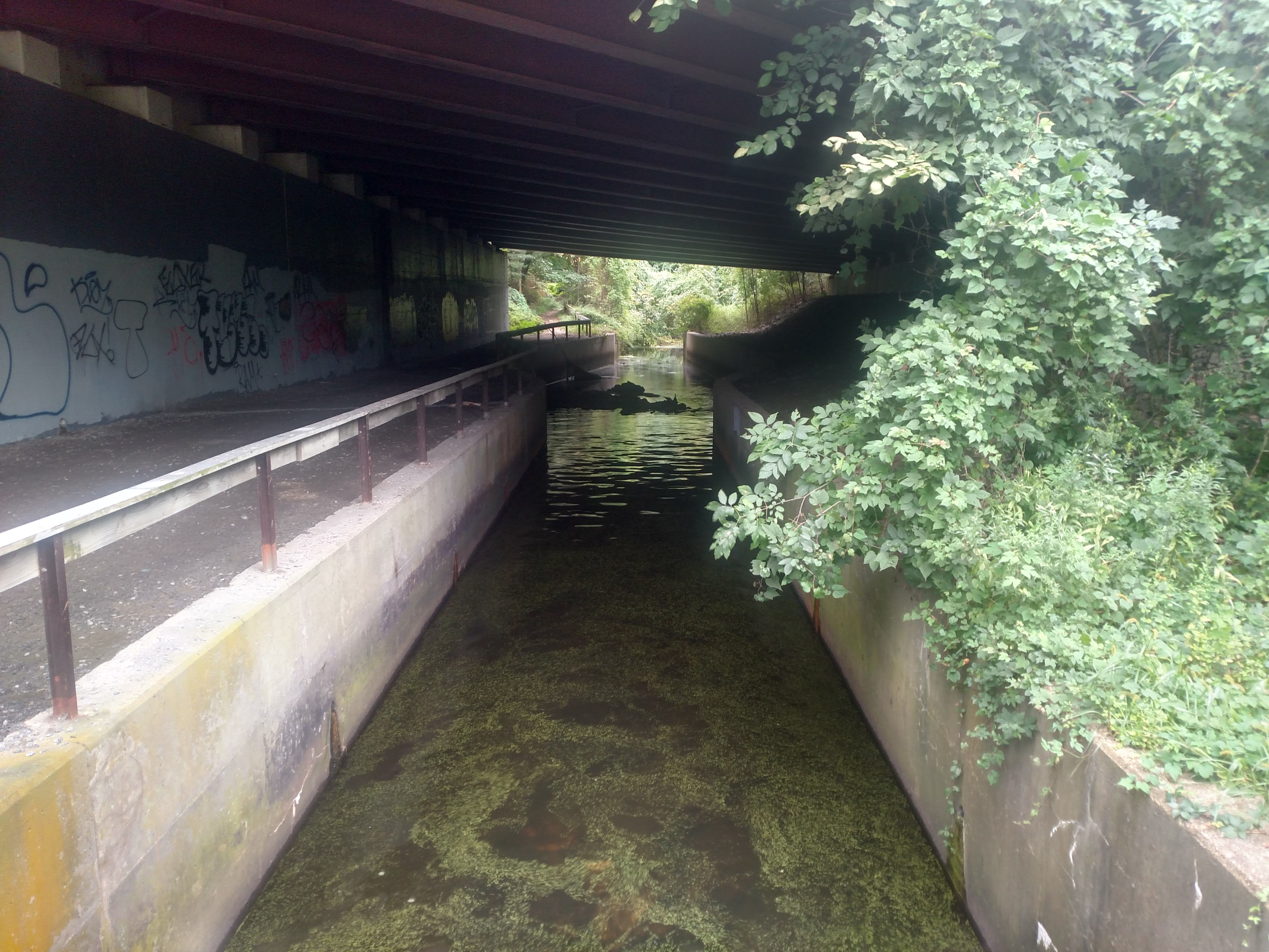
The channelized Hutchinson flowing under the parkway just below Reservoir 3

Approximately 0.3 miles (480 m) downstream of Lake Innisfree, the Hutchinson opens up into 30-acre (12 ha) Reservoir 3, having descended to 123 ft (37 m) in elevation. Another quarter-mile to the south, it flows out of the lake via a spillway in the dam at its southern end, then crosses under a park road and then the parkway for the first of several times, just south of the Webster Avenue exit. From there it continues flowing, first through a small unnamed lake, slightly to the southwest through the wooded parkland to the 18.3-acre (7.4 ha) Reservoir 2, 95 ft (29 m) above sea level.

Reservoir 2 is actually two separate lakes connected by 500 ft (150 m) of stream just east of the parkway. After almost a half-mile (900 m), the Hutchinson flows out the spillway of another dam just above a state highway garage complex adjoining the interchange with the Cross County Parkway. The river follows the parkway for another 600 ft (180 m), curving southeast and then east; after the bridge into the garage complex it begins to separate from the parkway.

The Hutchinson gets to its greatest distance from the parkway here, 750 ft (230 m) to its east at one point over the river's next 0.8 mi (1.3 km), before returning to cross under the road and flow southwest again just north of the Pelhamdale Road exit. Just before it flows under New Rochelle Road, the border of that community leaves the river channel. South of that bridge, it enters Mount Vernon and after another 1,000 feet (300 m) again forms a municipal boundary, between Mount Vernon and the village of Pelham, once it crosses under the exit ramps for the southbound parkway.

=== The Pelhams ===
Remaining within the narrow strip of woodland between the parkway and Hutchinson Boulevard to the west, the river bends a bit more towards the south over its next 0.3 miles (480 m) to the Cross County Parkway connector, where it goes through a 350-foot (110 m) culvert. After emerging, it remains in the much narrower space between the roads for another thousand feet to where it flows through another culvert under the parkway to its east side, paralleling River Avenue briefly before it flows under East Lincoln Avenue and the offramps for that exit, then a footbridge next to the intersection of First Avenue and Third Street, before crossing under the parkway again and turning south into Pelham Lake, 43 ft (13 m) above sea level, in Willson's Woods Park.

At the south end of the 800-foot-long (240 m) lake, the Hutchinson flows over a small stone dam and then under the parkway again. On the other side, the river turns southwest again, flows under the railroad tracks used by Metro-North Railroad's New Haven Line commuter service. After 200 ft (61 m), it turns and is again crossed by the parkway, having descended to 27 ft (8.2 m) above sea level.

The Hutchinson again turns slightly southeast. Another 200 feet downstream a pedestrian bridge between Beechwood Avenue in Mount Vernon and Sparks Avenue in Pelham crosses both river and parkway. The river, closely paralleling the parkway, bends to the south over its next thousand feet to where East Third Street and the offramp to it from the parkway cross over. Immediately to the south it borders Mount Vernon's small Migui Park. Another thousand feet downstream, after the river and parkway curve slightly southwest again, Colonial Avenue crosses over. At this point Pelham Manor becomes the village on the east of the river.

A hundred feet (30 m) to the south, bending more to the west briefly, the Hutchinson crosses under three roadways: the ramps between Colonial and the southbound parkway, and the access road to the Glover athletic complex to the south. The river again flows southwest, and another hundred feet downstream a footbridge from the parking lot to the fields crosses over. The Hutchinson diverges from the parkway's side over the next 0.3 miles (480 m), flowing 500 feet (150 m) to its east as the fields and tennis courts interpose themselves. On the river's west, land use changes to commercial.

South of the Glover complex the Hutchinson widens, bears more to the southwest, further away from the parkway, and enters an industrial area, with tank farms and warehouses aside. This the upper limit of commercial navigation on the river, and a thousand feet into it a 500-foot terminal branches off to the northwest. Another 350 ft (110 m) to the south Pelham Parkway (South Fulton Avenue in Mount Vernon) crosses on a steel mesh drawbridge. And 300 feet (91 m) south of that bridge, a pipeline is elevated high above the river bed. The river veers slightly into a straight south-southwest course, now wide enough that barges can moor along its banks, and 500 feet from the pipeline it is briefly entirely within Mount Vernon as Pelham Manor gives way to the New York City borough of The Bronx on the east side. After 200 feet (61 m), the Hutchinson crosses the city limit itself.

=== The Bronx ===
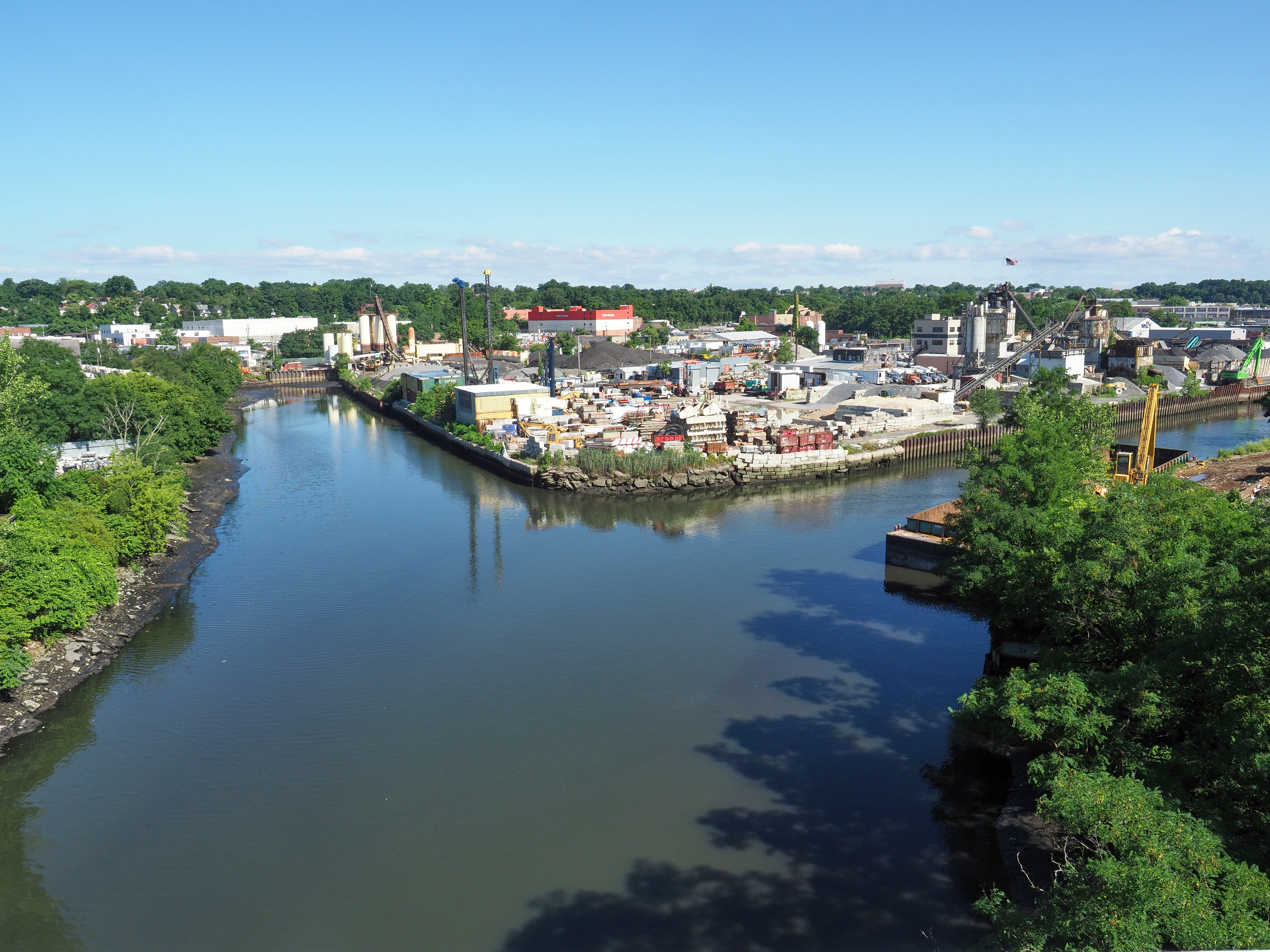
View upstream from Eastchester Bridge. Main channel of the river is to the right.

Two hundred feet into the Bronx neighborhood also known as Eastchester, the Hutchinson bends southeast as another 500-foot terminal extends to the west-northwest. Another 200 feet downstream, Boston Road (U.S. Route 1) crosses over on the four-lane Eastchester Bridge. The river bends slightly and then back over its next thousand feet, growing wider just above where the New England Thruway (Interstate 95) crosses over.

South of the Thruway, the Hutchinson bends again to a south-southwest course, now a hundred feet wide, flowing straight between an industrial area on its west and wetlands on the east, part of the Thomas Pell Wildlife Sanctuary in nearby Pelham Bay Park. The parkway returns to the river's vicinity, paralleling it 500 feet to the west. A thousand feet south of the Thruway the industrial properties give way to the Co-op City housing development.

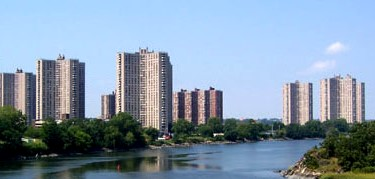
Co-Op City and the river

After flowing past Co-Op City for 0.6 mi (0.97 km), the Hutchinson, now below 10 ft (3.0 m) in elevation, with a dredged channel in its middle, bends southeast as the parkway crosses for the last time. Immediately downstream, the river widens into an estuary, with tidal flats on its eastern shore and housing projects on its west, with small Goose Island just offshore. Another 0.3 mi (0.48 km) downstream from the parkway, the Pelham Bay Bridge carries Amtrak's Northeast Corridor passenger service over the river. A small bay protrudes on the south side of the river, and 500 feet downstream the 891-foot (272 m) Pelham Bridge, the lowest bridge on the Hutchinson, carries Shore Road across.

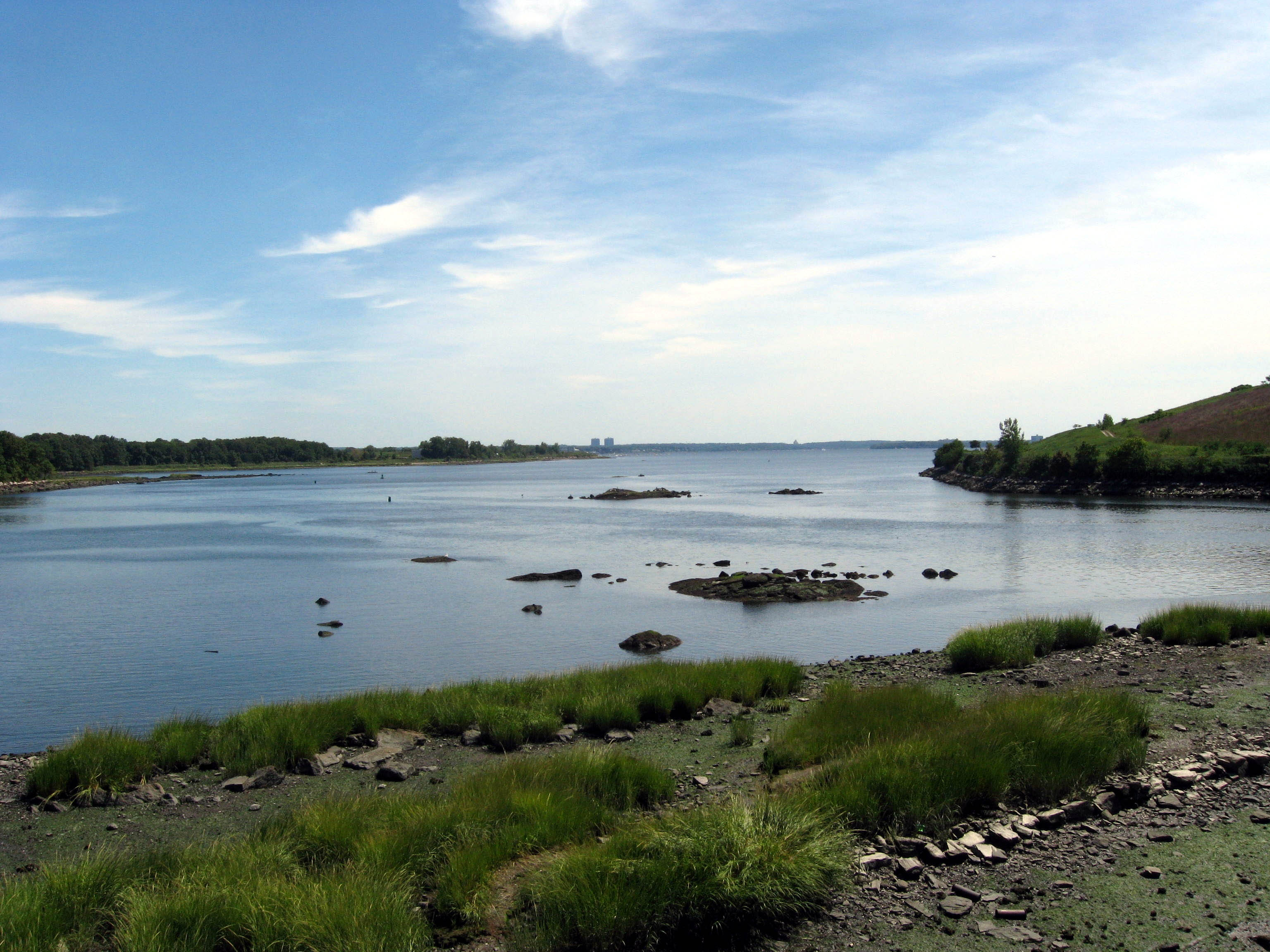
The mouth of the Hutchinson

Below the bridge the Hutchinson widens into its mouth, becoming Eastchester Bay near the west end of Long Island Sound, with the Country Club neighborhood on its west and Rodman's Neck and City Island on the east.

== Watershed ==
The Hutchinson's 19.4-square-mile (50 km^{2}) watershed generally extends for a mile (1.6 km) (Note: At its westernmost extent, near Laconia Avenue between 222nd and 225th streets, it reaches 1.8 mi (2.9 km) from the river) to the Bronx River watershed on its west. On the river's east there is less distance, generally a half-mile (800 m), to the Mamaroneck–Sheldrake watershed, reaching nearly a mile into New Rochelle near Pelham Lake. At the north end, the watershed extends less than a thousand feet from the river's source, including the watershed's highest point, the 300-foot (91 m) intersection of Heathcote Road and Morris Lane in Scarsdale.

The terrain in the watershed is generally level and densely developed either as urban multiple-unit housing, suburban single-family homes or intense commercial and industrial use. Twin Lakes County Park is the only significant area of open space above the Hutchinson's estuary.

== Navigation ==
The Hutchinson River is navigable for its southernmost three miles (4.8 km). Tugs and barges and the occasional small tanker still make their way to the terminals that are still operating. The northernmost active terminal, Sprague Energy located at 100 Canal St. in Mount Vernon, still accepts barges of heating oil, ULSD, and biodiesel blends daily. The other two active docks are PASCAP, which exports scrap metal, and the former Colonial Sand and Gravel dock, which accepts scows full of aggregate to make cement and asphalt. The river is suffering from neglect, and although it was dredged in 2010, the northernmost section was not and is filling in with silt. Only shallow draft barges can reach Sprague terminal and only at high water; at lower tides squat can cause barges to beach. The northernmost dock in the dredged project, Imperia Brothers Inc., has not been able to accept a scow of aggregates since 2007 due to the silt build-up.

Some shipping accidents in the past have affected the river. In March 1934 a tug struck a rock while navigating an ice field under the Pelham Bay Bridge and began leaking; a rowboat was used to evacuate the crew of five before it sank. The United States Coast Guard closed the river to navigation fora a day after an April 1967 accident, when a tanker began leaking gasoline after striking a submerged obstacle. The leak was not discovered until it reached its terminal at Edison Avenue in Mount Vernon shortly afterwards. Anti-combustion foam was sprayed on the river.

== Crossings ==
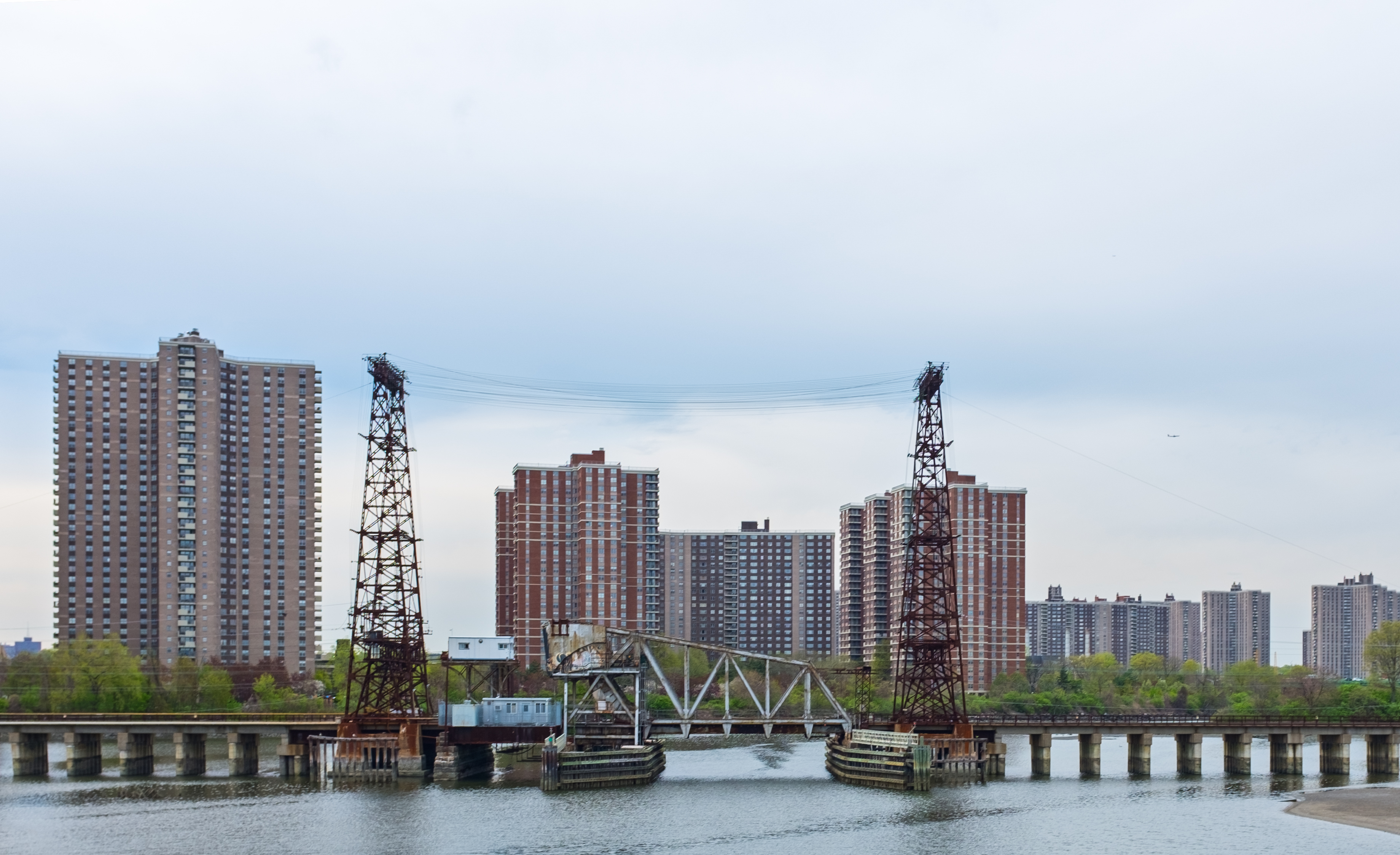
The Pelham Bay Bridge carries Amtrak's Northeast Corridor

Six bridges span the river's navigable section, carrying rail and automobile traffic. They are, from downstream heading upstream: Pelham Bridge (movable), Amtrak's Pelham Bay Bridge (movable), Hutchinson River Parkway (movable), New England Thruway (fixed), and Eastchester Bridge (Boston Post Road) (fixed), in the Bronx; and Fulton Avenue Bridge in Pelham Manor (movable). The movable bridges still employ tenders and open daily for maritime traffic.

== Reservoirs ==
The New Rochelle Water Company dammed the Hutchinson River at three places between 1886 and 1907, creating three reservoirs at the northern end of the community. The Westchester County Park Commission purchased the reservoirs and the surrounding water shed property in 1927, for parkland and parkway purposes. A part of the land was used for the Hutchinson River Parkway, which follows the river for most of its distance.

The three reservoirs are numbered in the order they were built. Reservoir No. 1, which is now known as Lake Innisfree, is furthest upstream, and was constructed in 1886. Lake Innisfree is the largest of the reservoirs. It is mostly surrounded by private land, but its dam and part of its eastern shore can be accessed on foot by the Leatherstocking Trail. The Hutchinson River runs about .75 miles (1.21 km) from Lake Innisfree to the northern reaches of Reservoir 3, constructed in 1907. Immediately after exiting Reservoir 3 the river flows under the Hutchinson River Parkway and then only about one-tenth of a mile (160 m) to Reservoir 2, which was constructed in 1892 and is the smallest of the three. Reservoir 3 and Reservoir 2 are both contained within Twin Lakes County Park and are accessible by the Leatherstocking Trail and other trails. The three reservoirs are no longer used as a water supply.

== Environmental issues ==
The southern part of Hutchinson River has become polluted due to outflow of raw sewage from Mount Vernon. Plumes of polluted water have flowed downstream and negatively affected the river's fish population. This issue was first noted in 2003, prompting a cleanup directive from the EPA. The town faced several fines by 2017, having not taken action to mitigate pollution for two decades, and in 2020, received a federal court order calling for compliance with the Clean Water Act. In 2019, the New York environmental organization Riverkeeper sued J. Bass & Son Inc., a scrap metal company based in Mount Vernon, for polluting the river under the Clean Water Act. A project to repair the broken sewage collection line in Mount Vernon, funded by the New York State Department of Environmental Conservation, was underway as of May 2023.

In 2010, the Hutchinson River Restoration Project, a nonprofit organization, began working on volunteer-led restoration efforts to help protect the river and its habitat.

== See also ==
- List of New York rivers
- Saw Mill River, another Lower Westchester stream known for the road named for it that parallels it
