= Shem-Tov Sabag =

Israeli former Olympic marathoner (born 1959)

Personal information
- Native name: שם טוב סבג
- Full name: Also Shemi Sabag, and Shemi Sagiv
- Nickname: Shemi
- Nationality: Israeli
- Born: April 13, 1959 (age 67) Haifa, Israel
- Education: Augustana College; University of Oregon (Bachelors in Exercise Physiology '86; Masters in Biomechanics and Gait Analysis '89); University of Western States (Doctor of Chiropractic '93)
- Occupation(s): chiropractor, triathlon coach
- Height: 1.65 m (5 ft 5 in)
- Weight: 52 kg (115 lb)
- Relative(s): Shachar Sagiv and Ran Sagiv, Olympic triathletes (sons)

Sport
- Country: Israel
- Sport: Running
- Races: cross-country, 5,000 metres, 10,000 metres, 25K, half marathon, and marathon
- College team: Augustana Vikings, Oregon Ducks

Achievements and titles
- National finals: Israeli national marathon champion (1984, 1987)
- Personal bests: Half Marathon: 1:06:13; Marathon: 2:18:23
Medal record
Representing Israel
Men's marathon
Vancouver Marathon
Gold medal – first place	1989 Vancouver	Individual
Tiberias Marathon
Silver medal – second place	1984 Tiberias	Individual

Shem-Tov "Shemi" Sabag; later known by the surname Sagiv (Hebrew: שם טוב "שמי" סבג; born April 13, 1959) is an Israeli former Olympic marathoner, former triathlon coach, and currently a chiropractor. He competed for Israel at the 1984 Summer Olympics in Los Angeles. He won both the 1984 Lake County Marathon, and the 1989 Vancouver Marathon. His sons Shachar Sagiv and Ran Sagiv have both competed in the Olympics in the triathlon.

== Early and personal life ==
Sabag was born in Haifa, Israel, later lived in Zichron Yaakov and Tiberias, Israel, and is Jewish. He started running marathons at age 17, at the urging of a high school coach, but lost three years of training as he served with a tank unit in the Israel Defense Forces. He later changed his surname to Sagiv.

His sons Shachar Sagiv and Ran Sagiv have both competed in the Olympics in the triathlon, coming in 20th and 35th, respectively, in the Tokyo Olympics held in 2021. His son Shachar, whom he coached until 2021, will represent Israel at the 2024 Summer Olympics in Paris in the Men's triathlon at Pont Alexandre III on July 30, 2024.

== Education ==
He studied as a pre-med student at Augustana College in Rock Island, Illinois, in 1983 and 1984. In the summer of 1983, between semesters at Augustana, he worked at Camp Interlaken, developing a running program.

In the winter of 1984-85, he transferred to the University of Oregon, in Eugene, Oregon. In 1986 he obtained a bachelor's degree from the University of Oregon in exercise physiology.

From 1986 to 1989 he studied biomechanics and gait analysis as a graduate student at the University of Oregon, earning a master's degree. During that time, he ran for a year for the Oregon Ducks.

From 1989 to 1993 he studied at the University of Western States in Portland, Oregon, earning a Doctor of Chiropractic degree, and is now a chiropractor.

== Running career ==
=== 1983–84; 2x All American, 2x CCIW 5,000 meter champion, CCIW cross-country champion, Lake County Marathon champion ===
At Augustana College, he was an All-American in cross-country in 1983 and 1984. In 1983, he was the College Conference of Illinois & Wisconsin (CCIW) 5,000 meter champion, and won the silver medal in the CCIW Cross-Country championship, with a time of 24.49. In November 1983, he came in 8th in the NCAA Men's Division III Cross Country Championship in Newport News, Virginia.

In May 1984, in a season in which he was co-captain of the Augustana Vikings Track and Field team, he came in 2nd in the 10,000 meters (in 30:18.48) and 6th in the 5,000 meters, at the NCAA Division III men's outdoor track and field championships in Northfield, Minnesota. He also set the record in the CCIW 5,000 meters in 1984 (while winning the title for the second straight year), with a time of 14:24.36 (still a CCIW championships record as of 2021), and that year also set the Credit Island Park four-mile course record with a time of 19:33 (as of 2009, that was still a school record in the four-mile). In 1984 he won the CCIW cross-country championship, with a time of 24:52.7, after having won the silver medal in 1983, and also won the Notre Dame Invitational in South Bend, Indiana, with a time of 24.06. He was named team MVP in both 1983 and 1984.

In April 1984 he won his first marathon in his eighth race at that distance, in Chicago, Illinois, in the Lake County Marathon in 2:21:47.

His personal best time in the marathon was 2:18:23, which he ran in June 1984 in Duluth, Minnesota.

=== 1984 Summer Olympics ===
He competed for Israel at the 1984 Summer Olympics in Los Angeles, California, at the age of 25. He had qualified with his time in his third marathon in three and a half months. Running in the Men's Marathon in August 1984 he came in 60th out of 107 competitors, with a time of 2-31:34. When he competed in the Olympics, Sabag was 5 feet 6 inches (168 cm) tall and weighed 139 pounds (63 kg). Speaking of the Munich Massacre, which had taken place 12 years earlier at the Olympics, he said: "As a representative of Israel, I am here to do what they tried to do. We are here to continue their job."

=== 1984–present; Israel national marathon champion, Vancouver Marathon champion ===
In December 1984 he won the silver medal in the Tiberias Marathon in Israel, with a time of 2:22:15, behind British marathoner Lindsay Robertson, and won the Israeli national marathon championship.

In the mid-1980s, after transferring, he ran for the University of Oregon Ducks track and field team, under coach Bill Dellinger.

His personal best in the half-marathon was 1-06:13, which he ran in Philadelphia, Pennsylvania, in September 1986. Also that month, he won the New York Road Runners Club Back-To-Work 4-Mile Run in 19 minutes, 10 seconds in Central Park.

In 1987 he won the Israeli national marathon championship in a time of 2:27:57.

In September 1988, he won the 18th annual NIKE/OTC (Nike/Oregon Track Club) 25K in Eugene, Oregon, with a time of 1:20:26.

Sabag won the Vancouver Marathon in Canada in May 1989 with a time of 2:19:41. He did so against a field of 1,109 finishers.

== See also ==
- List of University of Oregon Olympians
