= Pelham Bay Bridge =

Bridge in the Bronx, New York

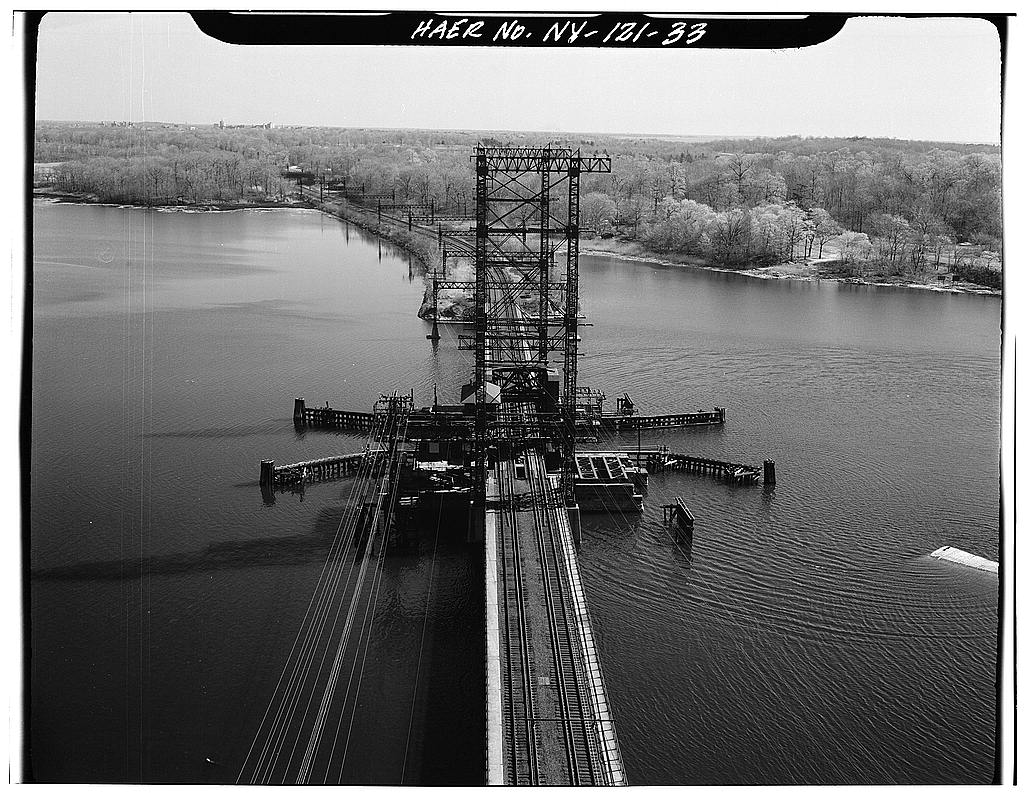
- Coordinates: 40.8634°N 73.8179°W
- Crosses: Hutchinson River
- Locale: The Bronx, New York
- Official name: Pelham Bay Bridge
- Maintained by: Amtrak

Characteristics
- Design: Bascule bridge, Warren truss
- Material: Concrete, Steel
- Longest span: 81.7 feet (24.9 m)

History
- Designer: Scherzer Rolling Lift Bridge Co., Chicago, Illinois
- Opened: 1907

The Pelham Bay Bridge, also known as the Amtrak Hutchinson River Bridge, is a two-track movable railroad bridge that carries the Northeast Corridor (NEC) over the Hutchinson River in the Bronx, New York, upstream from the vehicular/pedestrian Pelham Bridge. It is owned by Amtrak, which provides passenger service, and is used by CSX Transportation and the Providence & Worcester Railroad for freight traffic.

== History ==
The New York, New Haven and Hartford Railroad completed construction of the bridge in 1907, which originally consisted of three parallel two-track spans. Amtrak partially rehabilitated it in 2009. The bridge is obsolete and requires extensive ongoing maintenance, with speeds restricted to 45 miles per hour (72 km/h). The lift span is staffed and required to open on demand; it does so several times per day for commercial boats.

== Bridge replacement project ==
Amtrak plans to replace the bridge with a new high-level fixed bridge with clearance for maritime traffic. Preliminary work began in 2013. MTA's Metro-North Railroad has proposed the Penn Station Access using the bridge for a so-called Hell Gate Line service which would allow some New Haven Line trains to access New York Penn Station. In January 2019, Amtrak and the MTA reached an agreement regarding Penn Station Access. As part of the deal, the MTA would pay to replace the Pelham Bay Bridge.

In August 2022 the Federal Railroad Administration (FRA) awarded a $4.5 million grant to Amtrak for the bridge replacement project. In November 2022 the FRA published its inventory of pending improvement projects for the Northeast Corridor. The report lists the replacement of the Pelham Bay Bridge as one of 15 "Major Backlog Projects" which have the highest priority for funding.

In June 2023, Amtrak applied for additional FRA grants to support multiple improvement projects in the Northeast Corridor, including additional work on the Pelham Bay Bridge project.

== See also ==
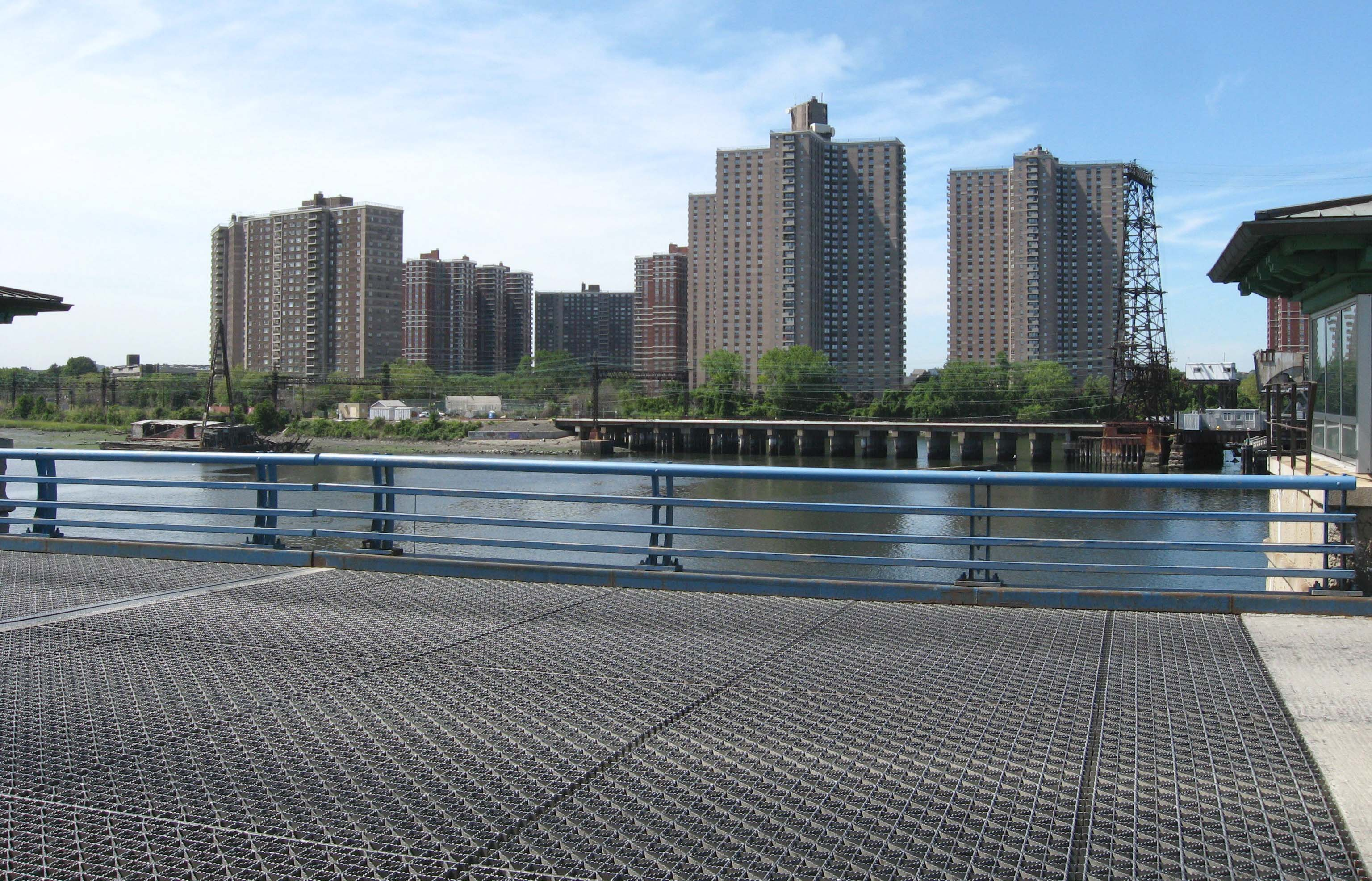
As seen from Pelham Bridge with Co-op City in background

- Electrification of the New York, New Haven, and Hartford Railroad
- Gateway Project (planned NEC expansion and renovation project)
- New York Connecting Railroad
- Train to the Game
