= Pelham Bridge =

Bridge in the Bronx, New York

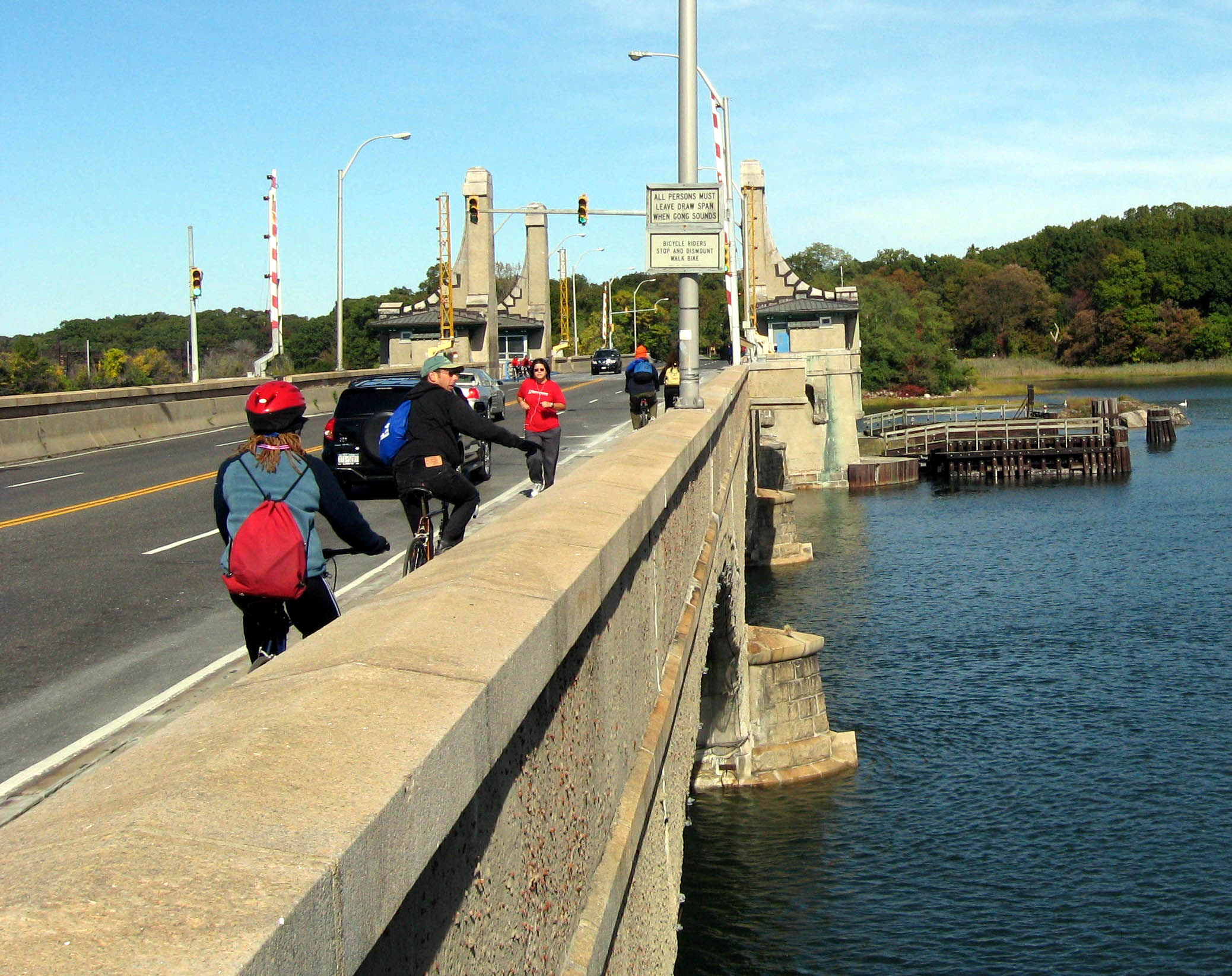
- Downstream side of bridge
- Coordinates: 40.86204°N 73.81582°W
- Carries: Shore Road, Pedestrians, Bicycles
- Crosses: Hutchinson River
- Locale: New York City (The Bronx)
- Official name: Pelham Bridge
- Maintained by: New York City Department of Transportation

Characteristics
- Design: Bascule bridge
- Material: Concrete, Steel
- Total length: 891 feet (272 m)
- Width: Roadway:40 feet (12 m), Sidewalk:7.5 feet (2.3 m)
- Longest span: 80 feet (24 m)
- No. of spans: Seven
- Piers in water: Six
- Clearance below: 17.5 feet (5.3 m)

History
- Construction start: August 9, 1906
- Construction end: February 17, 1909
- Opened: October 15, 1908

Statistics
- Daily traffic: 16,840 (2016)

The Pelham Bridge is a bascule bridge located in the New York City borough of the Bronx, just downstream of the railroad Pelham Bay Bridge. It carries Shore Road and a walkway along the downstream side, over the Hutchinson River. The bridge is operated and maintained by the New York City Department of Transportation. Crossing the mouth of the river, it is variously called Pelham Bay Bridge and Pelham Bridge. The BL45 to/from Eastchester in Westchester County as well as the Bx29, which operates between City Island and Co-op City, operates over this bridge.

The Pelham Bridge opens for maritime traffic frequently; in 2014, it opened 724 times. The watercraft traffic under that bridge is greater than for any other drawbridge in the city.

== History ==
The first bridge at the site, a stone bridge built in 1815, was destroyed in a storm on April 12, 1816. Another bridge was not built at the site for eighteen years.

The current bridge replaced an older one that required constant, expensive maintenance. The new bridge was opened to traffic on October 15, 1908 before it was fully completed, in order to save costs on maintaining the old bridge. During construction, the water main for City Island and Pelham Bay Park had to be interrupted, so water was imported from New Rochelle, costing the city $5,323.93. The bridge was completed on February 17, 1909. at a total cost of $605,274.06. The bridge was reconstructed in 1985.

A celebration of the bridge's centennial took place on October 28, 2008.
