= Reservoir 3 =

- Location in New York
- Location: New York
- Coordinates: 40°56′46″N 73°48′04″W
- Type: Reservoir
- Surface area: 30 acres (12 ha)
- Water volume: 128×10^{6} US gal (480,000 m^{3})
- Surface elevation: 125 ft (38 m)

Reservoir 3 is a man-made reservoir located in the northern portion of the city of New Rochelle along the New Rochelle - Eastchester boundary in Westchester County, New York. Constructed in 1908, the reservoir is impounded by the New Rochelle "Reservoir 3 dam" on the Hutchinson River. The dam is of earthen construction, with a height of 30 feet (9.1 m) and a length of 450 feet (140 m). It has an area of about 30 acres (12 ha), and a capacity of about 128 million US gallons (480,000 m^{3}). Maximum discharge is 1,815 cubic feet (51.4 m^{3}) per second. Its capacity is 498 acre-feet (614,000 m^{3}). Normal storage is 220 acre-feet (270,000 m^{3}). It drains an area of 2.85 square miles (7.4 km^{2}). The reservoir is currently owned by the Westchester County Department of Parks and Recreation.

This reservoir serves as a storage reservoir for the high-level system, with the overflow from it passing directly to Reservoir 2. The water from this reservoir, and from Reservoir 2, was originally pumped at a pumping station into the mains of the high service system to serve the northern portions of New Rochelle.

The upper end of the reservoir is swampy at the point where the Hutchinson River enters. Just above the upper end of the reservoir and on the east side there is a small feeder which flows into the main river and has its headwaters near the parkway 500 or 600 feet (150 or 180 m) to the east of the main river. About one-half of a mile (0.80 km) above the upper end of the reservoir the Hutchinson River Parkway crosses the river between reservoirs 1 and 3.
