= Interlachen, Florida =

Town in the state of Florida, United States

- Town
- Town of Interlachen
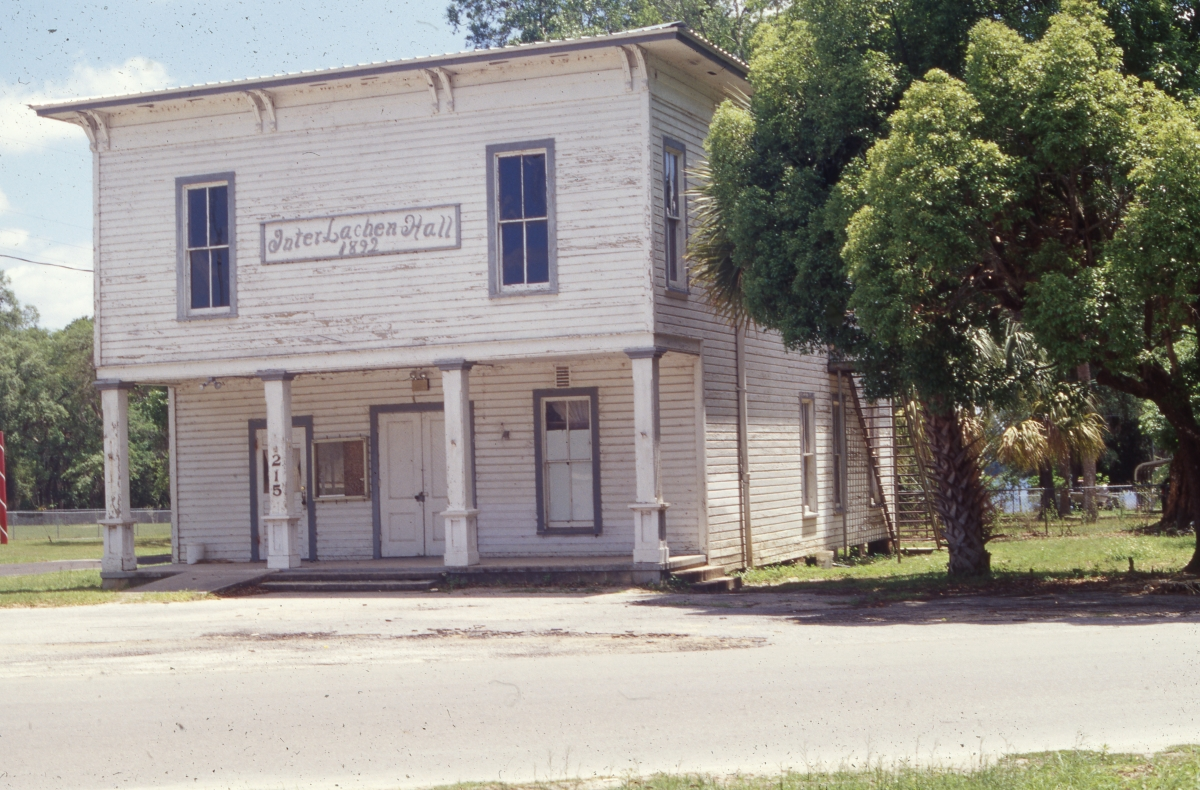
- Interlachen Town Hall in 2018

- Seal
- Motto: "Between the Lakes"
- Location in Putnam County and the state of Florida
- Coordinates: 29°37′32″N 81°53′32″W
- Country: United States
- State: Florida
- County: Putnam
- Settled (Blue Pond): c. Late 1870s
- Incorporated (Town of Interlachen): 1888

Government
  - Type: Mayor-Council
  - Mayor: James "Rick" Hanes
  - Chairperson: Beverly Bakker
  - Council Members: Carolyn Bennett, Carolyn Meadows, Anna Rose Larsen, and Vice Chair; Joni Conner
  - Town Clerk: Joni Payne
  - Town Attorney: George A. Young

Area
  - Total: 6.45 sq mi (16.71 km^{2})
  - Land: 6.10 sq mi (15.80 km^{2})
  - Water: 0.35 sq mi (0.91 km^{2})
- Elevation: 79 ft (24 m)

Population (2020)
  - Total: 1,441
  - Density: 236.2/sq mi (91.21/km^{2})
- Time zone: UTC-5 (Eastern (EST))
  - Summer (DST): UTC-4 (EDT)
- ZIP codes: 32148-32149
- Area code: 386
- FIPS code: 12-33900
- GNIS feature ID: 2405889
- Website: www.interlachen-fl.gov

Interlachen is a town in Putnam County, Florida, United States. It is part of the Palatka, Florida Micropolitan Statistical Area. The population was 1,441 at the 2020 census, up from 1,403 at the 2010 census.

== History ==
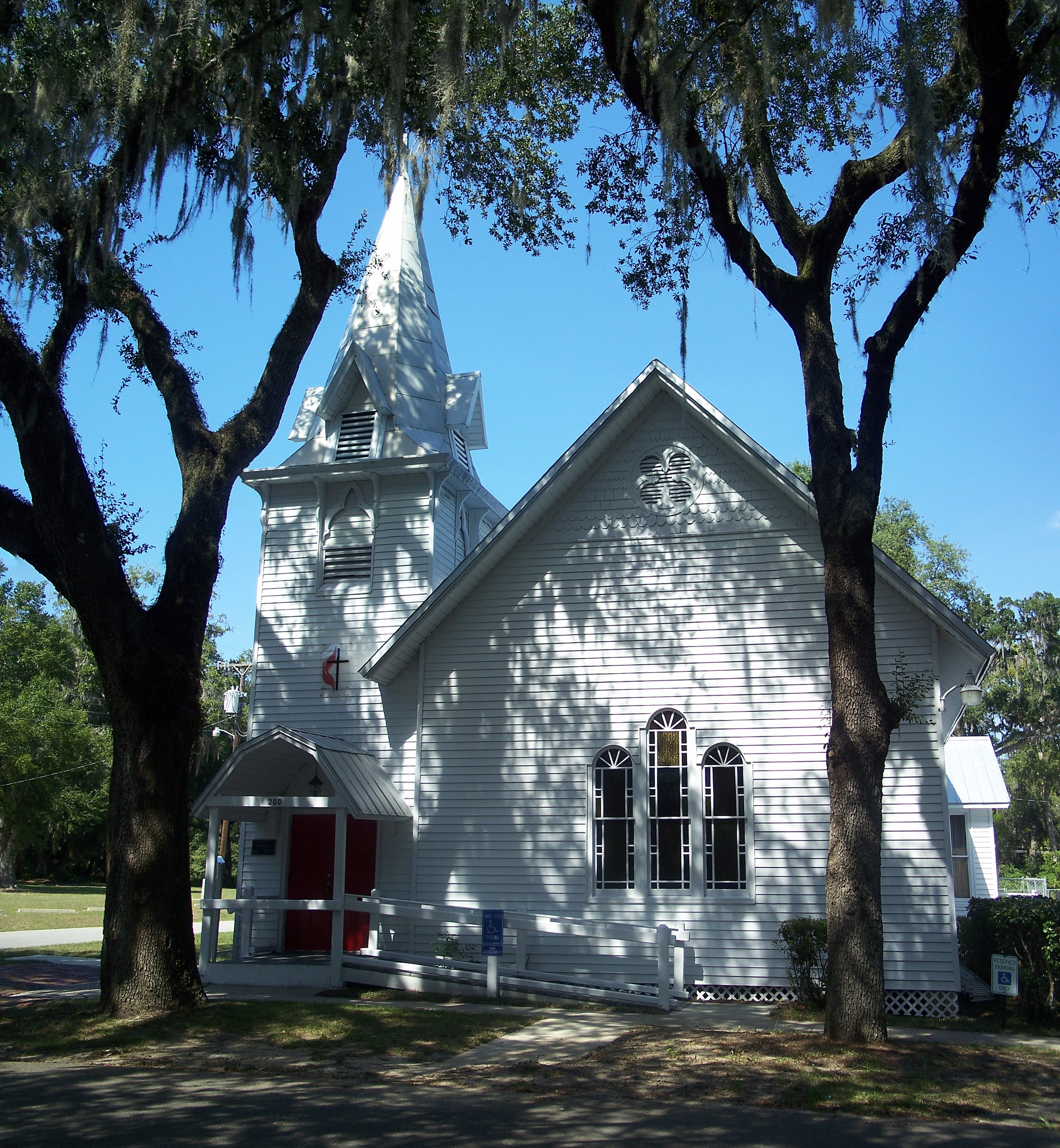
Interlachen United Methodist Church

When the Florida Southern Railway came through in the 1870s, the area opened up to settlers, and the area was known as "Blue Pond". The town developed economically as a winter vacation spot and citrus growing area. The Town of Interlachen was officially incorporated as a municipality in 1888. The Hastings Seed House was organized in 1889, moving to Atlanta, Georgia ten years later. In 1891, the Interlachen Town Hall burned down. Another was built to replace it the following year and it still stands—now housing a museum—and is also used as a place for presentations for certain festivals. When the Great Freeze hit in 1895, the town's tourism and citrus sharply declined. In 1895, Interlachen Academy was built; it is the oldest wooden school house in continuous use in Florida, which now serves as the location of the Interlachen High School's JROTC program.

The town's name came from one Mr. Berkelmann, a resident who had previously lived in Interlachen, Switzerland. He suggested the name not only because of his former hometown, but because the Florida town is located between the two largest lakes (Lake Lagonda and Lake Chipco) in its town limits (of the more than 28 lakes in the town), and "Interlachen", translates to "between the lakes".

In 1926, Interlachen first gained electricity and Route 14, now Florida State Road 20, was constructed through it. In the 1930s, a train came through the town every two hours. But in 1969, with the decline of railroads, the Interlachen Railroad depot was razed. Currently, a caboose sits in the middle of the town as a reminder of the tourist haven the town once was.

== Geography ==
According to the United States Census Bureau, the town has a total area of 6.4 square miles (17 km^{2}), of which 5.8 square miles (15 km^{2}) is land and 0.6 square miles (1.6 km^{2}) (10.08%) is water.

=== Climate ===
The climate in this area is characterized by hot, humid summers and generally mild winters. According to the Köppen climate classification, the Town of Interlachen has a humid subtropical climate zone (Cfa).

== Demographics ==
Historical population
| Census | Pop. | Note | %± |
|---|---|---|---|
| 1890 | 207 | | — |
| 1900 | 147 | | −29.0% |
| 1910 | 263 | | 78.9% |
| 1920 | 177 | | −32.7% |
| 1930 | 235 | | 32.8% |
| 1940 | 251 | | 6.8% |
| 1950 | 297 | | 18.3% |
| 1960 | 349 | | 17.5% |
| 1970 | 478 | | 37.0% |
| 1980 | 848 | | 77.4% |
| 1990 | 1,160 | | 36.8% |
| 2000 | 1,475 | | 27.2% |
| 2010 | 1,403 | | −4.9% |
| 2020 | 1,441 | | 2.7% |
U.S. Decennial Census

=== Racial and ethnic composition ===
Interlachen racial composition (Hispanics excluded from racial categories) (NH = Non-Hispanic)
| Race | Pop 2010 | Pop 2020 | % 2010 | % 2020 |
|---|---|---|---|---|
| White (NH) | 928 | 928 | 66.14% | 64.40% |
| Black or African American (NH) | 92 | 107 | 6.56% | 7.43% |
| Native American or Alaska Native (NH) | 8 | 10 | 0.57% | 0.69% |
| Asian (NH) | 3 | 4 | 0.21% | 0.28% |
| Pacific Islander or Native Hawaiian (NH) | 1 | 2 | 0.07% | 0.14% |
| Some other race (NH) | 0 | 7 | 0.00% | 0.49% |
| Two or more races/Multiracial (NH) | 21 | 45 | 1.50% | 3.12% |
| Hispanic or Latino (any race) | 350 | 338 | 24.95% | 23.46% |
| Total | 1,403 | 1,441 | | |

=== 2020 census ===
As of the 2020 census, Interlachen had a population of 1,441. The median age was 42.5 years. 22.8% of residents were under the age of 18 and 22.1% of residents were 65 years of age or older. For every 100 females there were 93.9 males, and for every 100 females age 18 and over there were 92.2 males age 18 and over.

0.0% of residents lived in urban areas, while 100.0% lived in rural areas.

There were 578 households in Interlachen, of which 33.6% had children under the age of 18 living in them. Of all households, 40.7% were married-couple households, 20.9% were households with a male householder and no spouse or partner present, and 27.7% were households with a female householder and no spouse or partner present. About 25.1% of all households were made up of individuals and 14.1% had someone living alone who was 65 years of age or older.

There were 647 housing units, of which 10.7% were vacant. The homeowner vacancy rate was 1.0% and the rental vacancy rate was 5.6%.

According to 2020 American Community Survey estimates, there were 457 families residing in the town.

=== 2010 census ===
As of the 2010 United States census, there were 1,403 people, 751 households, and 575 families residing in the town.

=== 2000 census ===
As of the census of 2000, there were 1,475 people, 537 households, and 381 families residing in the town. The population density was 254.1 inhabitants per square mile (98.1/km^{2}). There were 616 housing units at an average density of 106.1 per square mile (41.0/km^{2}). The racial makeup of the town was 78.44% White, 6.10% African American, 0.88% Native American, 0.27% Asian, 11.19% from other races, and 3.12% from two or more races. Hispanic or Latino of any race were 21.83% of the population.

In 2000, there were 537 households, out of which 33.9% had children under the age of 18 living with them, 52.7% were married couples living together, 13.8% had a female householder with no husband present, and 28.9% were non-families. 23.8% of all households were made up of individuals, and 11.2% had someone living alone who was 65 years of age or older. The average household size was 2.75 and the average family size was 3.28.

In 2000, in the town, the population was spread out, with 30.9% under the age of 18, 7.5% from 18 to 24, 23.9% from 25 to 44, 22.9% from 45 to 64, and 14.8% who were 65 years of age or older. The median age was 36 years. For every 100 females, there were 93.1 males. For every 100 females age 18 and over, there were 91.5 males.

In 2000, the median income for a household in the town was $25,962, and the median income for a family was $34,375. Males had a median income of $24,886 versus $17,841 for females. The per capita income for the town was $12,920. About 26.9% of families and 27.5% of the population were below the poverty line, including 32.9% of those under age 18 and 18.3% of those age 65 or over.

== Education ==
All of Interlachen's public schools are served by Putnam County School Board.

- Robert H. Jenkins, Jr. Elementary School (formerly known as Interlachen Elementary School until 2021)
- Interlachen Middle/High School (merged with C.H. Price Middle School and reverted back to previous name of Interlachen Jr.-Sr. High School in 2021)

=== Library ===
Putnam County is served by the Putnam County Library System which has five branches, and the local one is Interlachen Library.
