= University of Western States =

University in Portland, Oregon, U.S.

- Former names: Western States Chiropractic College, 1904-2003
- Type: Private university
- Established: 1904
- Accreditation: NWCCU
- President: Nathan Long
- Students: 915
- Location: Portland, Oregon, United States
- Campus: Urban
- Website: www.uws.edu
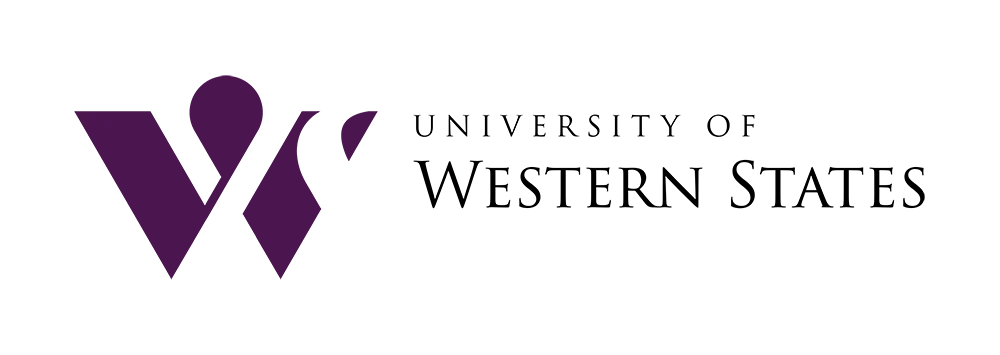

University of Western States is a private health science-focused university in Portland, Oregon. Founded in 1904, UWS is the second oldest chiropractic university in the world. The university has just under 1,000 students enrolled in both online and on campus.

== History ==
University of Western States traces its history to the Marsh School and Cure, founded in 1904 by John and Eva Marsh. In 1967 the name became Western States Chiropractic College. In 1973, Western States relocated to its current 22-acre (8.9 ha) campus in Northeast Portland. The institution name changed again to University of Western States in 2010. Western States added a new $4 million lecture hall in 2001, and a $3.6 million anatomy laboratory in 2011. The anatomy lab took first place for its category in the TopProjects contest held by the Daily Journal of Commerce.

In 2023, University of Western States joined The Community Solution Education System, an integrated nonprofit system of colleges and universities.

== Academics ==
UWS offers a four-year Doctor of Chiropractic (DC) degree program that is the second-oldest in the world. The program is a 12 academic-quarter, first-professional doctoral degree offered on campus in Portland, Oregon. Other master's and graduate certificate programs include: Sports Medicine, Clinical Nutrition and Functional Medicine, Sport and Performance Psychology (SPP), and Clinical Mental Health Counseling (CMHC). A doctor of education (EdD) in Sport and Performance Psychology, as well as a Doctor of Naturopathic Medicine, is also offered.

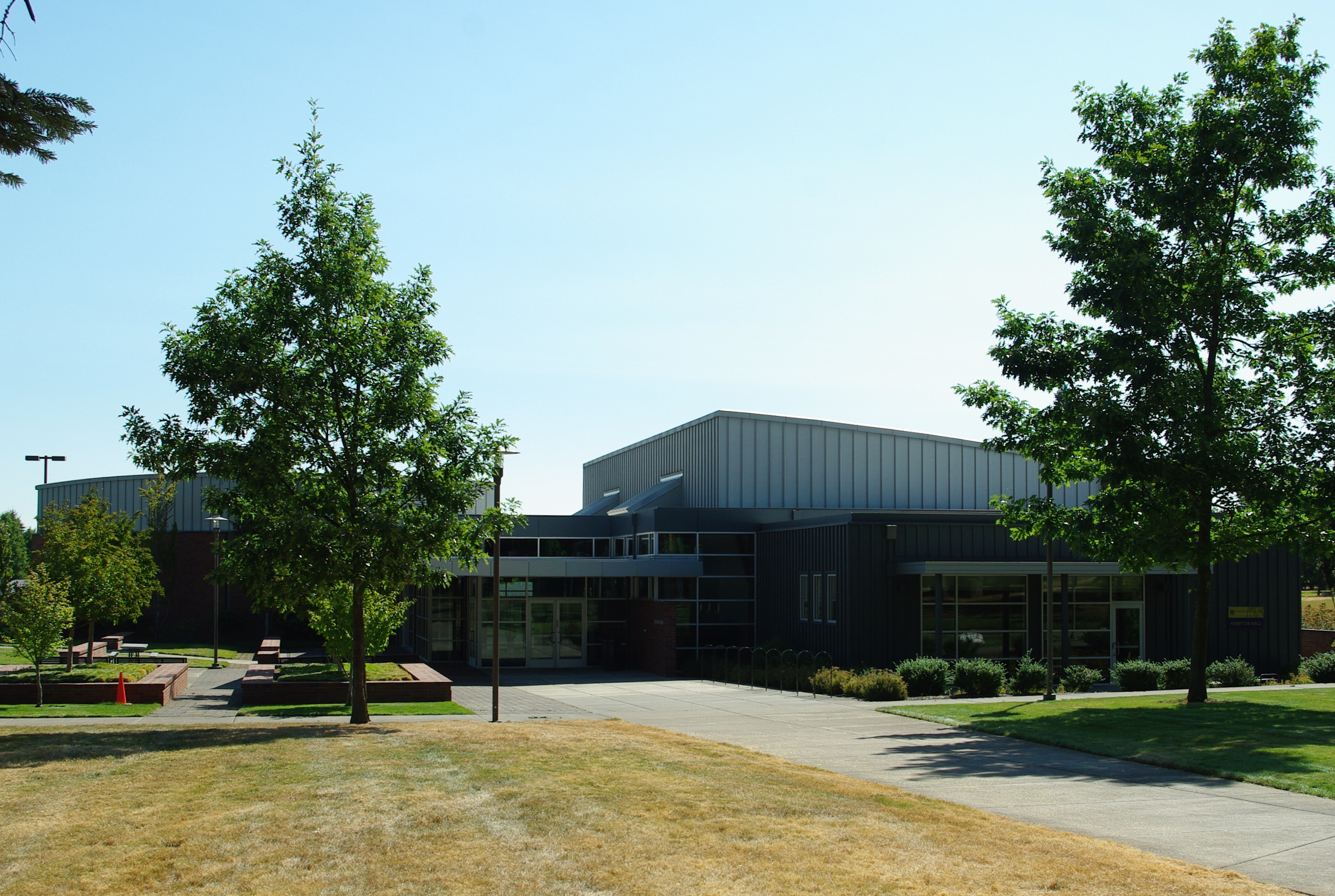
Hampton Hall

In 2015, UWS launched the Connected Whole Health Clinic at University of Western States to help educate students on providing chiropractic and naturopathic care.

== Accreditation ==
University of Western States is accredited by the Northwest Commission on Colleges and Universities. The Doctor of Chiropractic degree program at University of Western States is accredited by the Council on Chiropractic Education (CCE). The Doctor of Naturopathic Medicine Program was approved by The Council of Naturopathic Medical Education (CNME). The Masters in Clinical Mental Health Counseling degree program is accredited by the Masters in Psychology and Counseling Accreditation Council (MPCAC) for the period of March, 2025 through March, 2033. The Oregon Office of Degree Authorization approves University of Western States to award degrees.

== Notable alumni ==
- Shem-Tov Sabag (born 1959), Olympic marathoner, chiropractor
