= List of University of Oregon Olympians =

This article provides a list of Olympic athletes from the University of Oregon. The athletes listed have both competed in either the Summer Olympic Games or the Winter Olympic Games and have attended the University of Oregon. The vast majority of Olympic athletes from Oregon competed in the Oregon Ducks track and field team.

== Summer Olympics ==
Name	Country	Olympiad	Gender	Sport	Event	Finish	Notes	Ref
Richard Abrahamson	United States	1972 Munich	Men's	Team handball		14th		
Richard Abrahamson	United States	1976 Montreal	Men's	Team handball		10th		
Kyle Alcorn	United States	2012 London	Men's	Track and field	3000 metres steeplechase			
Devon Allen	United States	2016 Rio de Janeiro	Men's	Track and field	110 metres hurdles	5th		
Devon Allen	United States	2020 Tokyo	Men's	Track and field	110 metres hurdles	4th		
Lee Allen	United States	1956 Melbourne	Men's	Wrestling	Freestyle			
Lee Allen	United States	1960 Rome	Men's	Wrestling	Greco-Roman	8th		
Grace Bakari	Ghana	1984 Los Angeles	Women's	Track and field	4 × 400 relay			
Keshia Baker	United States	2012 London	Women's	Track and field	4 × 400 relay	Gold	semis	
Jim Bailey	Australia	1956 Melbourne	Men's	Track and field	800 metres			
William Bartlett	United States	1920 Antwerp	Men's	Track and field	Discus	5th		
Wade Bell	United States	1968 Mexico City	Men's	Track and field	800 metres			
Paula Berry	United States	1992 Barcelona	Women's	Track and field	Javelin			
Craig Blackman	Canada	1972 Munich	Men's	Track and field	4 × 400 relay			
Kelly Blair	United States	1996 Atlanta	Women's	Track and field	Heptathlon	8th		
Tom Blankenburg	United States	1928 Amsterdam	Men's	Swimming	200 metres breaststroke	9th		
Art Boileau	Canada	1984 Los Angeles	Men's	Track and field	Marathon			
Dacre Bowen	Canada	1976 Montreal	Men's	Track and field	4 × 100 relay	8th		
Chris Braithwaite	(Trinidad and Tobago) Trinidad	1976 Montreal	Men's	Track and field	4 × 100 relay			
Chris Braithwaite	(Trinidad and Tobago) Trinidad	1980 Moscow	Men's	Track and field	100 metres			
Chris Braithwaite	(Trinidad and Tobago) Trinidad	1980 Moscow	Men's	Track and field	200 metres			
Chris Braithwaite	(Trinidad and Tobago) Trinidad	1980 Moscow	Men's	Track and field	4 × 100 relay			
Dillon Brooks	Canada	2024 Paris	Men's	Basketball	5x5	5th		
Piotr Buciarski	Denmark	2004 Athens	Men's	Track and field	Pole vault			
Zoe Buckman	Australia	2012 London	Women's	Track and field	1500 metres			
Zoe Buckman	Australia	2016 Rio de Janeiro	Women's	Track and field	1500 metres			
Dyrol Burleson	United States	1960 Rome	Men's	Track and field	1500 metres	6th		
Dyrol Burleson	United States	1964 Tokyo	Men's	Track and field	1500 metres	5th		
Johnathan Cabral	Canada	2016 Rio de Janeiro	Men's	Track and field	110 metres hurdles	6th		
Maite Cazorla	Spain	2020 Tokyo	Women's	Basketball	5x5	6th		
Maite Cazorla	Spain	2024 Paris	Women's	Basketball	5x5	5th		
Matt Centrowitz	United States	1976 Montreal	Men's	Track and field	1500 metres			
Matthew Centrowitz Jr.	United States	2012 London	Men's	Track and field	1500 metres	4th		
Matthew Centrowitz Jr.	United States	2016 Rio de Janeiro	Men's	Track and field	1500 metres	Gold		
Matthew Centrowitz Jr.	United States	2020 Tokyo	Men's	Track and field	1500 metres	semis		
Doug Chapman	Canada	1972 Munich	Men's	Track and field	4 × 400 relay			
Pedro Chiamulera	Brazil	1992 Barcelona	Men's	Track and field	400 metres hurdles	DNF		
Ranza Clark	Canada	1984 Los Angeles	Women's	Track and field	800 metres	semis		
Wyndham Clark	United States	2024 Paris	Men's	Golf	Individual stroke	T-14		
Don Clary	United States	1984 Los Angeles	Men's	Track and field	5000 metres			
Doug Clement	Canada	1952 Helsinki	Men's	Track and field	400 metres		semis	
Doug Clement	Canada	1952 Helsinki	Men's	Track and field	4 × 400 relay	4th		
Micaela Cocks	New Zealand	2008 Beijing	Women's	Basketball				
Brian Crouser	United States	1988 Seoul	Men's	Track and field	Javelin			
Brian Crouser	United States	1992 Barcelona	Men's	Track and field	Javelin			
Sam Crouser	United States	2016 Rio de Janeiro	Men's	Track and field	Javelin	34th		
Joaquim Cruz	Brazil	1984 Los Angeles	Men's	Track and field	800 metres	Gold		
Joaquim Cruz	Brazil	1988 Seoul	Men's	Track and field	800 metres	Silver		
Joaquim Cruz	Brazil	1996 Atlanta	Men's	Track and field	1500 metres			
Pedro da Silva	Brazil	1992 Barcelona	Men's	Track and field	Decathlon	DNF		
Otis Davis	United States	1960 Rome	Men's	Track and field	400 metres	Gold	WR	
Otis Davis	United States	1960 Rome	Men's	Track and field	4 × 400 relay	Gold	WR	
Bill Dellinger	United States	1960 Rome	Men's	Track and field	5000 metres			
Bill Dellinger	United States	1964 Tokyo	Men's	Track and field	5000 metres	Bronze		
Al Dukowski	Canada	1976 Montreal	Men's	Track and field	4 × 100 relay	8th		
Ashton Eaton	United States	2012 London	Men's	Track and field	Decathlon	Gold		
Ashton Eaton	United States	2016 Rio de Janeiro	Men's	Track and field	Decathlon	Gold	OR-t	
Dave Edstrom	United States	1960 Rome	Men's	Track and field	Decathlon			
Susan Ejore	Kenya	2024 Paris	Women's	Track and field	1500 metres	6th		
Ken Flax	United States	1988 Seoul	Men's	Track and field	Hammer			
Ken Flax	United States	1992 Barcelona	Men's	Track and field	Hammer			
Peter Fonseca	Canada	1996 Atlanta	Men's	Track and field	Marathon	21st		
Phyllis Francis	United States	2016 Rio de Janeiro	Women's	Track and field	400 metres			
Phyllis Francis	United States	2016 Rio de Janeiro	Women's	Track and field	4 × 400 relay	Gold		
Joanna Gail	Greece	2004 Athens	Women's	Softball		7th		
English Gardner	United States	2016 Rio de Janeiro	Women's	Track and field	100 metres			
English Gardner	United States	2016 Rio de Janeiro	Women's	Track and field	4 × 100 relay	Gold		
English Gardner	United States	2020 Tokyo	Women's	Track and field	4 × 100 relay	Silver		
Paul Geis	United States	1976 Montreal	Men's	Track and field	5000 metres	12th		
Greg Gibson	United States	1984 Los Angeles	Men's	Wrestling		Silver		
Cravon Gillespie	United States	2020 Tokyo	Men's	Track and field	4 × 100 relay	semis		
Shana Grebo	France	2024 Paris	Women's	Track and field	400 metres hurdles	semis		
Shana Grebo	France	2024 Paris	Women's	Track and field	4 × 400 metres relay	5th		
Jim Grelle	United States	1960 Rome	Men's	Track and field	1500 metres	9th		
Martin Hawkins	United States	1912 Stockholm	Men's	Track and field	High hurdles	Bronze		
Bill Heikkila	Canada	1968 Mexico City	Men's	Track and field	Javelin			
Ralph Hill	United States	1932 Los Angeles	Men's	Track and field	5000 metres	Silver		
Tom Hintnaus	Brazil	1984 Los Angeles	Men's	Track and field	Pole vault			
Cole Hocker	United States	2020 Tokyo	Men's	Track and field	1500 metres	6th		
Cole Hocker	United States	2024 Paris	Men's	Track and field	1500 metres	Gold	OR	
Nikki Hiltz	United States	2024 Paris	Women's	Track and field	1500 metres	7th		
Becky Holliday	United States	2012 London	Women's	Track and field	Pole vault	9th		
Cyrus Hostetler	United States	2012 London	Men's	Track and field	Javelin			
Cyrus Hostetler	United States	2016 Rio de Janeiro	Men's	Track and field	Javelin	20th		
Jessica Hull	Australia	2020 Tokyo	Women's	Track and field	1500 metres	11th		
Jessica Hull	Australia	2024 Paris	Women's	Track and field	1500 metres	Silver		
Charlie Hunter	Australia	2020 Tokyo	Men's	Track and field	800 metres	semis		
Jack Hutchins	Canada	1948 London	Men's	Track and field	800 metres			
Jack Hutchins	Canada	1948 London	Men's	Track and field	1500 metres			
Jack Hutchins	Canada	1952 Helsinki	Men's	Track and field	800 metres			
Jack Hutchins	Canada	1952 Helsinki	Men's	Track and field	4 × 400 relay	4th		
Emanuel Ihemeje	Italy	2020 Tokyo	Men's	Track and field	Triple jump	11th		
Emanuel Ihemeje	Italy	2024 Paris	Men's	Track and field	Triple jump	qual		
Sabrina Ionescu	United States	2024 Paris	Women's	Basketball	5x5	Gold		
Harry Jerome	Canada	1960 Rome	Men's	Track and field	100 metres			
Harry Jerome	Canada	1964 Tokyo	Men's	Track and field	100 metres	Bronze		
Harry Jerome	Canada	1964 Tokyo	Men's	Track and field	200 metres	4th		
Harry Jerome	Canada	1968 Mexico City	Men's	Track and field	100 metres	7th		
Alaysha Johnson	United States	2024 Paris	Women's	Track and field	100 metres hurdles	7th		
Lars Kaupang	Norway	1976 Montreal	Men's	Track and field	1500 metres			
Arsalan Kazemi	Iran	2020 Tokyo	Men's	Basketball		12th		
Klaudia Kazimierska	Poland	2024 Paris	Women's	Track and field	1500 metres	10th		
Dan Kelly	United States	1908 London	Men's	Track and field	Broad jump	Silver		
Karl Keska	(United Kingdom) Great Britain	2000 Sydney	Men's	Track and field	10,000 metres	8th		
Koitatoi Kidali	Kenya	2024 Paris	Men's	Track and field	800 metres	heats		
Kyree King	United States	2024 Paris	Men's	Track and field	4 × 100 metres relay	DQ		
Trish King	United States	1988 Seoul	Women's	Track and field	High jump			
Jorinde van Klinken	Netherlands	2024 Paris	Women's	Track and field	Discus	7th		
Jorinde van Klinken	Netherlands	2024 Paris	Women's	Track and field	Shot put	qual		
Gary Knoke	Australia	1964 Tokyo	Men's	Track and field	400 metres hurdles	4th		
Gary Knoke	Australia	1968 Mexico City	Men's	Track and field	110 metre hurdles			
Gary Knoke	Australia	1968 Mexico City	Men's	Track and field	400 metre hurdles			
Gary Knoke	Australia	1972 Munich	Men's	Track and field	400 metre hurdles			
Aneta Konieczek	Poland	2020 Tokyo	Women's	Track and field	3000 metres steeplechase	round 1		
Aneta Konieczek	Poland	2024 Paris	Women's	Track and field	3000 metres steeplechase	heats		
Arne Kvalheim	Norway	1968 Mexico City	Men's	Track and field	1500 metres			
Knut Kvalheim	Norway	1976 Montreal	Men's	Track and field	5000 metres			
Danny Lopez	United States	1992 Barcelona	Men's	Track and field	3000 metres steeplechase	semis		
Reidar Lorentzen	Norway	1984 Los Angeles	Men's	Track and field	Javelin			
Santiago Lorenzo	Argentina	2004 Athens	Men's	Track and field	Decathlon	24th		
Bob Martin	Canada	1972 Munich	Men's	Track and field	4 × 400 relay			
Bob Martin	Canada	1976 Montreal	Men's	Track and field	4 × 100 relay	8th	alt	
Lisa Martin	Australia	1984 Los Angeles	Women's	Track and field	Marathon	7th		
Lisa Martin	Australia	1988 Seoul	Women's	Track and field	Marathon	Silver		
Lisa Martin	Australia	1992 Barcelona	Women's	Track and field	Marathon	DNF		
Walter McClure	United States	1912 Stockholm	Men's	Track and field	800 metres			
Scott McGough	United States	2020 Tokyo	Men's	Baseball		Silver		
Elisa Mevius	Germany	2024 Paris	Women's	Basketball	3x3	Gold		
Claire Michel	Belgium	2016 Rio de Janeiro	Women's	Triathlon		DNF		
Claire Michel	Belgium	2020 Tokyo	Women's	Triathlon		34th		
Claire Michel	Belgium	2020 Tokyo	Women's	Triathlon mixed relay		5th		
Claire Michel	Belgium	2024 Paris	Women's	Triathlon		38th		
Kenny Moore	United States	1968 Mexico City	Men's	Track and field	Marathon	14th		
Kenny Moore	United States	1972 Munich	Men's	Track and field	Marathon	4th		
Gerry Moro	Canada	1964 Tokyo	Men's	Track and field	Pole vault	10th		
Gerry Moro	Canada	1972 Munich	Men's	Track and field	Decathlon			
Yohanan Moyal	Israel	1984 Los Angeles	Men's	Gymnastics	All around			
Kemba Nelson	Jamaica	2024 Paris	Women's	Track and field	4 × 100 metres relay	5th		
Ani Nyhus	Canada	2004 Athens	Women's	Softball		5th		
Cathy O'Brien	United States	1988 Seoul	Women's	Track and field	Marathon			
Cathy O'Brien	United States	1992 Barcelona	Women's	Track and field	Marathon	9th		
Chamberlain Oguchi	Nigeria	2012 London	Men's	Basketball				
Chamberlain Oguchi	Nigeria	2016 Rio de Janeiro	Men's	Basketball				
Yoriko Okamoto	Japan	2000 Sydney	Women's	Taekwondo	Welterweight	Bronze		
Yoriko Okamoto	Japan	2004 Athens	Women's	Taekwondo	Heavyweight	7-t		
Yoriko Okamoto	Japan	2008 Beijing	Women's	Taekwondo	Welterweight	11-t		
Sig Ohlemann	Canada	1960 Rome	Men's	Track and field	800 metres			
Alexi Pappas	Greece	2016 Rio de Janeiro	Women's	Track and field	10,000 metres	17th		
Annette Peters	United States	1992 Barcelona	Women's	Track and field	3000 metres		semis	
Jenna Prandini	United States	2016 Rio de Janeiro	Women's	Track and field	200 metres			
Jenna Prandini	United States	2016 Rio de Janeiro	Women's	Track and field	4 × 100 relay	DNP		
Jenna Prandini	United States	2020 Tokyo	Women's	Track and field	100 metres	semis		
Jenna Prandini	United States	2020 Tokyo	Women's	Track and field	200 metres	13th		
Jenna Prandini	United States	2020 Tokyo	Women's	Track and field	4 × 100 relay	Silver		
Steve Prefontaine	United States	1972 Munich	Men's	Track and field	5000 metres	4th		
Mack Robinson	United States	1936 Berlin	Men's	Track and field	200 metres	Silver		
Nick Rogers	United States	2000 Sydney	Men's	Track and field	5000 metres		semis	
Raevyn Rogers	United States	2020 Tokyo	Women's	Track and field	800 metres	Bronze		
Jaida Ross	United States	2024 Paris	Women's	Track and field	Shot put	4th		
Galen Rupp	United States	2008 Beijing	Men's	Track and field	10,000 metres	13th		
Galen Rupp	United States	2012 London	Men's	Track and field	5000 metres	7th		
Galen Rupp	United States	2012 London	Men's	Track and field	10,000 metres	Silver		
Galen Rupp	United States	2016 Rio de Janeiro	Men's	Track and field	10,000 metres	5th		
Galen Rupp	United States	2016 Rio de Janeiro	Men's	Track and field	Marathon	Bronze		
Galen Rupp	United States	2020 Tokyo	Men's	Track and field	Marathon	8th		
Shemi Sabag	Israel	1984 Los Angeles	Men's	Track and field	Marathon			
Nyara Sabally	Germany	2024 Paris	Women's	Basketball	5x5	7th		
Satou Sabally	Germany	2024 Paris	Women's	Basketball	5x5	7th		
Alberto Salazar	United States	1984 Los Angeles	Men's	Track and field	Marathon			
Steve Savage	United States	1972 Munich	Men's	Track and field	3000 metres steeplechase	7th		
Pete Shmock	United States	1976 Montreal	Men's	Track and field	Shot put	9th		
Ralph Spearow	United States	1924 Paris	Men's	Track and field	Pole vault	6th		
Peter Spir	Canada	1976 Montreal	Men's	Track and field	1500 metres			
Deajah Stevens	United States	2016 Rio de Janeiro	Women's	Track and field	200 metres	7th		
Paul Sunderland	United States	1984 Los Angeles	Men's	Volleyball		Gold		
Lynda Sutfin	United States	1984 Los Angeles	Women's	Track and field	Javelin			
Lynda Sutfin	United States	1988 Seoul	Women's	Track and field	Javelin			
Janie Takeda	United States	2020 Tokyo	Women's	Softball		Silver		
Kory Tarpenning	United States	1988 Seoul	Men's	Track and field	Pole vault			
Kory Tarpenning	United States	1992 Barcelona	Men's	Track and field	Pole vault	4th		
Zack Test	United States	2016 Rio de Janeiro	Men's	Rugby		9th		
Brianne Theisen-Eaton	Canada	2012 London	Women's	Track and field	Heptathlon	11th		
Brianne Theisen-Eaton	Canada	2016 Rio de Janeiro	Women's	Track and field	Heptathlon	Bronze		
Les Tipton	United States	1964 Tokyo	Men's	Track and field	Javelin			
Norm Trerise	Canada	1968 Mexico City	Men's	Track and field	1500 metres			
Carlos Trujillo	Guatemala	2016 Rio de Janeiro	Men's	Track and field	Marathon	67th		
Art Tuck	United States	1920 Antwerp	Men's	Track and field	Javelin	DNP		
Ariana Washington	United States	2016 Rio de Janeiro	Women's	Track and field	4 × 100 relay	DNP		
Jillian Weir	Canada	2020 Tokyo	Women's	Track and field	Hammer throw	qual		
Andrew Wheating	United States	2008 Beijing	Men's	Track and field	800 metres			
Andrew Wheating	United States	2012 London	Men's	Track and field	800 metres			
Mac Wilkins	United States	1976 Montreal	Men's	Track and field	Discus	Gold		
Mac Wilkins	United States	1984 Los Angeles	Men's	Track and field	Discus	Silver		
Mac Wilkins	United States	1988 Seoul	Men's	Track and field	Discus	5th		
Micah Williams	United States	2020 Tokyo	Men's	Track and field	4 × 100 relay	DNP		
Shaun Williams	South Africa	2004 Athens	Men's	Wrestling	Freestyle			
Lynne Winbigler	United States	1976 Montreal	Women's	Track and field	Discus		semis	
Chris Winter	Canada	2016 Rio de Janeiro	Men's	Track and field	3000 metres steeplechase			
Don Wright	Australia	1984 Los Angeles	Men's	Track and field	110 metre hurdles		semis	
Carolyn Wood	United States	1960 Rome	Women's	Swimming	4 × 100 freestyle	Gold		
Carolyn Wood	United States	1960 Rome	Women's	Swimming	4 × 100 medley	Gold	semis	
Rachel Yurkovich	United States	2012 London	Women's	Track and field	Javelin			
Alessia Zarbo	France	2024 Paris	Women's	Track and field	10,000 metres	DNF		

== Winter Olympics ==
Name	Country	Year	Gender	Sport	Event	Finish	Notes	Ref
Kiki Cutter	United States	1968 Grenoble	Women's	Alpine skiing	Downhill	17th		
Kiki Cutter	United States	1968 Grenoble	Women's	Alpine skiing	Giant slalom	21st		
Kiki Cutter	United States	1968 Grenoble	Women's	Alpine skiing	Slalom	DNF		
Laurenne Ross	United States	2014 Sochi	Women's	Alpine skiing	Super combined	DNF		
Laurenne Ross	United States	2018 Pyeongchang	Women's	Alpine skiing	Super-G	15th		
