= List of Texas Tech University Olympians =

This list of Texas Tech University Olympians includes athletes, coaches, and faculty associated with Texas Tech University who have competed in the Olympic Games. Athletes from the Summer and Winter Olympic Games are included in the list.

Olympic appearances and medals by sport
| Sport | Appearances | 1st place, gold medalist(s) | 2nd place, silver medalist(s) | 3rd place, bronze medalist(s) | Total |
| Athletics | 56 | 3 | 6 | 1 | 10 |
| Basketball | 4 | 4 | 0 | 0 | 4 |
| Figure skating | 2 | 0 | 1 | 0 | 1 |
| Football | 6 | 1 | 0 | 1 | 2 |
| Golf | 5 | 0 | 0 | 0 | 0 |
| Handball | 2 | 0 | 0 | 0 | 0 |
| Rowing | 1 | 0 | 0 | 0 | 0 |
| Short-track speed skating | 5 | 0 | 1 | 1 | 2 |
| Total | 81 | 8 | 8 | 3 | 19 |

== Olympians ==
=== Athletes ===
| Games | Athlete | Country | Sport | Event | Medal | Ref. |
|---|---|---|---|---|---|---|
| 1992 Barcelona | Sharon Cain | United States | Handball | Women's tournament | | |
| 1996 Atlanta | Sharon Cain | United States | Handball | Women's tournament | | |
| 1996 Atlanta | Sheryl Swoopes | United States | Basketball | Women's tournament | 1st place, gold medalist(s) | |
| 2000 Sydney | Julieon Raeburn | Trinidad and Tobago | Athletics | Men's 200 m | | |
| 2000 Sydney | Julieon Raeburn | Trinidad and Tobago | Athletics | Men's 4 x 100 m relay | | |
| 2000 Sydney | Sheryl Swoopes | United States | Basketball | Women's tournament | 1st place, gold medalist(s) | |
| 2004 Athens | Andrae Williams | (The Bahamas) Bahamas | Athletics | Men's 4 x 400 m relay | | |
| 2004 Athens | Jonathan Johnson | United States | Athletics | Men's 800 m | | |
| 2004 Athens | Sheryl Swoopes | United States | Basketball | Women's tournament | 1st place, gold medalist(s) | |
| 2008 Beijing | Michael Mathieu | (The Bahamas) Bahamas | Athletics | Men's 400 m | | |
| 2008 Beijing | Michael Mathieu | (The Bahamas) Bahamas | Athletics | Men's 4 x 400 m relay | 2nd place, silver medalist(s) | |
| 2008 Beijing | Andrae Williams | (The Bahamas) Bahamas | Athletics | Men's 4 x 400 m relay | 2nd place, silver medalist(s) | |
| 2008 Beijing | Shereefa Lloyd | Jamaica | Athletics | Women's 4 x 400 m relay | 2nd place, silver medalist(s) | |
| 2008 Beijing | Blessing Okagbare | Nigeria | Athletics | Women's long jump | 2nd place, silver medalist(s) | |
| 2010 Vancouver | Jordan Malone | United States | Short-track speed skating | Men's 1,500 m | | |
| 2010 Vancouver | Jordan Malone | United States | Short-track speed skating | Men's 5,000 m relay | 3rd place, bronze medalist(s) | |
| 2010 Vancouver | Jordan Malone | United States | Short-track speed skating | Men's 500 m | | |
| 2012 London | Julian Wruck | Australia | Athletics | Men's discus throw | | |
| 2012 London | Trevorvano Mackey | (The Bahamas) Bahamas | Athletics | Men's 200 m | | |
| 2012 London | Michael Mathieu | (The Bahamas) Bahamas | Athletics | Men's 200 m | | |
| 2012 London | Michael Mathieu | (The Bahamas) Bahamas | Athletics | Men's 4 x 400 m relay | 1st place, gold medalist(s) | |
| 2012 London | Shane Brathwaite | Barbados | Athletics | Men's 110 m hurdles | | |
| 2012 London | Shereefa Lloyd | Jamaica | Athletics | Women's 4 x 400 m relay | 2nd place, silver medalist(s) | |
| 2012 London | Sally Kipyego | Kenya | Athletics | Women's 10,000 m | 2nd place, silver medalist(s) | |
| 2012 London | Sally Kipyego | Kenya | Athletics | Women's 5,000 m | | |
| 2012 London | Blessing Okagbare | Nigeria | Athletics | Women's 100 m | | |
| 2012 London | Blessing Okagbare | Nigeria | Athletics | Women's 4 x 100 m relay | | |
| 2012 London | Blessing Okagbare | Nigeria | Athletics | Women's long jump | | |
| 2012 London | Jamele Mason | Puerto Rico | Athletics | Men's 400 m hurdles | | |
| 2012 London | Jason Young | United States | Athletics | Men's discus throw | | |
| 2014 Sochi | Jordan Malone | United States | Short-track speed skating | Men's 5,000 m relay | 2nd place, silver medalist(s) | |
| 2014 Sochi | Jordan Malone | United States | Short-track speed skating | Men's 500 m | | |
| 2016 Rio de Janeiro | Michael Mathieu | (The Bahamas) Bahamas | Athletics | Men's 4 x 400 m relay | 3rd place, bronze medalist(s) | |
| 2016 Rio de Janeiro | Blessing Okagbare | Nigeria | Athletics | Women's 100 m | | |
| 2016 Rio de Janeiro | Blessing Okagbare | Nigeria | Athletics | Women's 200 m | | |
| 2016 Rio de Janeiro | Blessing Okagbare | Nigeria | Athletics | Women's 4 x 100 m relay | | |
| 2016 Rio de Janeiro | Bradley Adkins | United States | Athletics | Men's high jump | | |
| 2016 Rio de Janeiro | Gil Roberts | United States | Athletics | Men's 4 x 400 m relay | 1st place, gold medalist(s) | |
| 2016 Rio de Janeiro | Gil Roberts | United States | Athletics | Men's 400 m | | |
| 2016 Rio de Janeiro | Janine Beckie | Canada | Football | Women's tournament | 3rd place, bronze medalist(s) | |
| 2016 Rio de Janeiro | Victoria Esson | New Zealand | Football | Women's tournament | | |
| 2020 Tokyo | Shane Brathwaite | Barbados | Athletics | Men's 110 m hurdles | | |
| 2020 Tokyo | Karayme Bartley | Jamaica | Athletics | Mixed 4 x 400 m relay | | |
| 2020 Tokyo | Karayme Bartley | Jamaica | Athletics | Men's 4 x 400 m relay | | |
| 2020 Tokyo | Rosemary Chukwuma | Nigeria | Athletics | Women's 100 m | | |
| 2020 Tokyo | Rosemary Chukwuma | Nigeria | Athletics | Women's 4 x 100 m relay | | |
| 2020 Tokyo | Divine Oduduru | Nigeria | Athletics | Men's 100 m | | |
| 2020 Tokyo | Divine Oduduru | Nigeria | Athletics | Men's 200 m | | |
| 2020 Tokyo | Blessing Okagbare | Nigeria | Athletics | Women's 100 m | | |
| 2020 Tokyo | Blessing Okagbare | Nigeria | Athletics | Women's 200 m | | |
| 2020 Tokyo | Blessing Okagbare | Nigeria | Athletics | Women's 4 x 100 m relay | | |
| 2020 Tokyo | Ruth Usoro | Nigeria | Athletics | Women's long jump | | |
| 2020 Tokyo | Ruth Usoro | Nigeria | Athletics | Women's triple jump | | |
| 2020 Tokyo | Benard Keter | United States | Athletics | Men's 3000 m steeplechase | | |
| 2020 Tokyo | Sally Kipyego | United States | Athletics | Women's marathon | | |
| 2020 Tokyo | Janine Beckie | Canada | Football | Women's tournament | 1st place, gold medalist(s) | |
| 2020 Tokyo | Victoria Esson | New Zealand | Football | Women's tournament | | |
| 2020 Tokyo | Mito Pereira | Chile | Golf | Men's individual | | |
| 2020 Tokyo | Hurly Long | Germany | Golf | Men's individual | | |
| 2022 Beijing | Ashley Cain | United States | Figure skating | Pair skating | | |
| 2022 Beijing | Ashley Cain | United States | Figure skating | Team event | 2nd place, silver medalist(s) | |
| 2024 Paris | Antoine Andrews | (The Bahamas) Bahamas | Athletics | Men's 110 m hurdles | | |
| 2024 Paris | Terrence Jones | (The Bahamas) Bahamas | Athletics | Men's 100 m | | |
| 2024 Paris | Andrew Hudson | Jamaica | Athletics | Men's 200 m | | |
| 2024 Paris | Rūta Kate Lasmane | Latvia | Athletics | Women's triple jump | | |
| 2024 Paris | Temitope Adeshina | Nigeria | Athletics | Women's high jump | | |
| 2024 Paris | Rosemary Chukwuma | Nigeria | Athletics | Women's 100 m | | |
| 2024 Paris | Ruth Usoro | Nigeria | Athletics | Women's long jump | | |
| 2024 Paris | Oskar Edlund | Sweden | Athletics | Men's 400 m hurdles | | |
| 2024 Paris | Alaysha Johnson | United States | Athletics | Women's 100 m hurdles | | |
| 2024 Paris | Courtney Lindsey | United States | Athletics | Men's 4 × 100 m relay | | |
| 2024 Paris | Monae' Nichols | United States | Athletics | Women's long jump | | |
| 2024 Paris | Janine Beckie | Canada | Football | Women's tournament | | |
| 2024 Paris | Victoria Esson | New Zealand | Football | Women's tournament | | |
| 2024 Paris | Mito Pereira | Chile | Golf | Men's individual | | |
| 2024 Paris | Shannon Tan | Singapore | Golf | Women's individual | | |
| 2024 Paris | Ludvig Åberg | Sweden | Golf | Men's individual | | |

=== Coaches ===
| Games | Athlete | Country | Sport | Event | Medal | Ref. |
|---|---|---|---|---|---|---|
| 1968 Mexico City | Jarvis Scott | United States | Athletics | Women's 400 m | | |
| 1984 Los Angeles | Louise Ritter | United States | Athletics | Women's high jump | | |
| 1984 Los Angeles | Bob Knight | United States | Basketball | Men's tournament (coach) | 1st place, gold medalist(s) | |
| 1988 Seoul | Louise Ritter | United States | Athletics | Women's high jump | 1st place, gold medalist(s) | |

=== Faculty ===
| Games | Athlete | Country | Sport | Event | Medal | Ref. |
|---|---|---|---|---|---|---|
| 1968 Mexico City | Arthur Evans | United States | Rowing | Men's eight | | |

== Paralympians ==
| Games | Athlete | Country | Sport | Event | Medal | Ref. |
|---|---|---|---|---|---|---|
| 1992 Barcelona | Ross Davis | United States | Athletics | Men's 100 m C3–4 | 2nd place, silver medalist(s) | |
| 1992 Barcelona | Ross Davis | United States | Athletics | Men's 200 m C3–4 | 2nd place, silver medalist(s) | |
| 1992 Barcelona | Ross Davis | United States | Athletics | Men's 400 m C3–4 | 2nd place, silver medalist(s) | |
| 1992 Barcelona | Ross Davis | United States | Athletics | Men's 800 m C3–4 | 2nd place, silver medalist(s) | |
| 1992 Barcelona | David Newkirk | United States | Volleyball | Men's standing | | |
| 1996 Atlanta | Ross Davis | United States | Athletics | Men's 100 m T34 | 1st place, gold medalist(s) | |
| 1996 Atlanta | Ross Davis | United States | Athletics | Men's 400 m T32–33 | 3rd place, bronze medalist(s) | |
| 1996 Atlanta | David Newkirk | United States | Volleyball | Men's standing | | |
| 2000 Sydney | Ross Davis | United States | Athletics | Men's 100 m T34 | 1st place, gold medalist(s) | |
| 2000 Sydney | Ross Davis | United States | Athletics | Men's 200 m T34 | 3rd place, bronze medalist(s) | |
| 2000 Sydney | Ross Davis | United States | Athletics | Men's 400 m T34 | 3rd place, bronze medalist(s) | |
| 2000 Sydney | David Newkirk | United States | Volleyball | Men's standing | | |
