= Camp Interlaken JCC =

Jewish summer camp in Wisconsin

Coordinates: 45.898872°N 89.401621°W

Camp Interlaken JCC, formally The Steve and Shari Sadek Family Camp Interlaken JCC, is a Jewish summer camp located in Eagle River, Wisconsin, United States. It provides residential camping for incoming 3rd through 10th grade Jewish children from around the world. The camp has been affiliated with the Milwaukee Jewish Community Center; previously it was called Camp Interlaken of the Pines for Boys and operated as a private camp since 1935.

The camp welcomes transgender and gender-fluid campers and staff. Jewish Living Magazine has ranked Camp Interlaken among the top Jewish summer camps in the country.

== History ==
Camp Interlaken was established in 1935, when Herbert Magida bought the Interlaken Hotel in Hartland, Wisconsin to serve as a summer camp for boys. In 1938 Magida moved the camp to a location in Eagle River, home to a number of other Jewish summer camps, where it remains. In 1948 Magida sold the camp to attorney Arthur Morse (owner of the Chicago Stags basketball team) and Joe Kupcinet, football coach at Taft High School and brother of Chicago Sun-Times columnist Irv Kupcinet. The Milwaukee JCC bought the camp in 1965.

== Activities ==
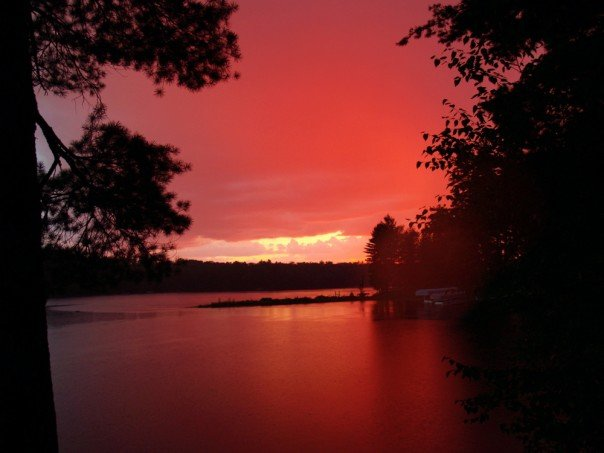
"Lake Sunset," a sunset over the lake at Camp Interlaken

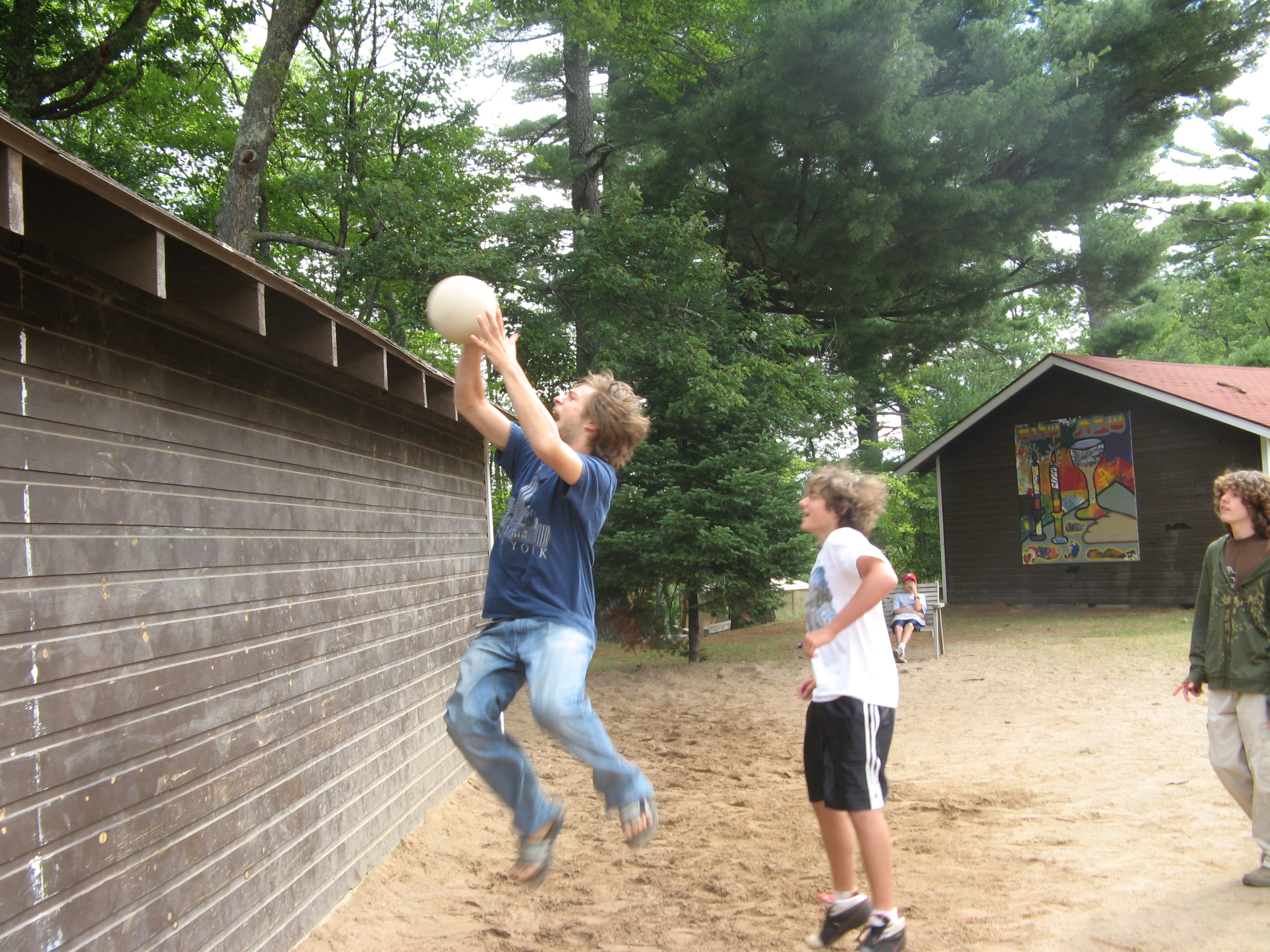
Ben Golopol in a heated moment of Tushball, the unofficial sport of Camp Interlaken

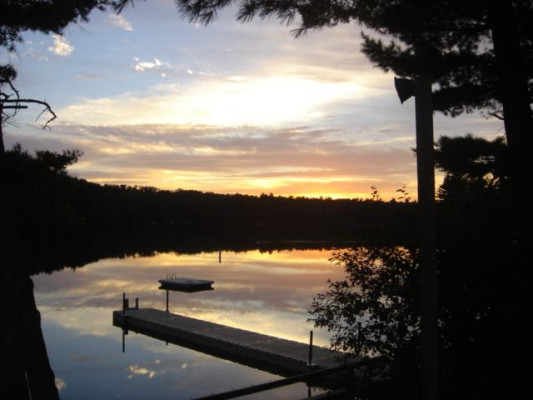
A photo of Lake Finley, the lake on which Camp Interlaken is located, taken by the docks.

Individual Sports: Tennis, Gymnastics, Golf, Disc golf, Tushball, Gaga, Archery, Cycling, Fitness, and Rock Climbing Wall.

Team Sports: Softball, Soccer, Basketball, Volleyball, Floor (Court) Hockey, High/Low Ropes with Zip Line. Ultimate Frisbee and Maccabiah.

Waterfront Activities: Waterskiing, Wake-boarding, Knee-boarding, Windsurfing, Sailing, Small Crafts, Swimming, Life Guard Training

Cultural and Creative activities: Ceramics, Fine Arts, YOGA, Aerobics, Modern Dance, Theater, Theater Tech, Israeli Dance, Bar/Bat Mitzvah Preparation, Woodworking, Crafts, Guitar, Photography, Video, Nature, Fishing and Shabbat.

== Notable attendees ==
Former Hall of Fame NFL football coach Marv Levy spent several summers in the 1950s working at Camp Interlaken when it was run by Joe Kupcinet, before it was owned by the JCC.

In the summer of 1983, Israeli future Olympic marathoner Shem-Tov Sabag worked at the camp, developing a running program.
