= Interlachen High School =

Coordinates: 29.6313572°N 81.8853684°W

Location
- 126 N. County Road 315; Interlachen, Florida; United States

Information
- Other name: IHS
- Type: Public High School
- Motto: Integrity Honor Success
- Established: 1968
- School district: Putnam County School District
- Superintendent: Rick Surrency
- Principal: Amber Symonds
- Teaching staff: 50.49 (FTE)
- Grades: 7–12
- Enrollment: 1,068 (2023–2024)
- Student to teacher ratio: 21.15
- Colors: Royal blue and white
- Mascot: Rams
- Accreditation: AdvancED
- Yearbook: Ramtrax
- Website: Rampage

Interlachen Middle-High School is a public high school and public middle school located in Interlachen, Florida, United States, operated by the Putnam County School Board. The principal is Amber Symonds.

== Students ==
There are currently 846 students enrolled at Interlachen Middle-High School. Most of the students come from close by elementary schools Robert H. Jenkins Elementary, Ochwilla Elementary and Melrose Elementary.

Interlachen High boasts much diversity:

- 75% of students are white
- 12% of students are Hispanic
- 10% of students are black

There is a 5% dropout rate and a 70% graduation rate. Sixty percent of the students qualify for free or reduced lunch, which is a significant increase from the state average of forty-six percent. The student-to-teacher ratio is approximately 20:1.

== Academics ==
Interlachen High School offers standard and Honors courses in the core curriculum (language arts, mathematics, social studies, science). An array of vocational programs are offered as well, including Agriscience, Business, Junior Reserve Officer Training Corps, Criminal Justice, Welding, Construction and Health Science. Performing arts courses include Drama, Yearbook, Band, Color Guard, Culinary Arts, and Drawing/Painting.

IHS also has many after-school and extra-curricular programs. The school holds branches of several national ly recognized clubs, such as National Honor Society and Future Farmers of America. Other clubs include: Literacy Circle, Fellowship of Christian Students, and Circle of Diversity and Equality.

=== Band ===
Interlachen High School's band actively competes in competitions and festivals. From 1993 to 2005, the band held a "Superior" rating streak from the Florida Music Educators Association. In the summer of 2007, the band traveled to London, England, to perform in front of Westminster Abbey. The color guard is among the few to have performed at Westminster Abbey. In 2009 the band also received a "Superior" at the Florida Bandmasters Association for marching with their show La Nouba.

== Athletics ==
Interlachen High School has a long and rich history of school sports. Hanging in the wall of its gymnasium are banners containing many proud achievements of athletes throughout the years, from District to State Champions. As recently as 2011 students from Interlachen High have entered in championships at the state level and placed in the top 10.

== Notable staff ==
- Willie Offord, head football coach (2009–2011)
