= Lake Innisfree =

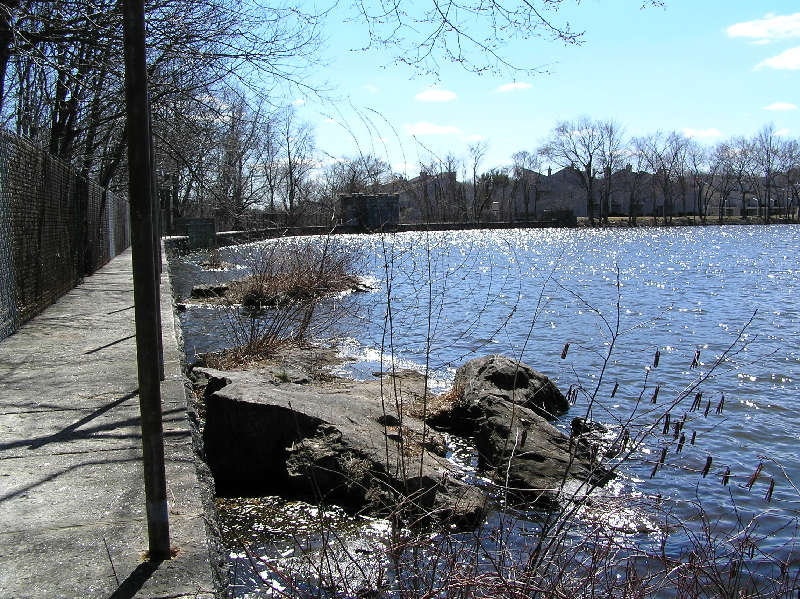

- Location within New York
- Location: New Rochelle and Eastchester, New York
- Coordinates: 40°57′31″N 73°48′02″W
- Type: Reservoir
- Primary inflows: Hutchinson River
- Primary outflows: Hutchinson River
- Basin countries: United States
- Surface area: 65 acres (26 ha)
- Water volume: 271.7 million US gallons (1,028,000 m^{3})

Lake Innisfree (also known as Lake Isle or Interlaken, and originally as Reservoir No. 1) is a man-made lake and former reservoir in the city of New Rochelle and the town of Eastchester, in Westchester County, New York. Its eastern end abuts the Hutchinson River Parkway. The lake takes its name from the poem Lake Isle of Innisfree by W. B. Yeats.

== Overview ==
The area surrounding the lake was once rolling woodland owned in large sections by farmers in the 1700-1800s. The New Rochelle Water Company then bought up the land using it as a watershed for the lake served as the water supply source for Upper Rochelle during the late 19th and early 20th centuries.

Constructed in 1885, the reservoir is impounded by the New Rochelle Reservoir No. 1 Dam on the Hutchinson River. The dam is masonry and of earthen construction, with a height of 34 ft (10 m) and a length of 680 ft (210 m). The water surface covers an area of about 65 acres (26 ha) and the capacity is about 271.7 million US gallons (1,028,000 m^{3}). It has a maximum discharge of 744 cubic feet (21.1 m^{3}) per second and drains an area of 2.2 square miles (5.7 km^{2}).

The water from this reservoir flows by gravity to the southern, low level district of the city. There is a steel equalizing tank 34 ft (10 m) high by 44 ft (13 m) in diameter connected with this system on high ground 2 miles (3.2 km) south of the dam. The dam, which impounded 300 million gallons of water, cost $60,000 to build. While at first, the water supplied New Rochelle exclusively, two additional dams were constructed so that the water could also be routed to Pelham, Eastchester, and elsewhere.

The reservoir was named Lake Innisfree in the 1930s by the developer of the adjacent Interlaken Cooperative. The same developer constructed a sandy beach for recreation.

In 2022, Eastchester took ownership of the central portion of the lake's dam.

== See also ==
- History of New Rochelle, New York
