= List of people from Palatka, Florida =

This is a list of Palatkans who are notable citizens of Palatka, Florida.

== Born and raised in Palatka ==
The following people were born and spent a significant amount of their growing-up years in Palatka.

- Clayton Beauford, professional football player
- William L. Calhoun, admiral
- Kevis Coley, professional football player
- John Crawford, author
- Bill Foster, college basketball coach
- Camellia Johnson, opera singer
- John Henry Lloyd, National Baseball Hall of Fame, 1977
- Michelle McCool, WWE retired professional wrestler, former 2X holder of the WWE Women's Championship (1956-2010) and former 2X WWE Divas Champion
- Steven Douglas Merryday, judge
- Willie Offord, professional football player
- Charles Sharon, professional football player
- Jarvis Williams, professional football player
- John L. Williams, professional football player

== Born elsewhere, raised in Palatka ==
The following people were not born in Palatka, but spent a significant amount of their growing-up years in the city.

- Omar Ahmad, Internet entrepreneur and politician
- H. M. Fearnside, businessman, politician, served as mayor of Palatka
- Isaac Guillory, folk musician
- Robert H. Jenkins, Jr., Vietnam veteran, Medal of Honor recipient
- Kelley Smith, congressman
- Johnny Tillotson, singer-songwriter

== Born in Palatka, raised elsewhere ==
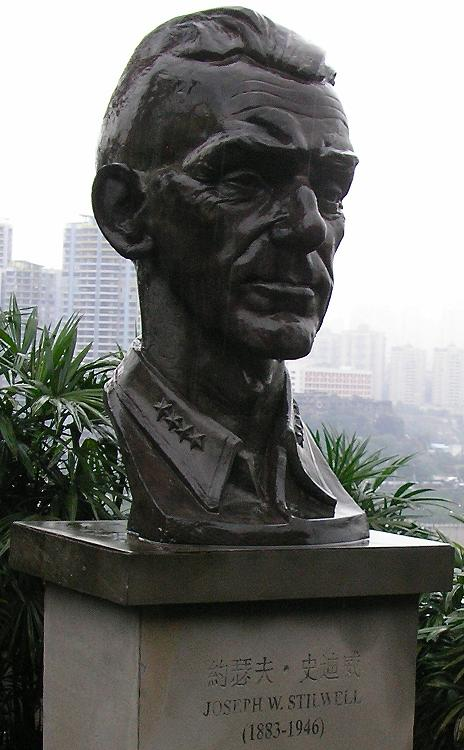
Joseph Warren Stilwell

The following people were born in Palatka but spent most (if not all) of their growing-up years away from the city.

- Odell Barnes, entrepreneur
- Earl Leggett, professional football player
- Medwin Peek, architect
- Joseph Warren Stilwell, general
- George Tucker, jazz musician

== Significant to Palatka ==
The following people were born and raised elsewhere, but played a significant role in the community.

- Mary McLeod Bethune, educator, founder Bethune Cookman University
- Isaac H. Bronson, judge and congressman
- William A. Forward, politician and judge
- Hubbard Hart, steamboat operator and hotelier
- Slomon Moody, physician
- William Dunn Moseley, first governor of Florida
