= Putnam County Business Park =

Commercial area in Putnam County, Florida, USA

Coordinates: 29°38′58″N 81°42′7″W

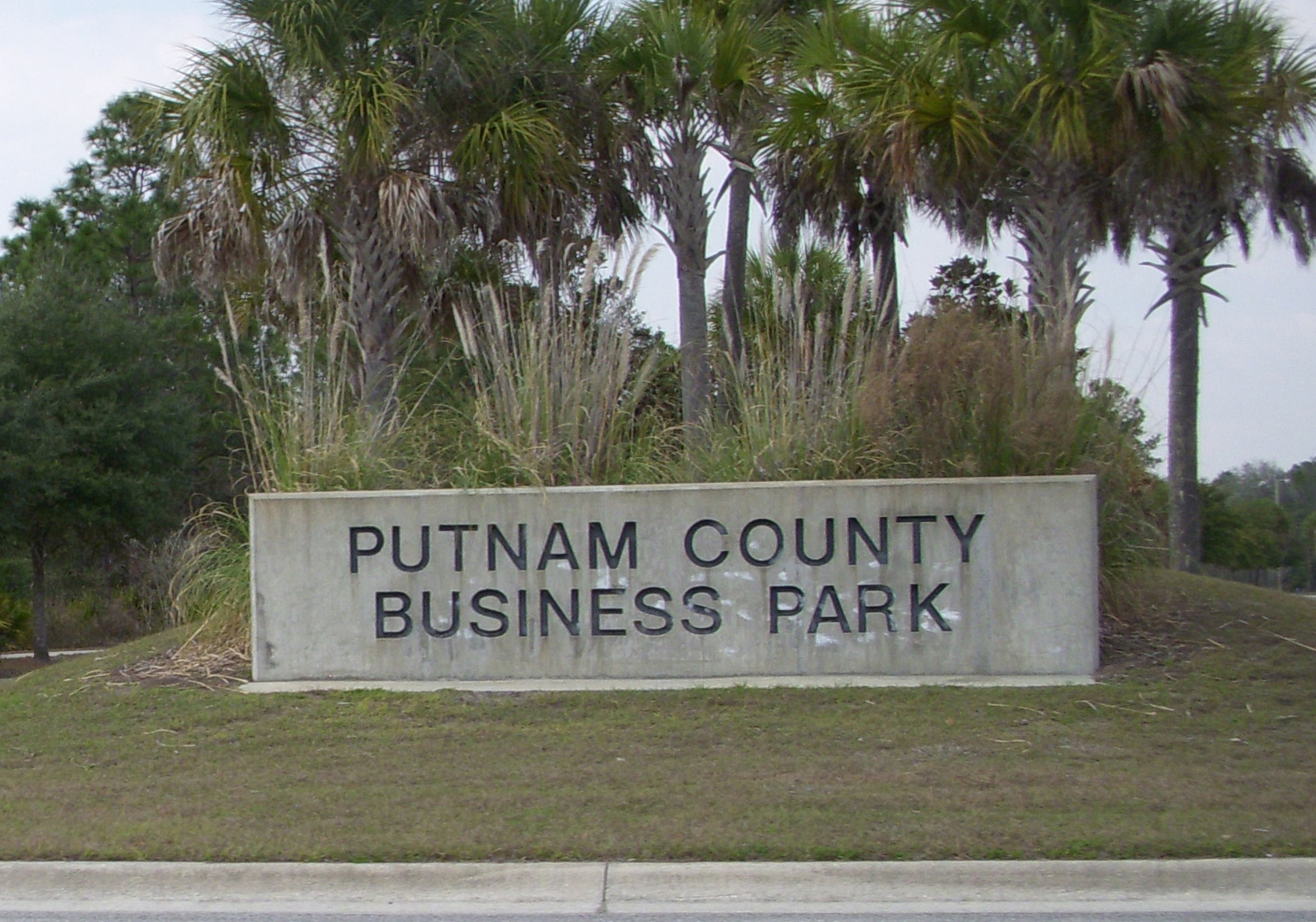
- Development Type: Business Park
- Location: Palatka; Putnam County, Florida
- Tenant's Operations: Call Center
- Tenants: Alorica
- Size: 257 Acres
- Developer: Unknown
- Owner: Putnam County Port Authority

Putnam County Business Park is a commercial development area located in Palatka, Florida. The 257-acre site borders Palatka Municipal Airport and is in close proximity to Putnam Community Medical Center and St. Johns River State College. The business center is owned by Putnam County and Putnam County Port Authority. Alorica was the only tenant occupying the park until it closed in 2015. The telecommunications and business solutions company operated a call center on the property. The former Alorica call center building is for lease. Other sites are shovel ready.
