= Putnam County Port Authority =

- Abbreviation: PCPA
- Formation: July 4, 1967
- Type: agency
- Legal status: Dependent
- Purpose: Port facilities
- Location: East Palatka, Florida
- Region served: Putnam County, Florida
- Members: Putnam County Board of County Commissioners
- Director: Press Tompkins

Putnam County Port Authority is a public corporation established to develop and manage port facilities in Putnam County, Florida. Created in 1967 by Florida Law 67-1967, the port district is one of 16 in the Sunshine State. The Port Authority also owns and maintains industrial and commercial development areas. The Putnam County Board of County Commissioners serves as the governing body of the entity. Considered a component unit, elected county officials set policies and oversee major expenditures. The board does not hold regular meetings of the Port Authority; rather, meetings are held on a situational basis. Putnam County Public Works and the Port Authority are understood as blended units; as such, day-to-day operations are carried out by the office of Public Works.

Facilities

- Barge Port, located in Palatka, is a port facility and industrial development area situated alongside the St. Johns River. The development inhabits a relatively deep portion of river maintained by the Army Corps of Engineers. The area is accessible by both CSX rail line and US 17.
- Putnam County Business Park is a 257 arch commercial development also located in Palatka. The property is directly adjacent to Palatka Municipal Airport and is proximal to both Putnam Community Medical Center and St. Johns River State College.
