= Kelley Smith =

American politician

Kelley R. Smith
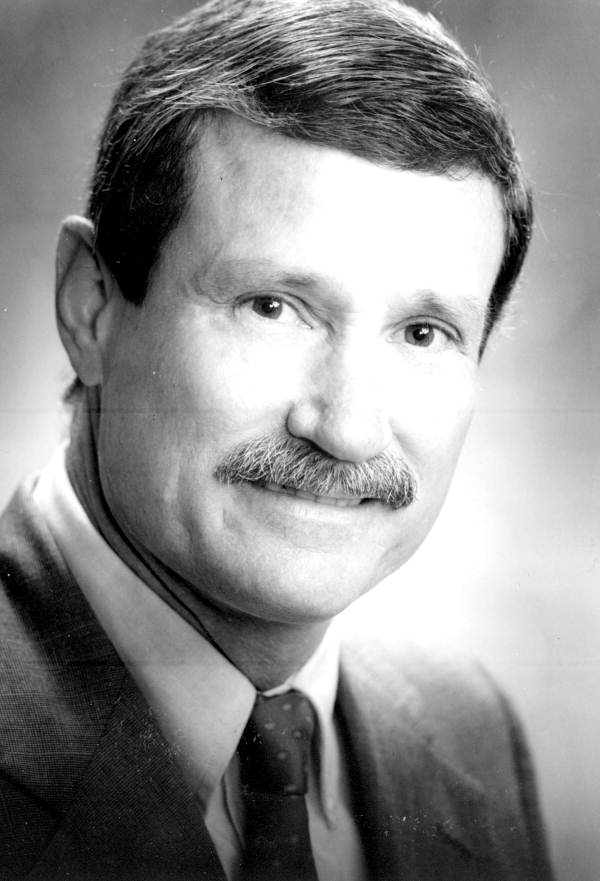
- Smith in 1992

Member of the Florida House of Representatives from the 21st district
- Preceded by: Roy Campbell
- Succeeded by: Joe Pickens

Personal details
- Born: October 25, 1946 (age 79)
- Party: Democratic

Kelley R. Smith (born October 25, 1946) is an American former politician in the state of Florida. He served as a representative in the Florida House of Representatives.

== Early life ==
Smith was born on October 25, 1946, in St. Augustine, Florida. His father, Kelley Smith, Sr., was a member of the Putnam County School Board. He attended St. Johns River Community College, where he received his A.A. in 1966. He received a bachelor of arts degree from the University of Florida in 1968, where he was a member of the Pi Kappa Alpha fraternity. Smith served in the Florida National Guard between 1968 and 1988 and worked in forestry.

He was a Putnam County Commissioner between 1976 and 1984, serving as the chair in 1980 and 1983, a member of the Putnam County Development Authority between 1978 and 1984, and a member of the Putnam County Port Authority between 1976 and 1984. He was on the Northeast Florida Regional Planning Council from 1977 to 1984, serving as the chair in 1982 and 1983, and a member of the St. Johns River Water Management District Governing Board from 1985 to 1989, serving as the vice chair in 1988 and 1989.

== Political career ==
Smith served as a representative in the Florida House of Representatives, being first elected on April 17, 1990.

== Personal life ==
He lives in Palatka, Florida, with his family. He has two children, Troy and Cassie, and two stepchildren, Brooke and Blair.
