= Palatka North Historic District =

Historic district in Florida, United States

- U.S. National Register of Historic Places
- U.S. Historic district
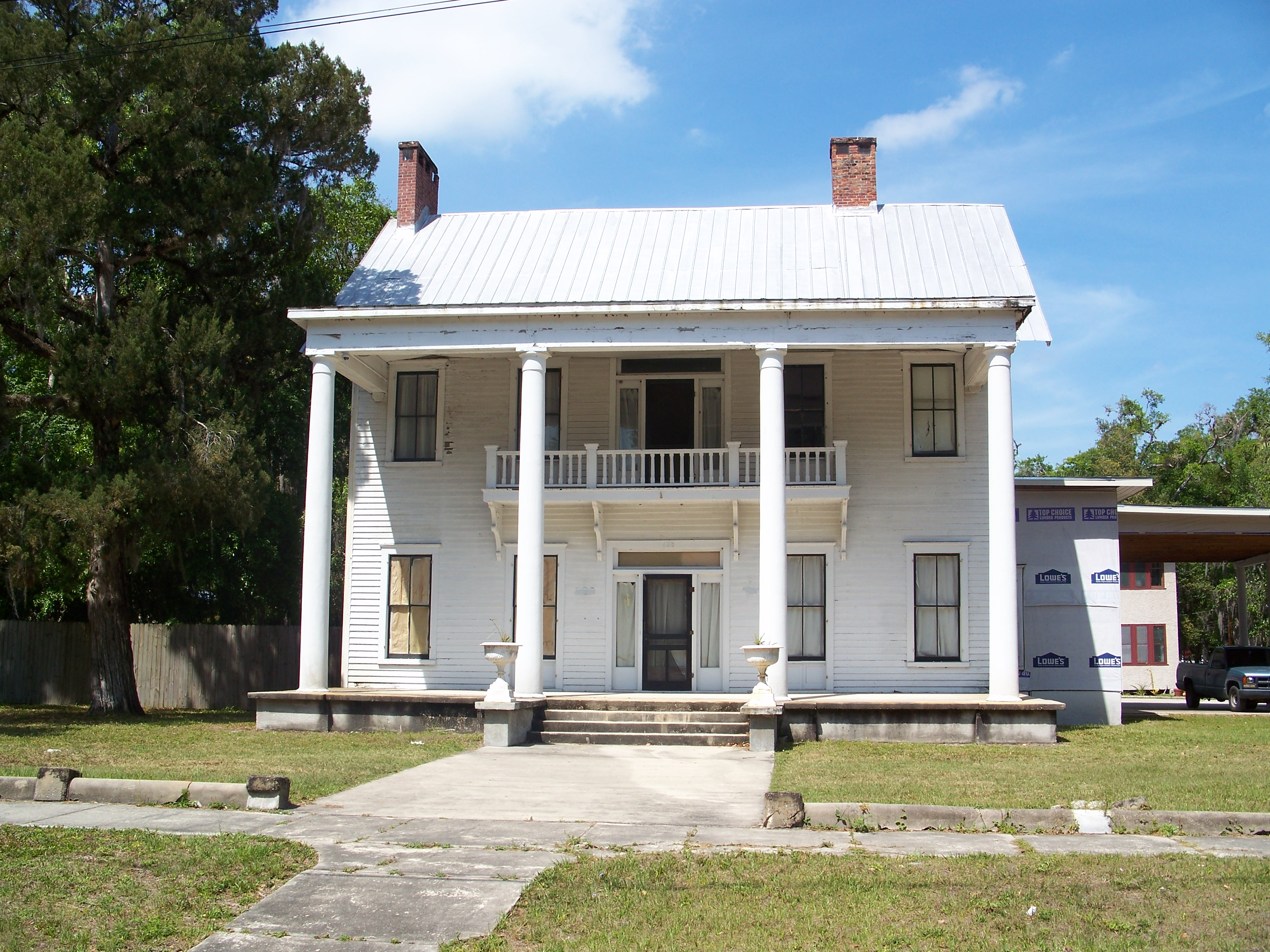
- William F. Forward house in the district

- Location within Florida Location within the United States
- Location: Palatka, Florida
- Coordinates: 29°38′59″N 81°37′47″W
- Area: 35 acres (140,000 m^{2})
- NRHP reference No.: 83003552
- Added to NRHP: November 17, 1983

The Palatka North Historic District is a U.S. historic district (designated as such on November 17, 1983) located in Palatka, Florida. The district is bounded by the St. Johns River, Bronson, North 1st, North 5th, and Main Streets. It contains 76 historic buildings, including the Bronson-Mulholland House and St. Mark's Episcopal Church.
