= Robert L. McLendon Jr. =

American academic

Robert McLendon

President of St. Johns River Community College
- In office 1972 – November 1, 2008
- Preceded by: Dr. LaPradd
- Succeeded by: Joe Pickens

Personal details
- Education: Florida State; Florida Southern

Robert L. McLendon Jr. was an American academic, and the former president of St. Johns River Community College based in Palatka, Florida. He served as the president from 1972 to 2008. With his 36-year tenure he was one of the longest-serving presidents in the history of the Florida Community Colleges System.

McLendon was instrumental in transitioning the school from a community college to a state college. With expansion of programs, he led it to be designated as St. Johns River State College. He also developed two more campuses in Orange Park and St. Augustine. McLendon graduated with his bachelor's degree from Florida Southern College. He received his master's degree and doctorate from Florida State University. McLendon had previously served as vice-president and dean of academic affairs at SJRCC before he was appointed president.

He died on April 26, 2022, at the age of 84.

== See also ==
- St. Johns River Community College
- Florida Community Colleges System
