= Putnam County Barge Port =

- Interactive map of Putnam County Barge Port

Location
- Country: United States
- Location: Palatka, Florida
- Coordinates: 29°41′9″N 81°39′26″W

Details
- Opened: 1970
- Owned by: Putnam County Port Authority
- Type of harbour: Natural/Artificial
- No. of wharfs: 1

Putnam County Barge Port is a port facility and industrial development area located in Palatka, Florida, United States. Positioned on the waters of the St. Johns River, tenants enjoy access to navigable waters maintained at 40 feet by the Army Corps of Engineers. The area is also accessible by CSX rail line and US 17. Management and development of the site is conducted through Putnam County Port Authority. The barge port has a 410-foot-long (120 m) wharf. Most of the barge freight is paper products. Major port facilities are located 60 miles downriver in Jacksonville.

== Users ==
Current and former users at Barge Port include:

- Apex Metal Fabrication
- AT&T
- Beck Auto Group
- Caraustar Industrial & Consumer
- DSI Forms Inc,
- First Coast Technical College (branch closed in 2019)
- Florida Rock Industries
- Georgia Pacific
- Hanson plc
- Lion Pool Products
- Mitchell Grayson Inc
- Newcastle Shipyard LLC
- Price Brothers
- Prichett Trucking
- PDM Bridge
- Southwestern Electric
- Weststaff

== History ==
In 1970, the Cross Florida Barge Canal was still viewed as viable, with one-third of the project complete. That same year, Putnam County Port Authority completed Barge Port in anticipation of increased development interest. Palatka was seemingly poised to experience maritime growth due to its location on the St. Johns River and the newly constructed canal system. By 1971, serious ecological and environmental concerns were brought to the attention of the public. The threat of saltwater contamination in the fragile freshwater ecosystems of inland Florida subsequently brought the canal project to an end. Barge Port has managed to thrive in the absences of a Gulf of Mexico route.
