= Palatka South Historic District =

Historic district in Florida, United States

- U.S. National Register of Historic Places
- U.S. Historic district
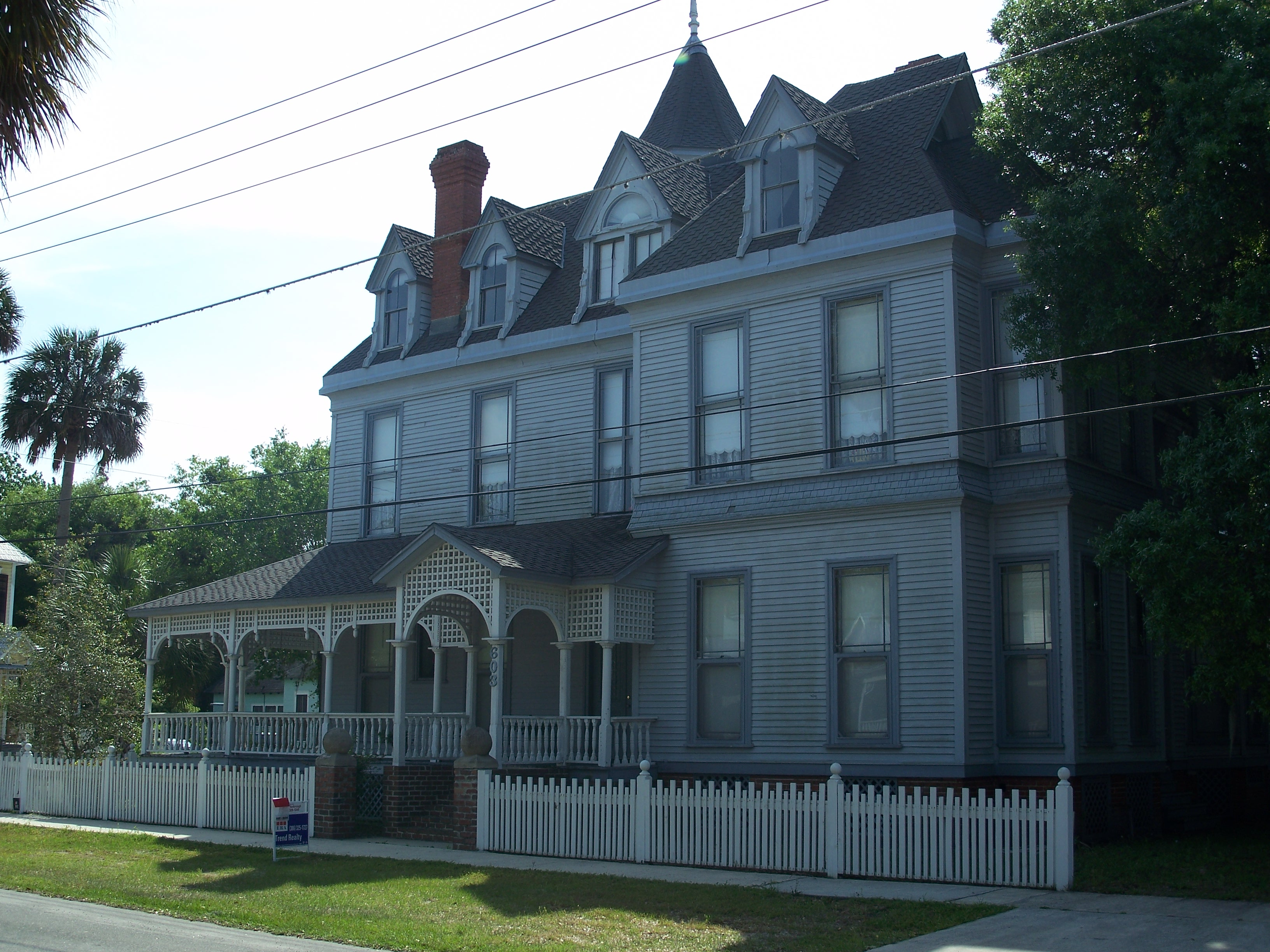
- House in the district

- Location within Florida Location within the United States
- Location: Palatka, Florida
- Coordinates: 29°38′40″N 81°38′6″W
- Area: 93 acres (380,000 m^{2})
- NRHP reference No.: 83003553
- Added to NRHP: November 17, 1983

The Palatka South Historic District is a U.S. historic district (designated as such on November 17, 1983) located in Palatka, Florida.
