= Odell Barnes (entrepreneur) =

American real estate investor

- Born: James Odell Barnes, Jr. October 20, 1951 (age 75); Palatka, Florida, United States

James Odell Barnes Jr. (aka Odell Barnes) has earned the nickname "Foreclosure King." His firm, Odell Barnes REO, is a bulk-buyer of foreclosed homes in the United States. For decades, Barnes has been buying foreclosed homes in bulk from banks and other mortgage-lenders and selling them to a network of private investors and directly to homeowners. Barnes and his investors sell the homes below current market value, typically with low down payments and higher-than-normal interest rates.

== Foreclosure crisis ==
Barnes gained notoriety after being featured on "Nightline". With the 2008 financial crisis in full swing, Barnes was one of the few people still doing well in the real estate market.

"Two years ago, you bought 100, 200 houses a month, now you buy 2,000 to 3,000 houses a month and it's going to be more," Barnes said. "They don't know what to do with them, the mortgage companies, and they're just dumping them."

== Business practices ==
Barnes buys homes from banks at deep discounts ("pennies on the dollar"). He and his investors mark their homes for sale at prices below comparable rentals and apply higher-than-market interest rates.

"People want to own a home," said Barnes. "And these people -- they're poor, they ain't dumb. They know how to put in a hot-water heater. If their house needs to be painted, they'll go to Lowe's to buy a gallon of paint and they'll paint it. They don't have book sense, but they know how to fix up their house. And it's amazing -- you go to them and they fix them up and they're so proud and they own a home."

The benefit of Barnes business to lower-income groups is debatable. Barnes emphasizes that he provides for people with no other way of achieving home-ownership. According to an investor:

You're more involved in the neighborhood if you own the house versus a renter... A renter is typically in the mindset of just passing through. I had an opportunity where we sold a house that we were renting; a homeowner bought the house and put a new roof on it. Suddenly they care.

== Personal life ==
He was last married to Wanda Barnes and had two step daughters.
