= Joe Pickens =

American politician

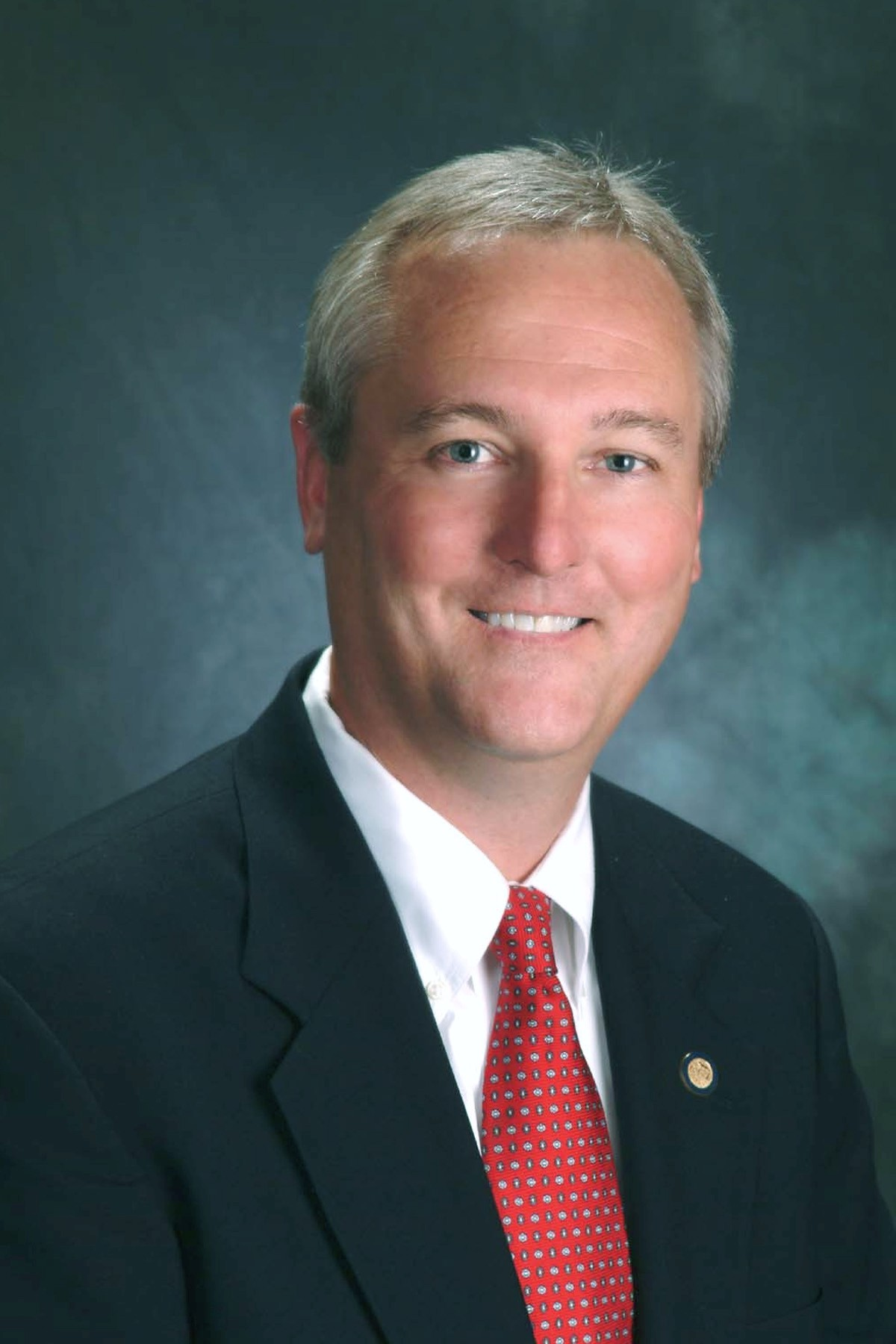

President of St. Johns River Community College
- Incumbent
- Assumed office November 1, 2008
- Preceded by: Robert L. McLendon Jr.

Member of the Florida House of Representatives from the 21st district
- In office November 21, 2000 – November 18, 2008
- Preceded by: Kelley Smith
- Succeeded by: Charles Van Zant

Personal details
- Born: November 5, 1958 (age 67) DeLand, Florida
- Party: Republican
- Education: Wofford College (BA); University of Florida (JD)
- Profession: Attorney

Joe Hill Pickens (born November 5, 1958) is an American politician, educator, and college administrator who currently serves as President of St. Johns River State College. He previously served in the Florida House of Representatives from 2000 to 2008, representing District 21.

Pickens was born in DeLand, Florida. He received his bachelor's degree from Wofford College, and his Juris Doctor from the University of Florida. He has three children. He was elected to the Florida House of Representatives in 2000. During his tenure he served as Chairman of the Schools and Learning Council and Education Appropriations Committee, among others. He was appointed by Governor Crist to represent Florida on the Southern Regional Education Board. After leaving office he was named President of St. Johns River Community College, now St. Johns River State College, on November 1, 2008, taking over for Robert L. McLendon, Jr.
