= H. M. Fearnside =

American businessman and politician

- Fearnside in 1939

Member of the Florida House of Representatives from Putnam County
- In office 1935–1937
- In office 1939–1941

Personal details
- Died: 1964 (aged 79) Palatka, Florida, U.S.
- Party: Democratic
- Spouse: June Fearnside
- Children: 2
- Occupation: Businessman

H. M. Fearnside (died 1964) was an American businessman and politician. He served as a Democratic member of the Florida House of Representatives.

In 1913, Fearnside was elected as mayor of Palatka, Florida. In 1935, Fearnside was elected to the Florida House of Representatives, serving until 1937, and then again from 1939 to 1941.

Fearnside died in 1964 of cancer in Palatka, Florida, at the age of 79.
