= Larimer Memorial Library =

- U.S. National Register of Historic Places
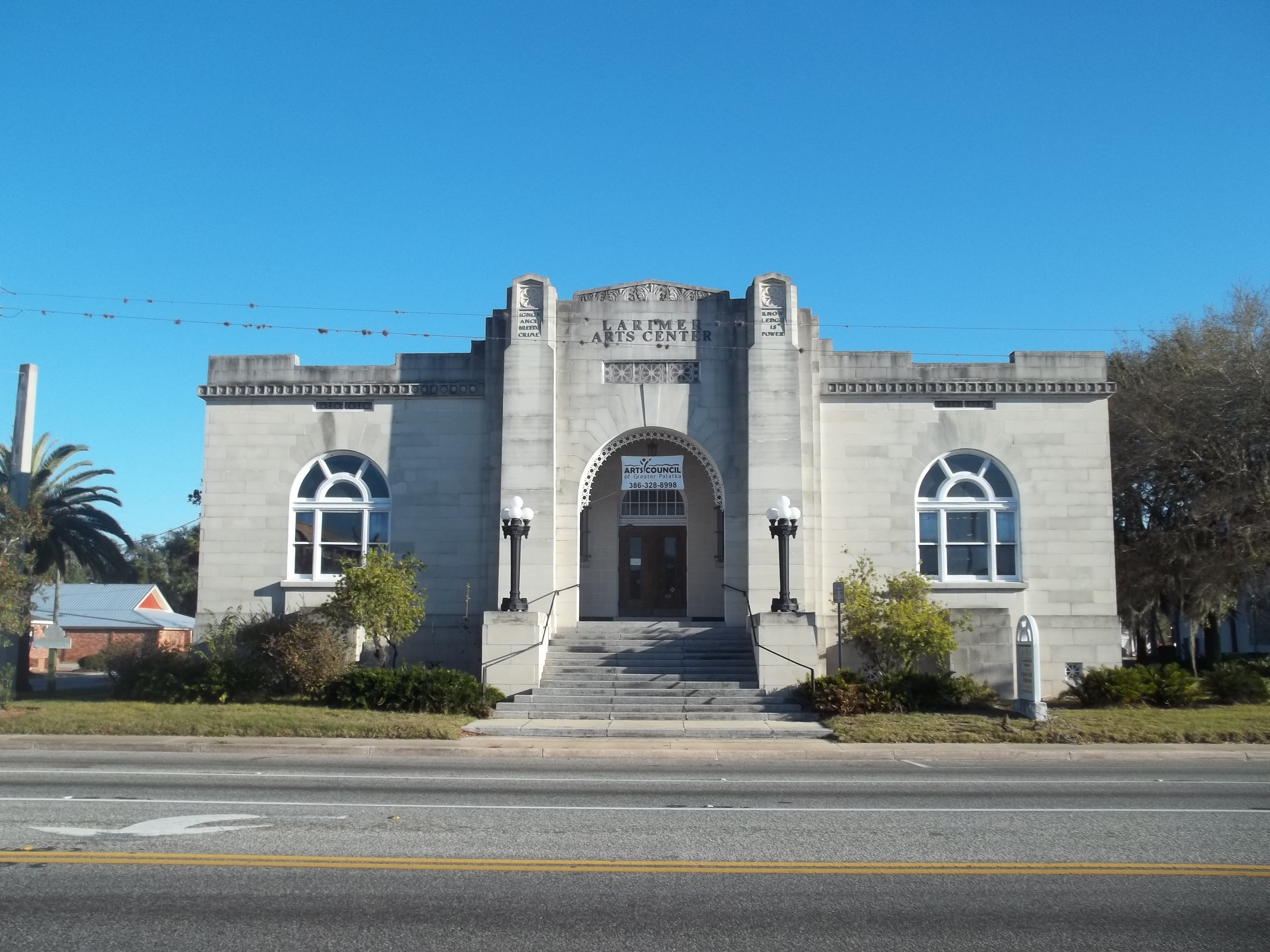

- Location within Florida Location within the United States
- Location: Palatka, Florida, USA
- Coordinates: 29°38′51″N 81°37′50″W
- Built: 1929
- Architect: Henry John Klutho
- Architectural style: Prairie School, Art Deco
- NRHP reference No.: 08000163
- Added to NRHP: March 12, 2008

Larimer Memorial Library is a historic library at 216 Reid Street in the city of Palatka, Putnam County, Florida, in the United States. Was occupied by the Arts Council of Greater Palatka in 1992 and renamed the Larimer Arts Center. On March 12, 2008, it was added to the U.S. National Register of Historic Places. In 2025 the City of Palatka allowed the Larimer Arts Center to change management to the River City Players. It is currently the home of the River City Players community theater, the Arts Alliance of Putnam, and arts advocacy non-profit, and the Gathering Artists of Putnam LLC, a membership organization of visual artists.

The library, commissioned by James Ross Mellon, a wealthy seasonal resident of the city, was constructed in 1929 at a cost of $100,000. Henry John Klutho was selected to design the structure. Mellon named the library for his wife Rachel Hughey Larimer. The library would be dedicated and donated to the City of Palatka in April 1930 in an event attended by thousands. The presidents of the University of Florida, Florida Southern College, Stetson University, and the Florida State College for Women each spoke at the ceremony.

Of Klutho's surviving buildings, by 1983 the Larimer was one of only 3 listed as still being in “excellent condition”. The building's architectural style is a mix of the Prairie School and Art Deco. It is constructed of limestone with a basement and one story above. The otherwise symmetrical façade of the building bears two phrases: “Ignorance breeds crime” on the left of the entrance and “Knowledge is power” to the right. Iron filigree adorns the recessed portico of the building's double door entranceway at the top of a flight of steps. Upon the library's completion, there were two reading rooms to either side of entrance. The library's bookshelves were on the first floor, across the backside of the building. These bookshelves housed 50,000 books, as well as other publications such as newspapers. Until 1992 when the library was converted into the Larimer Arts Center, the library had a children's room, a librarian's office, and a magazine room, as well as the main reading room.

Today the Larimer Arts Center houses an art gallery, conference area and the Scarlett-Hill Theater on the main floor, with classrooms, a black-box theater, a teachers' resource center and multiple works areas on the lower floor.
