= Charles Van Zant =

American architect

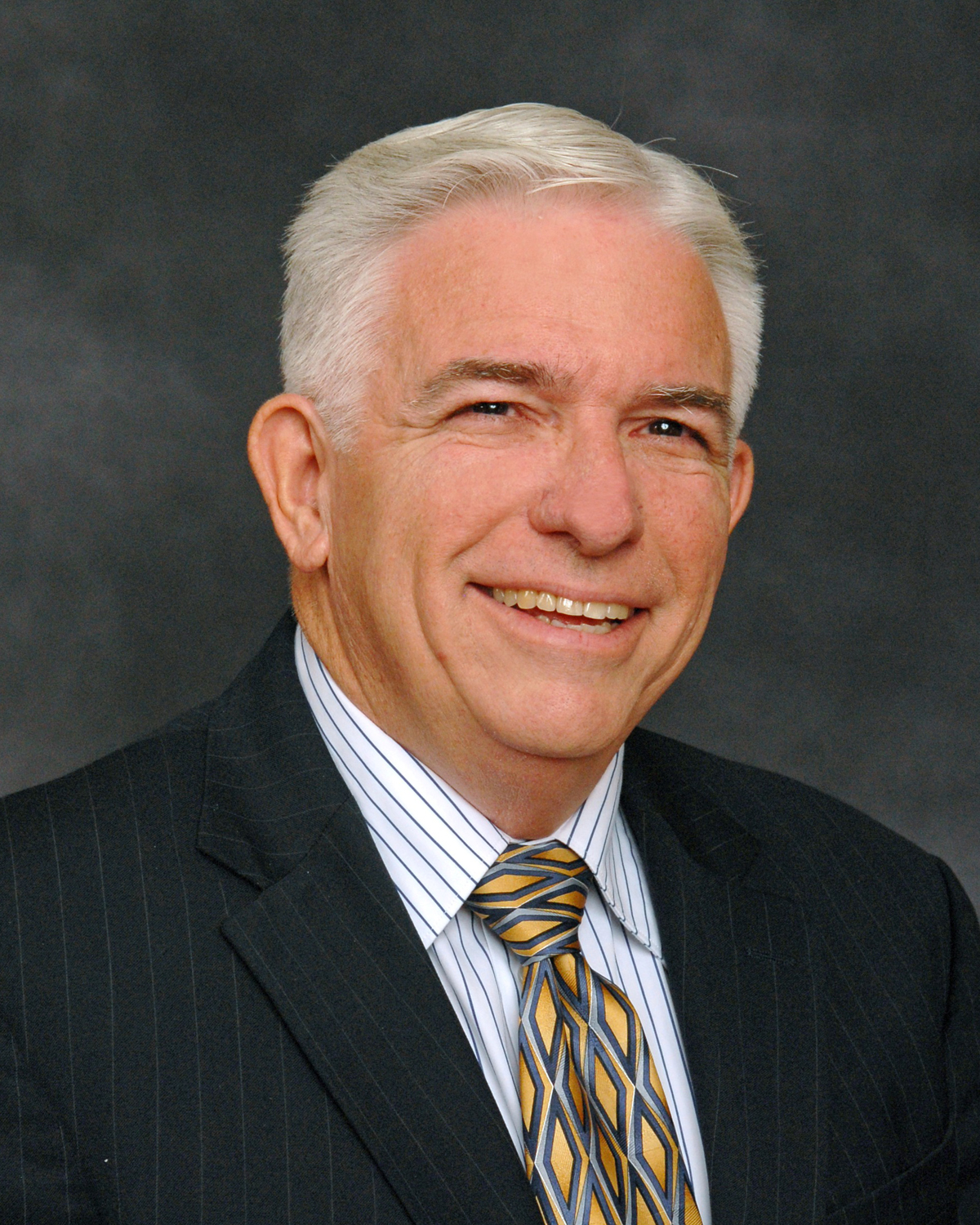

Member of the Florida House of Representatives from the 19th district
- In office November 20, 2008 – November 8, 2016
- Preceded by: Joe Pickens
- Succeeded by: Bobby Payne
- Constituency: 21st district (2008–2012); 19th district (2012–2016)

Personal details
- Born: November 24, 1943 (age 82) Jacksonville, Florida
- Party: Republican
- Spouse: Katherine
- Children: Michael; Scott; Charles, Jr. Kimberly; Katie; Daniel; Joshua; Lydia
- Education: University of Florida (B.Des.); Southern Baptist Theological Seminary (M.Div.); Western Baptist Theological Seminary (D.Th.)
- Profession: Architect

Charles E. Van Zant (born November 24, 1943) is an American architect and Southern Baptist minister who served as a Republican member of the Florida House of Representatives. From 2012 to 2016, Van Zant represented the 19th District, which includes Bradford County, Putnam County, Union County, and southern Clay County. Van Zant previously represented the 21st District from 2008 to 2012.

== History ==
Van Zant was born in Jacksonville and attended Stetson University before graduating from the University of Florida with a degree in architecture in 1968. Upon graduation, he founded Van Zant Associates, an architecture firm, which he continues to own. Van Zant attended the Southern Baptist Theological Seminary, where he received a Master of Divinity degree, and the Western Baptist Theological Seminary, where he received a Doctorate of Theology degree. In addition to working as an architect, he has served as the pastor of multiple churches, included the First Baptist Church of Keystone Heights and Trinity Baptist Church. Van Zant was appointed to the Clay County School Board in 2007 by Governor Charlie Crist, and served as its Vice-Chairman.

== Florida House of Representatives ==
When incumbent State Representative Joe Pickens was unable to seek re-election due to term limits, Van Zant ran to succeed him in the 21st District, which included a swath of territory in North Florida, specifically, southern Bradford County, southern Clay County, northern Lake County, eastern Marion County, Putnam County, and northwestern Volusia County. In the Republican primary, he emerged narrowly victorious over Christopher France and Patricia Freeman. Van Zant faced Linda Myers, a Putnam County Commissioner and the Democratic nominee, who identified as a conservative Democrat. Groups supporting Myers attacked Van Zant for tax evasion, and group supporting Van Zant attacked Myers for funding a "road to nowhere" and for tax increases; both candidates rejected each other's claims. Though they agreed on a number of issues, including the need to create jobs, allowing oil drilling off the coast of the state and replacing the Florida Comprehensive Assessment Test, they vehemently disagreed as to which of them was the most qualified to handle the issues of contention. Van Zant narrowly defeated Myers, winning by fewer than 2,000 votes, with 51.5% of the vote to Myers's 48.5%. Though Myers initially announced that she would seek a rematch with Van Zant in 2010, she ultimately declined to contest the seat, and he was re-elected without opposition.

When the state legislative districts were redrawn in 2012, Van Zant was moved into the 19th District, which retained the Clay County and Putnam County areas of the district, but added sections in Bradford County and Union County. In both the primary and general elections, Van Zant was elected unopposed. In 2014, Van Zant was re-elected unopposed to his fourth and final term in the House.

At a 2014 event held by opponents of the Common Core State Standards Initiative, Van Zant announced that the American Institutes for Research, the group that helped create the tests that would be used in Florida, would be promoting a homosexual lifestyle in children, declaring, "These people that will now receive $220 million from the state of Florida unless this is stopped will promote double mindedness in state education, and attract every one of your children to become as homosexual as they possibly can."

== Church activities ==
Charles currently pastors a small church called Gospel Lighthouse. It is located in Gainesville, Florida. It is a non-denominational church with a Biblical worldview and a heart for service. It's been around for about 15 years and is slowly being built up.

Florida House of Representatives
Preceded by Joe Pickens	Member of the Florida House of Representatives from the 21st district 2008–2012	Succeeded by Keith Perry
Preceded by Mike Weinstein	Member of the Florida House of Representatives from the 19th district 2012–2016	Succeeded by Bobby Payne
