= St. Mark's Episcopal Church (Palatka, Florida) =

Historic church in Florida, United States

- U.S. National Register of Historic Places
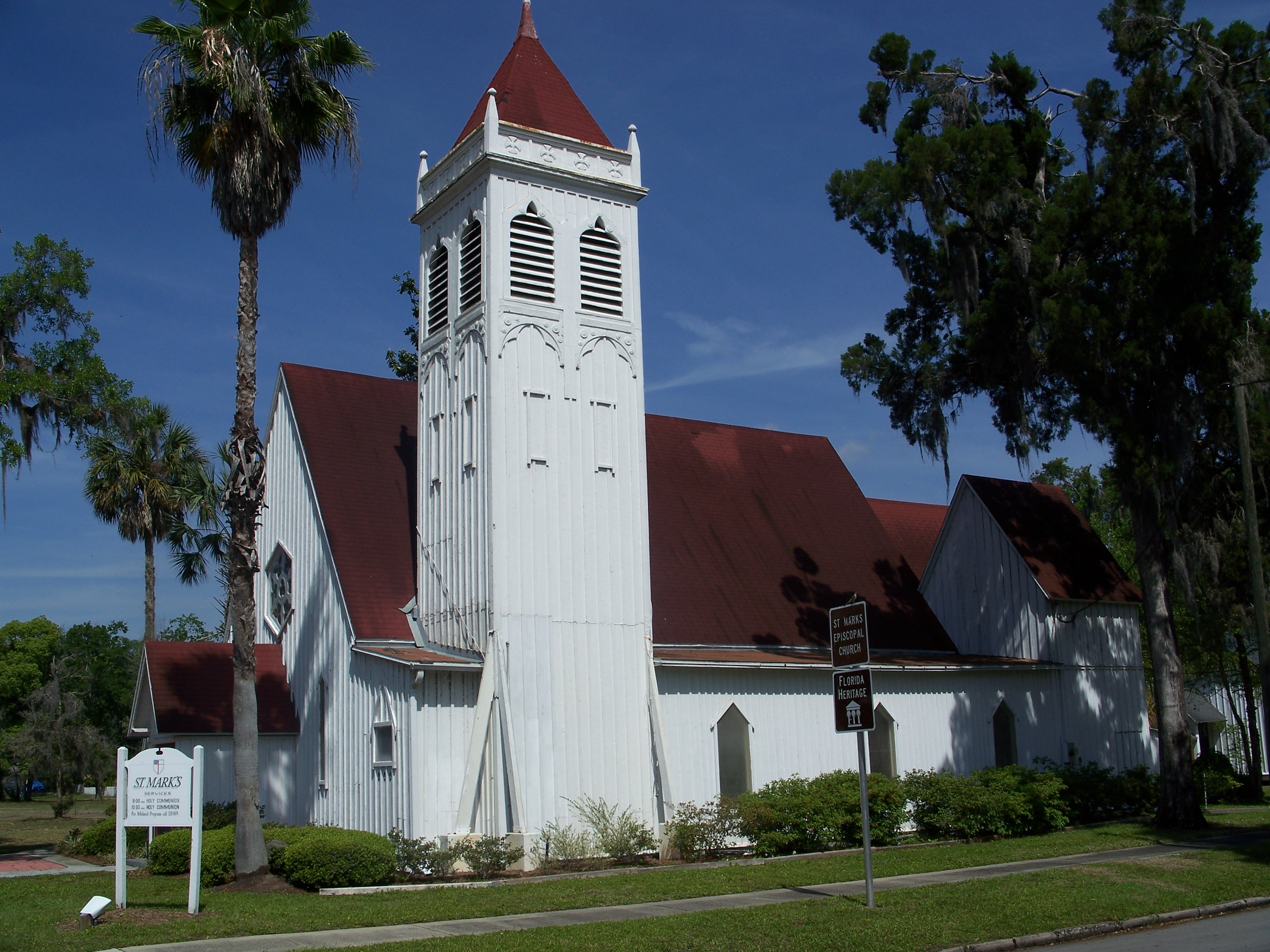

- Location within Florida Location within the United States
- Location: 200 Main Street, Palatka, Florida
- Coordinates: 29°38′55″N 81°37′46″W
- Built: 1854
- NRHP reference No.: 73000602
- Added to NRHP: May 9, 1973

St. Mark's Episcopal Church is a parish of the Episcopal Church in Palatka, Florida in the United States, in the Episcopal Diocese of Florida. The current rector is The Rev. Jon Davis, PhD.

It is noted for its historic Carpenter Gothic church located at 200 Main Street. On May 9, 1973, it was added to the National Register of Historic Places.

== History ==
The oldest church in Palatka, St. Mark's was established in 1853. The Carpenter Gothic church building was erected in 1854 using board and batten siding with corner buttresses on the base of the bell tower. One of the founding members of St. Mark's was William D. Moseley, first governor of the state of Florida. During the early years, services were held only in the winter months and were conducted by visiting vicars from the Northern States. During the Civil War, the church was occupied by Union soldiers, who caused much damage to the structure. The church reopened after the war and achieved full parish status by 1873.

== National Register listing ==
- St. Marks Episcopal Church
- (added 1973 - Building - #73000602)
- 2nd and Main Sts., Palatka
- Historic Significance: Event
- Area of Significance: Religion
- Period of Significance: 1850–1874, 1875–1899
- Owner: Private
- Historic Function: Religion
- Historic Sub-function: Religious Structure
- Current Function: Religion
- Current Sub-function: Religious Structure

== Gallery ==
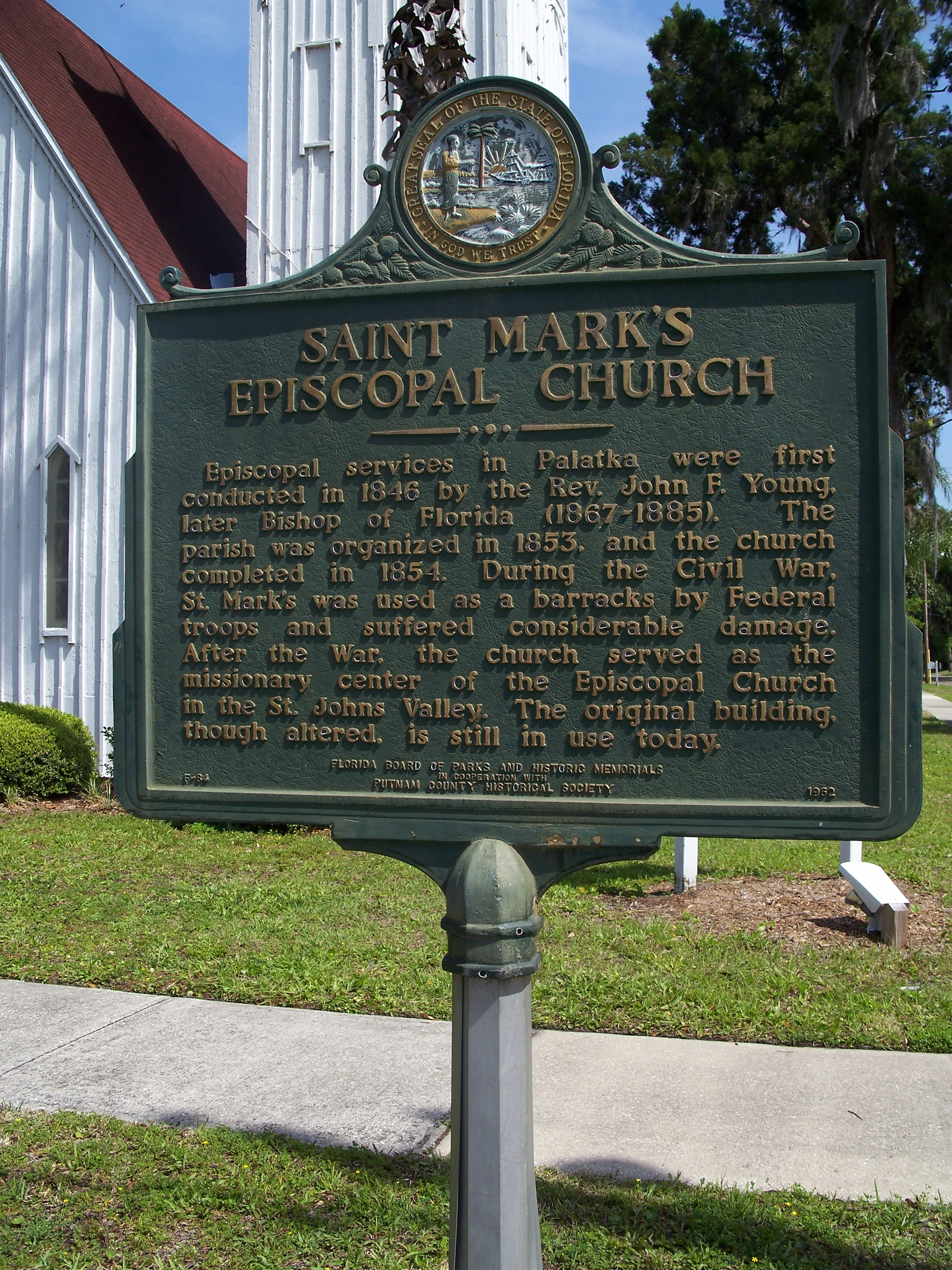

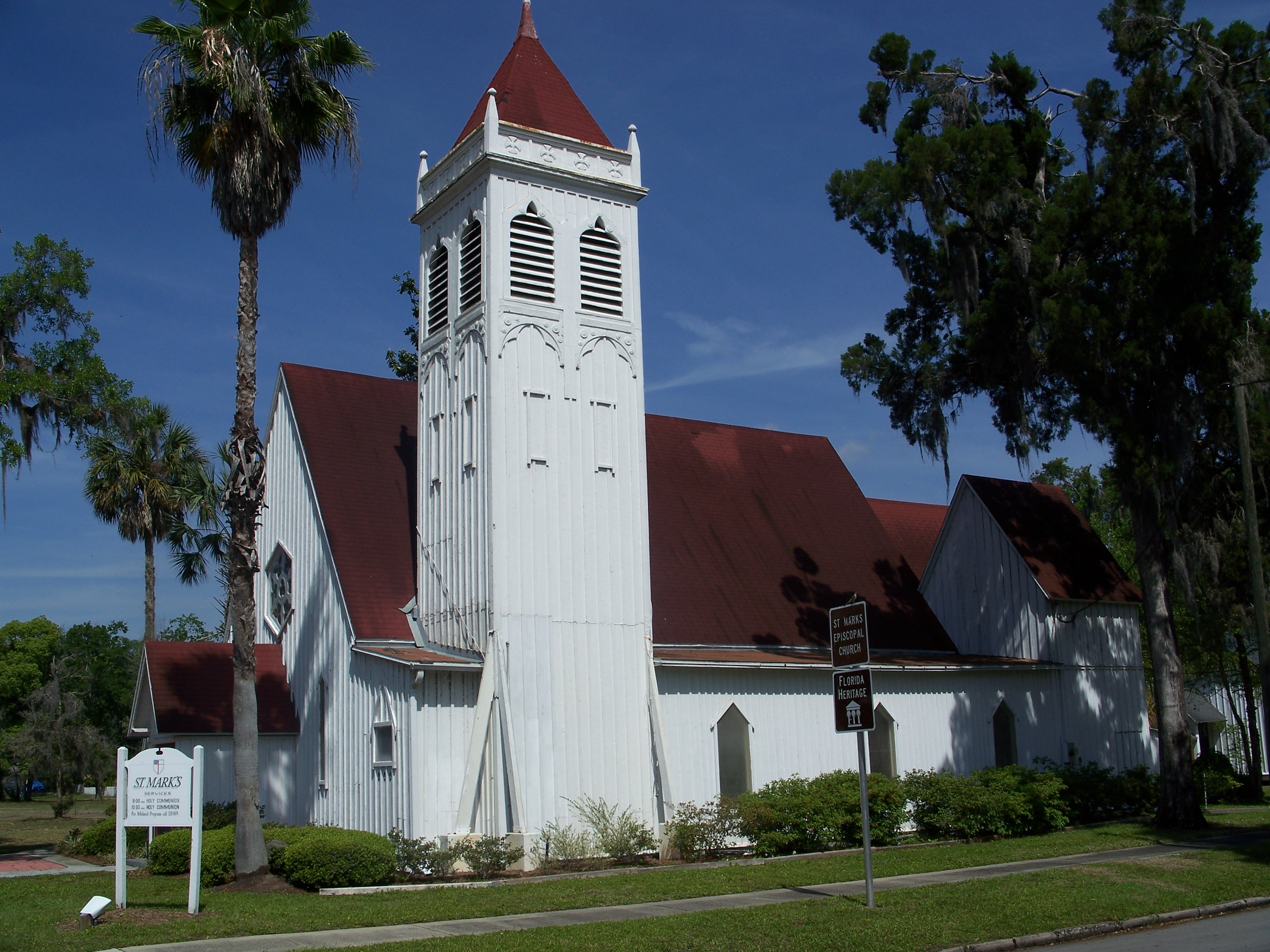

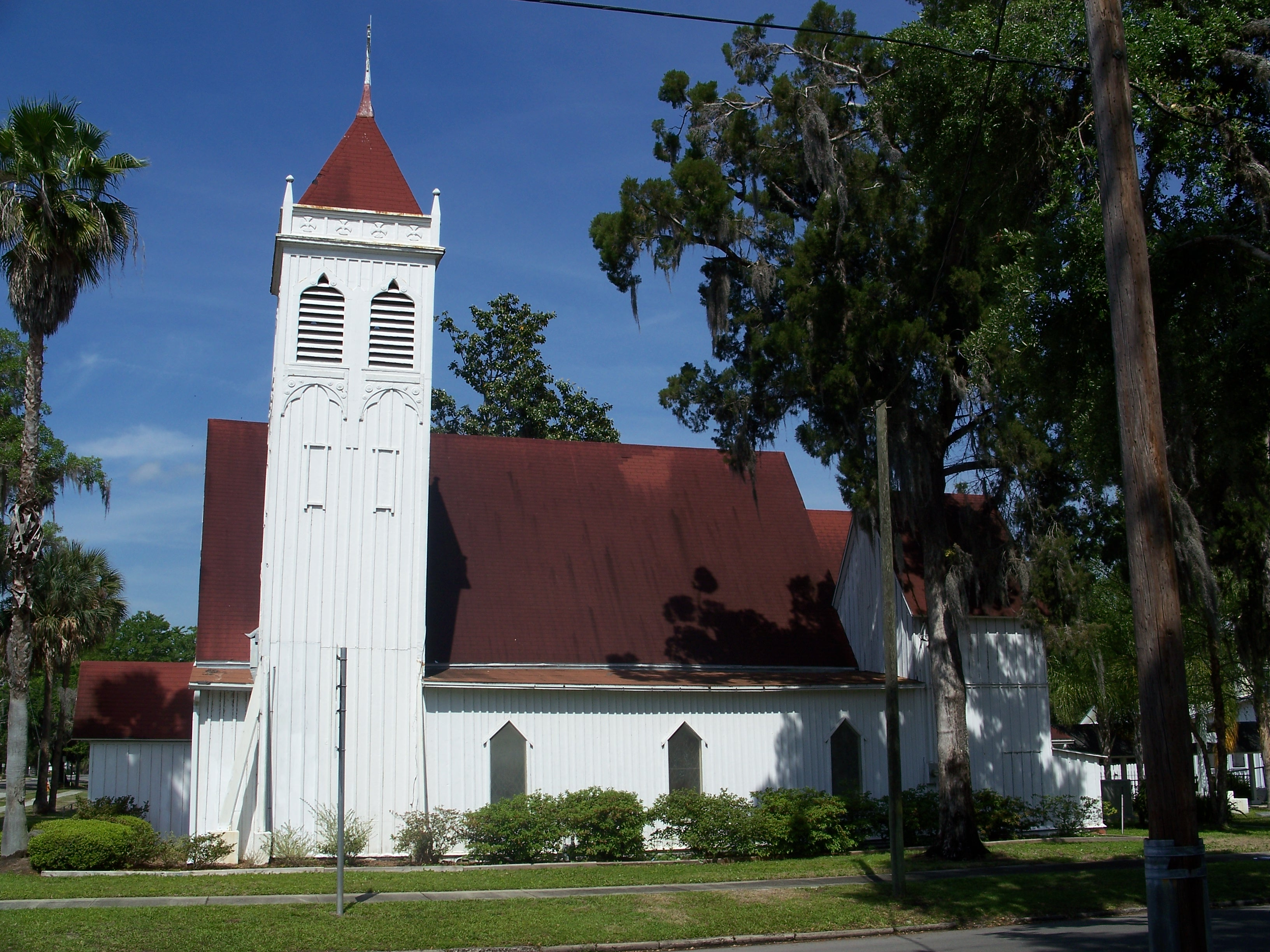

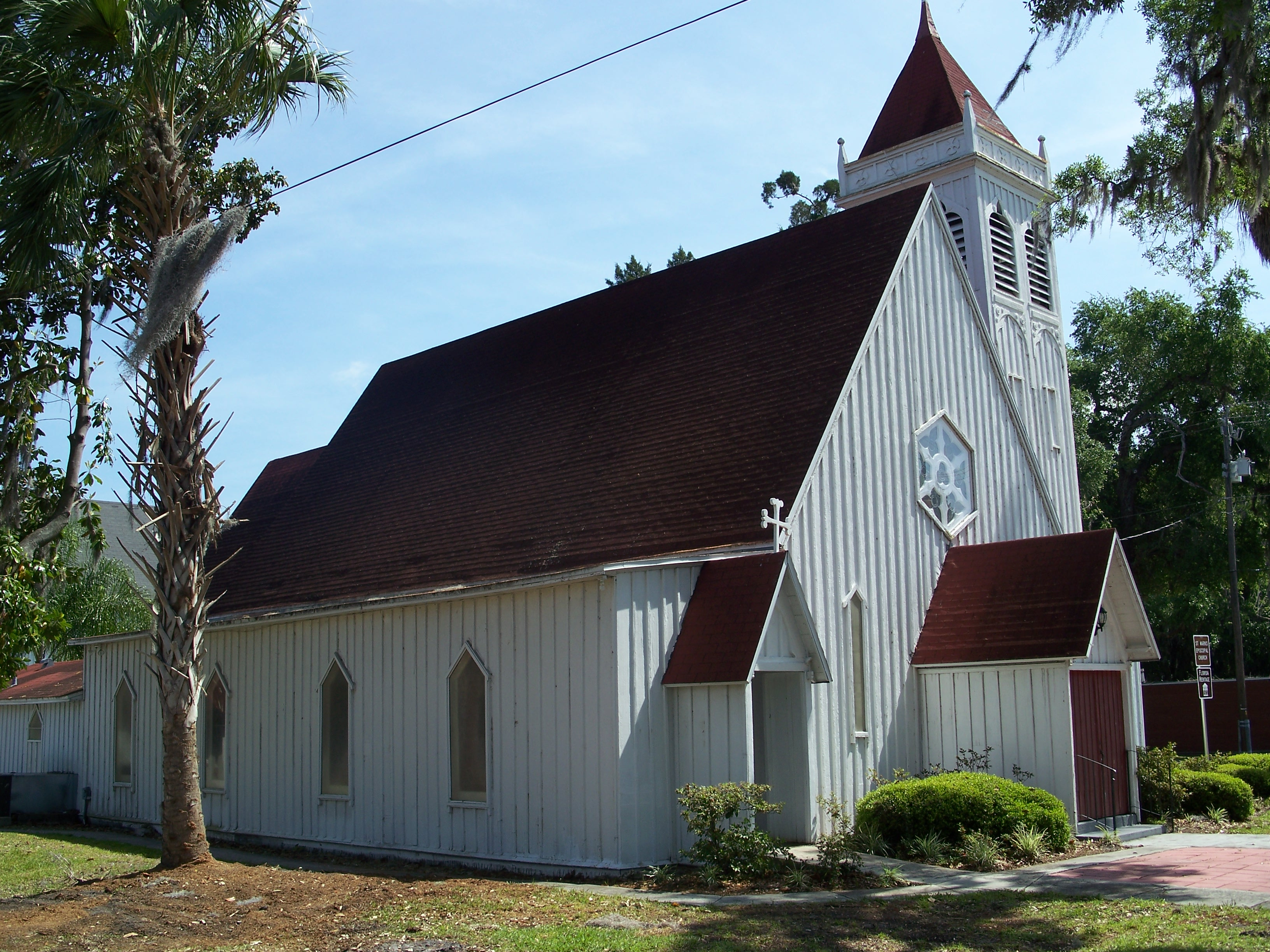

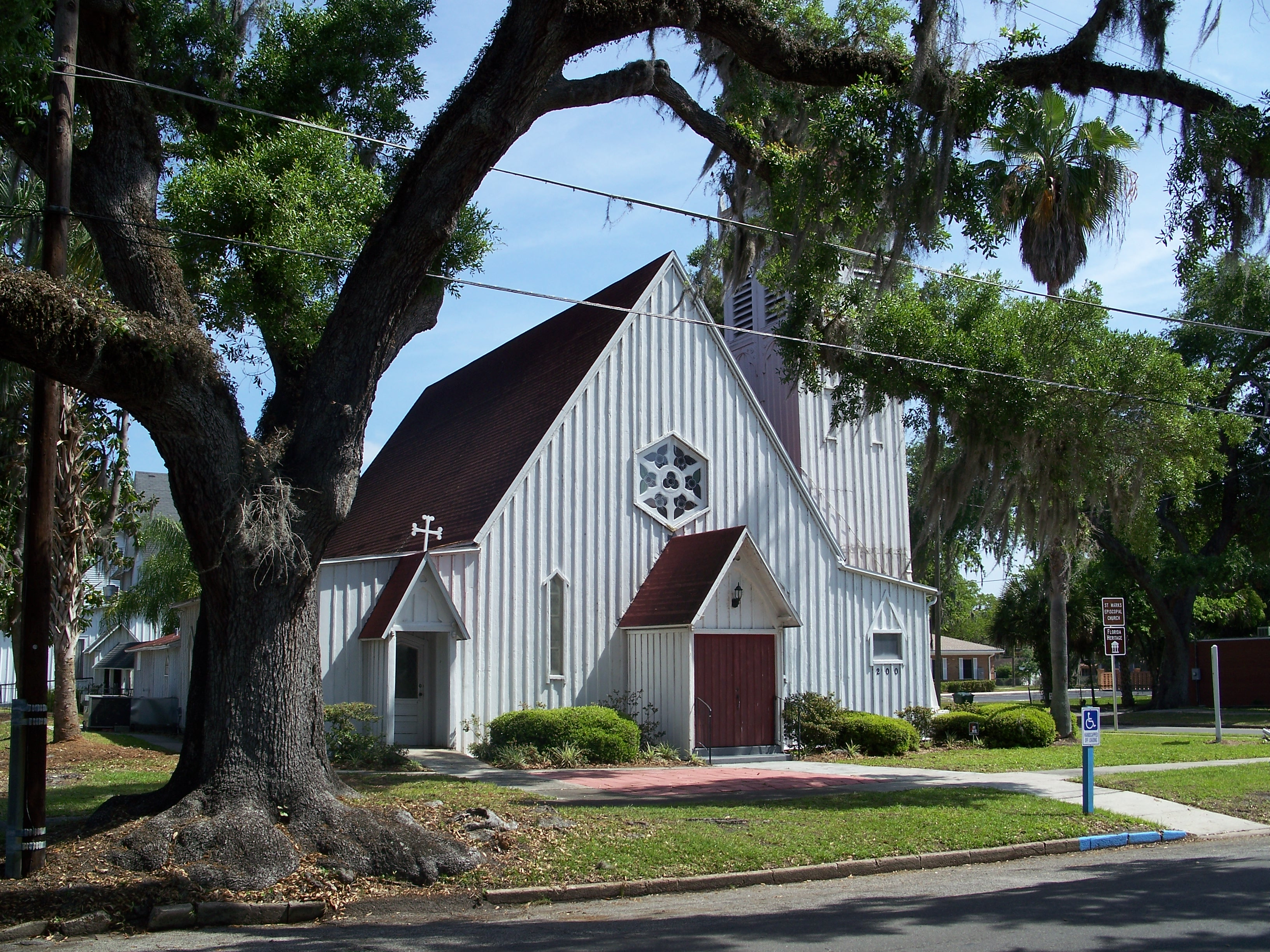

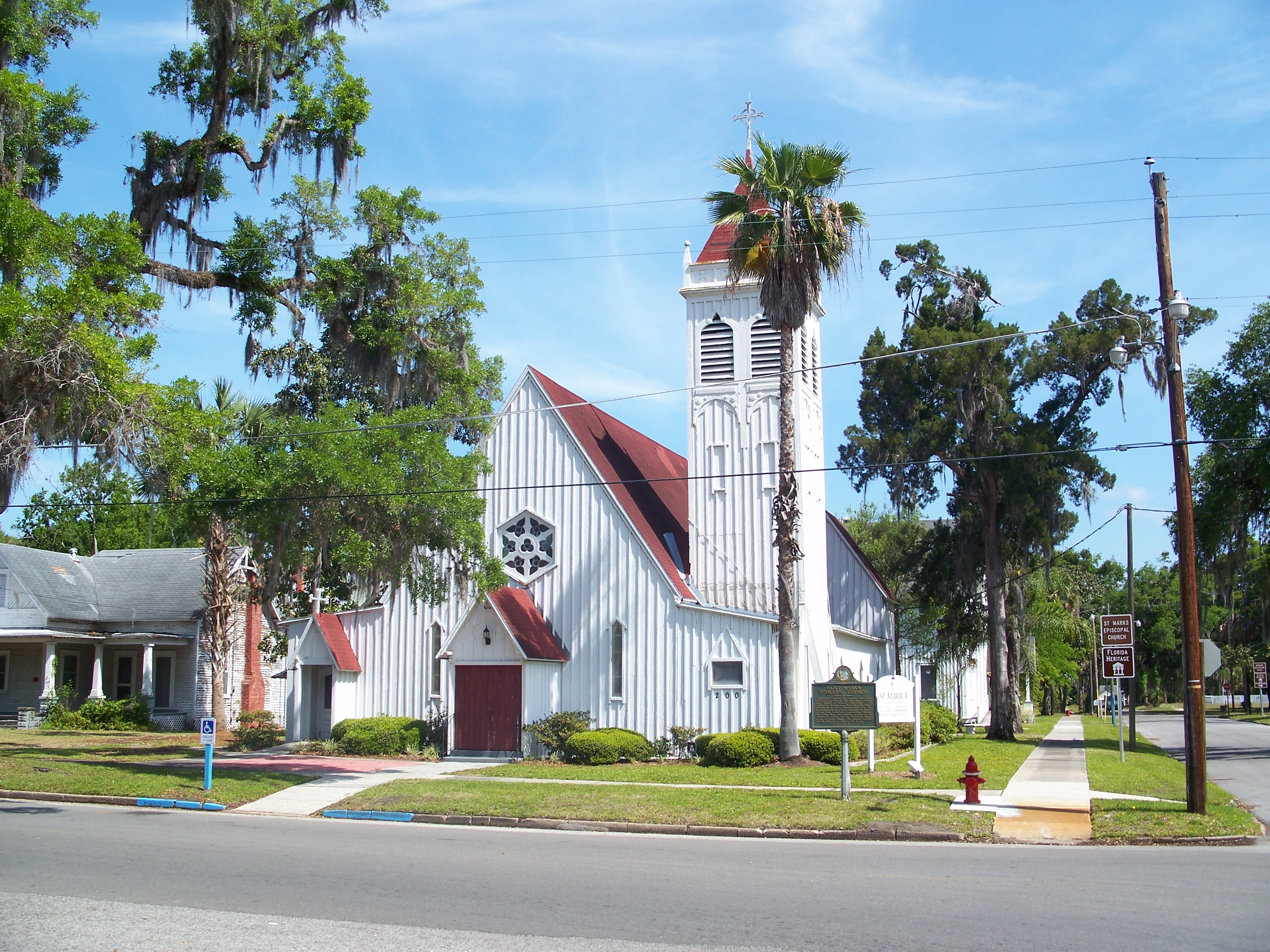

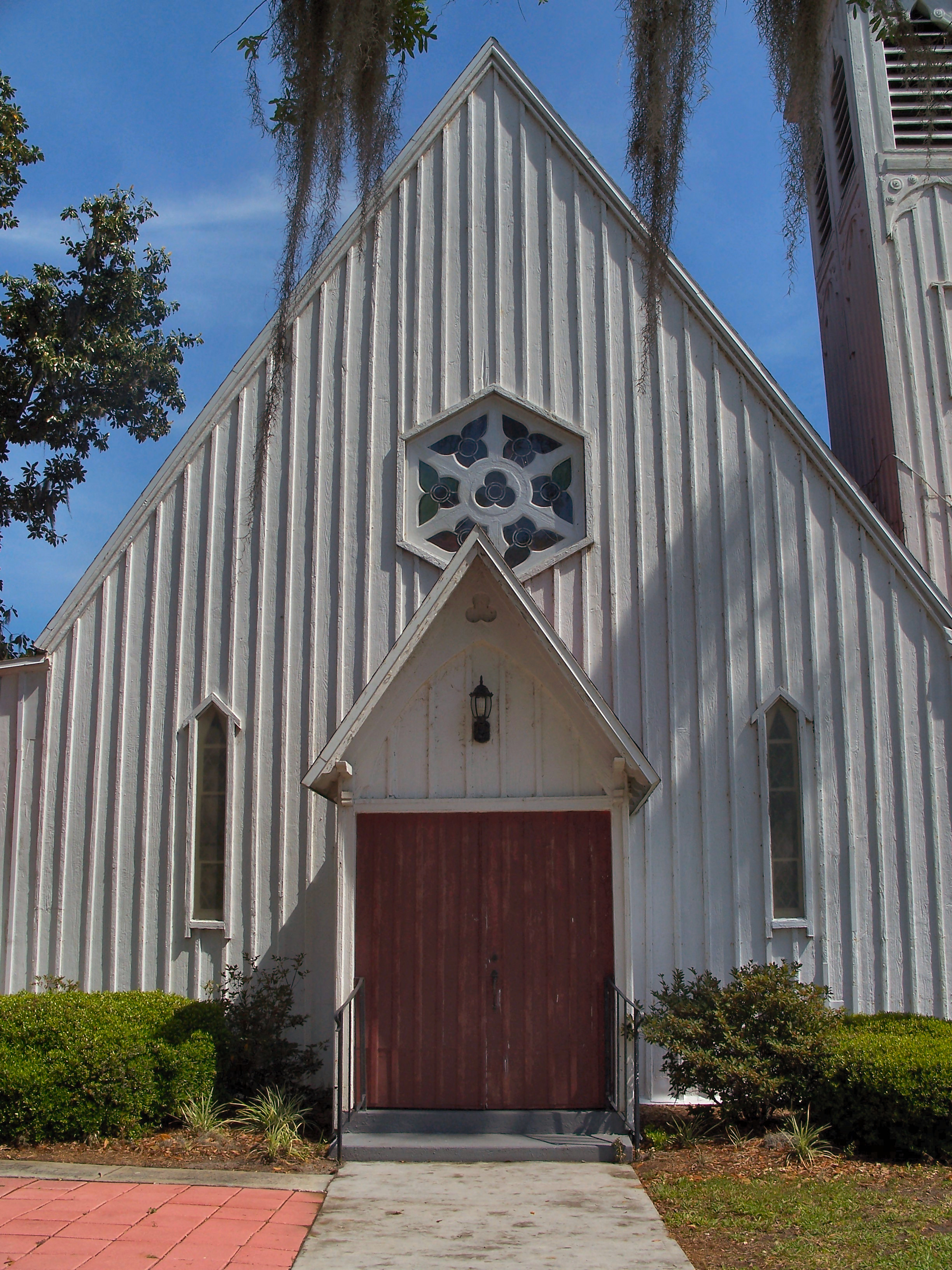

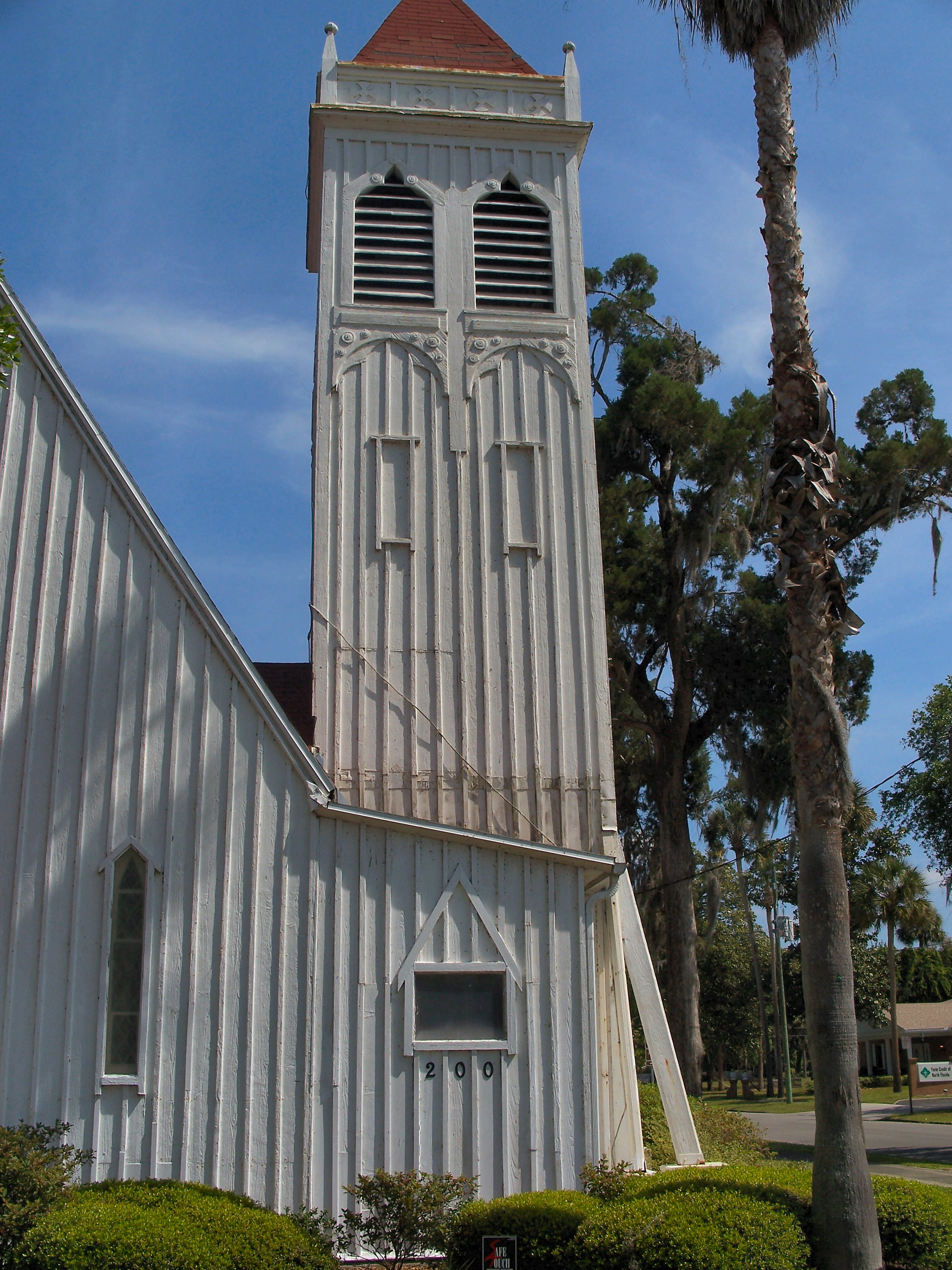

== See also ==
- National Register of Historic Places listings in Florida
- St. Mark's Episcopal Church
