= Palatka Municipal Airport =

Airport in Florida, United States

Palatka Municipal Airport Lt. Kay Larkin Field
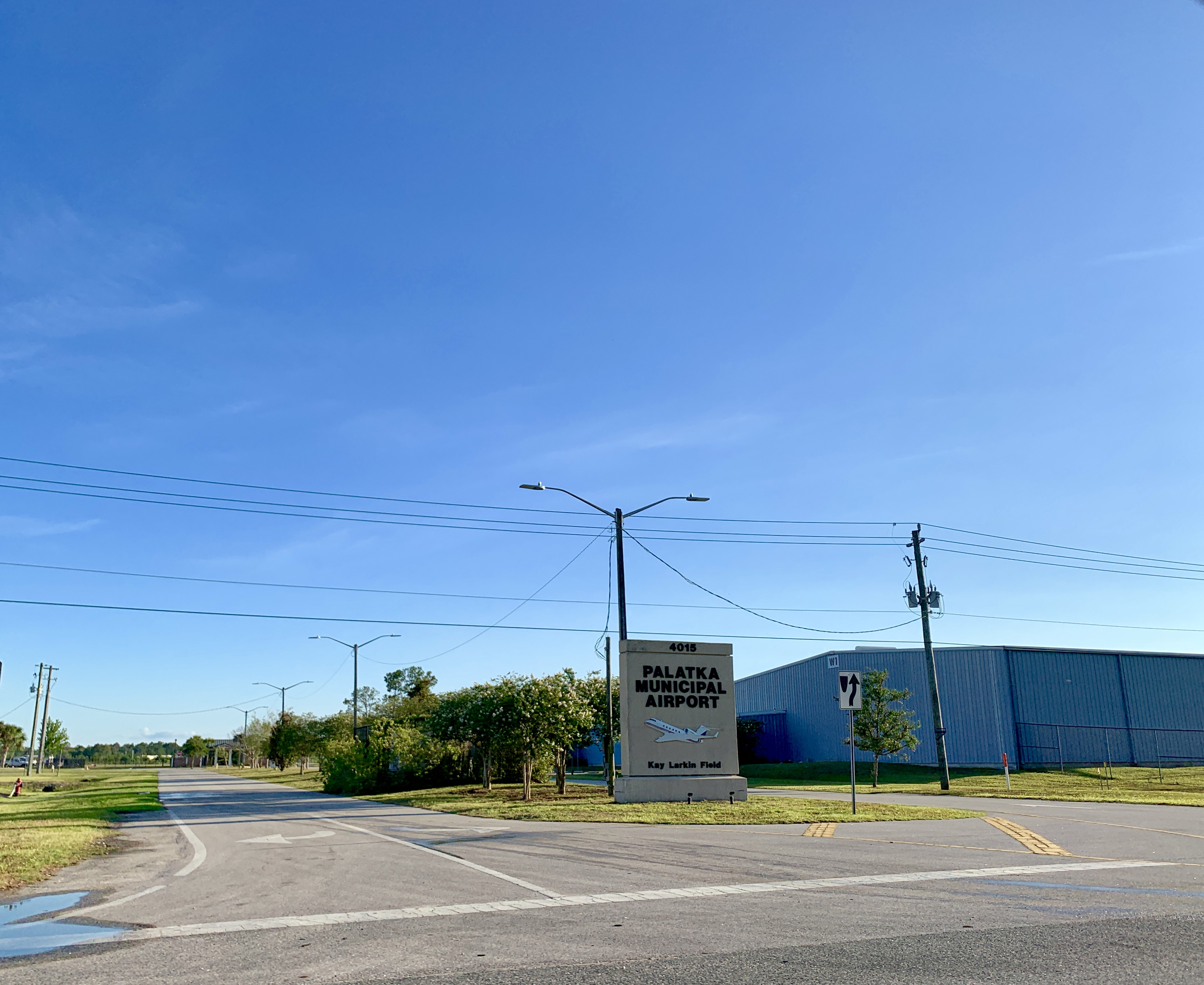
- IATA: none; ICAO: none; FAA LID: 28J

Summary
- Airport type: Public
- Owner: City of Palatka
- Serves: Palatka, Florida
- Elevation AMSL: 48 ft / 15 m
- Coordinates: 29°39′30″N 081°41′22″W
- Website: PalatkaKayLarkin.com

Map
- Location of airport in Florida 28J (the United States)

Runways
Direction	Length		Surface
Direction	ft	m	Surface
9/27	6,000	1,829	Asphalt
17/35	3,510	1,070	Asphalt

Statistics (2018)
- Aircraft operations (year ending 2/9/2018): 37,186
- Based aircraft: 66
- Source: Federal Aviation Administration

Palatka Municipal Airport (FAA LID: 28J), also known as Lieutenant Kay Larkin Field, is a city-owned, public-use airport located two nautical miles (4 km) northwest of the central business district of Palatka, a city in Putnam County, Florida, United States. It is included in the National Plan of Integrated Airport Systems for 2011–2015, which categorized it as a general aviation facility.

== History ==
Palatka Municipal Airport was founded in 1938 with 214 acres (0.87 km^{2}). On June 1, 1942, the U.S. Navy, under a government lease, acquired the airport from the City of Palatka, and in 1943, acquired additional land in support of naval air training operations, primarily U.S. Navy and U.S. Marine Corps F4U Corsair fighter training, under the cognizance of the Naval Air Station Jacksonville complex to the north. On August 21, 1942, the airport was officially named Kay Larkin Field for 1st Lieutenant J. K. "Kay" Larkin, a U.S. Army Air Forces instructor pilot and Palatka native killed during the Second World War. In 1946, the War Assets Administration turned the airport back over to the City of Palatka.

In the early 1960s, it appeared likely that commercial air service would be initiated in the Palatka area. To accommodate this service, a terminal building of approximately 1,400 square feet (130 m^{2}) was constructed and dedicated in January 1963. In September 1963, South Central Airlines started servicing Palatka and the Central Florida area and continued for approximately two years, discontinuing service in 1965. That terminal building remains in operation today, primarily in support of general aviation operations. Shortly following discontinuance of commercial air service, the city leased operation to outside fixed-base operators (FBOs), but resumed complete operation in the early 1980s. In 2010, the city opened a new 4,000 sq ft (370 m^{2}) terminal building.

== Facilities and aircraft ==
Palatka Municipal Airport covers an area of 703 acres (284 ha) at an elevation of 48 feet (15 m) above mean sea level. It has two asphalt paved runways: 9/27 is 6,000 by 100 feet (1,829 x 30 m); 17/35 is 3,510 by 75 feet (1,070 x 23 m).

For the 12-month period ending February 9, 2018, the airport had 37,186 aircraft operations, an average of 102 per day: 98% general aviation, 1% military, and <1% air taxi. At that time there were 66 aircraft based at this airport: 61 single-engine, 4 multi-engine, and 1 jet.

== See also ==
- List of airports in Florida
