= St. Johns River State College =

Public college in Northeast Florida, US

- Former name: St. Johns River Community College
- Type: Public college
- Established: 1958; 68 years ago
- Parent institution: Florida College System
- Academic affiliations: Southern Association of Colleges and Schools, Florida College System
- Chairman: Rich Komando, J.D., Chair
- President: Joe Pickens
- Faculty: 109
- Students: 10,514 (2017)
- Location: Palatka, Florida, U.S.
- Campus: Palatka campus 93 acres (38 ha) St. Augustine campus 165.2 acres (66.9 ha) Orange Park campus 95.68 acres (38.72 ha) Total: 353.88 acres (1.4321 km^{2})
- Sporting affiliations: NJCAA
- Mascot: Vikings
- Website: www.sjrstate.edu

St. Johns River State College is a public college in Northeast Florida, United States, with campuses in Palatka, St. Augustine, and Orange Park. Established in 1958; opened for organizational purposes February 25th,1958 as St. Johns River Junior College is part of the Florida College System. It is one of several colleges in the system designated in 2011 as a "state college", meaning they can offer more bachelor degrees and academic programs than traditional community colleges.

The college is accredited by the Southern Association of Colleges and Schools. Florida School of the Arts, Florida's first state-sponsored arts school, is housed within the Palatka campus.

== History ==
The first president of the college, Dr. B. R. Tilley, was appointed in 1958 and the college opened its doors later that year, in the fall of 1958. Classes were held in the educational buildings of First Baptist Church of Palatka and 191 students began the fall semester of 1958.

Collier-Blocker Junior College, a historically black college, also based in Palatka opened its doors in 1960 with initial classes starting in Shiloh Baptist Church with 59 students. In 1964 the two educational institutions merged under the name of St. Johns River. But none of the faculty and few of the Black students of Collier-Blocker found places at St. Johns River.

Between 1966 and 2011, it changed its name to St. Johns River Community College. During this period, the college also expanded its programs, developing campuses in Orange Park and St. Augustine in 1977 and 1986, respectively, in order to better serve Putnam, St. Johns, and Clay counties.

In 2011 it was designated as a state college, which enabled it to offer more programs culminating in bachelor's degrees.

Dr Robert L. McLendon Jr. served as president of the college from 1972 to 2008, and led much of its development. The Thrasher-Horne Center for Performing Arts opened on the Orange Park campus in 2004.

He was succeeded by the current president of the college, Joe Pickens. In 2012, the college created a wall featuring portraits of students and faculty, and other mementos of Collier-Blocker. A state scholarship was also established in the name of the former Black college.

== Florida School of the Arts ==
Florida School of the Arts (FloArts) is he first state-supported professional arts school for high school and college student in Florida. Full operation began in August 1976, with 51 students. Florida School of the Arts is an accredited arts school under the umbrella of St. Johns River State College. It is located in the F building of the Palatka Campus. Florida School of the Arts was designed to be an intimate setting where students received close and individual attention. Florida School of the Arts offers course concentrations with accredited Associate in Science and Associate in Arts degrees in the fields of Visual Art (Animation, Studio Art, Graphic Design/New Media, Photography), Acting, Dance, Musical Theatre, and Theatre Production/Design (Costume Design, Scenic/Lighting Design, Stage Management). Florida School of the Arts also offers bachelors degrees in Digital Art and Media and Performance Design and Production.

== Campus locations ==
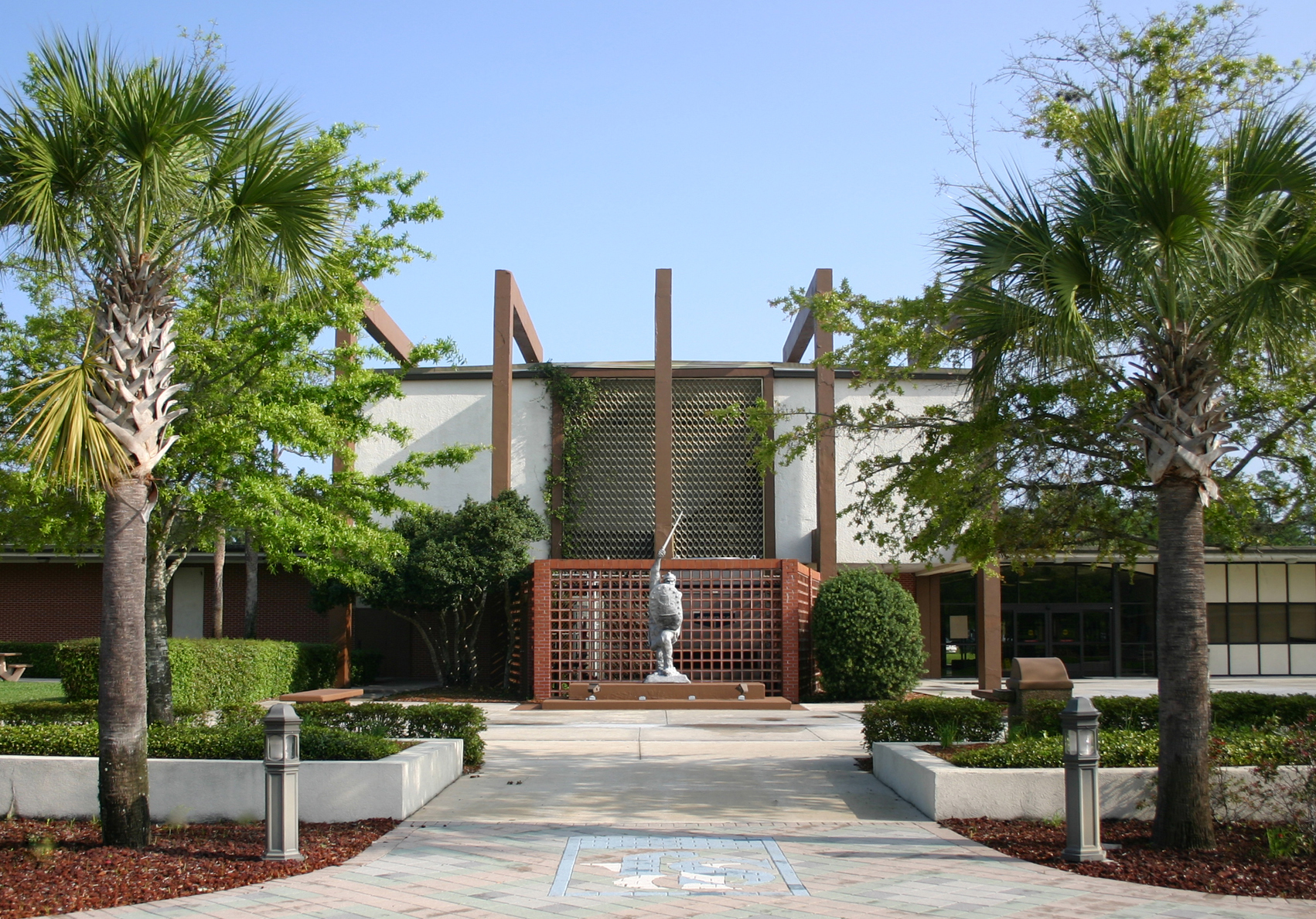
Student Center at Palatka Campus

- Palatka Campus (Putnam County)
- St. Augustine Campus (St. Johns County)
- Orange Park Campus (Clay County)
- Florida School of the Arts (Palatka Campus)

== Notable alumni and attendees ==
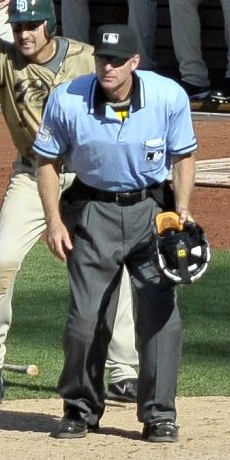
Ed Hickox

| Alumni | Notability |
|---|---|
| Lenny Curry | Former Mayor of Jacksonville, FL |
| Ed Hickox | Former Major League Baseball umpire |
| Howie Kendrick | Former Major League Baseball second baseman |
| Nathaniel Lowe | Current Major League Baseball first baseman |
| Myles Straw | Current Major League Baseball outfielder |
| Lake Ray | Former member of the Florida House of Representatives |
| Bill Swaggerty | Former Major League Baseball pitcher |
| Rick Surhoff | Former Major League Baseball pitcher |
| Pat McMahon | Former College Baseball coach at Mississippi State and Florida |
