= Palatka, Florida =

City in the United States

- City
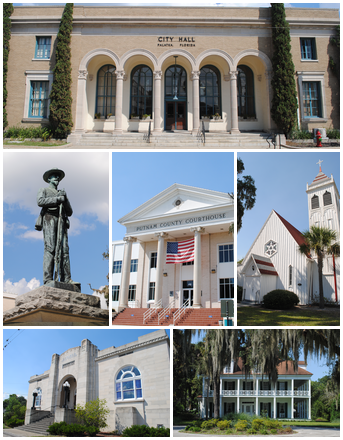
- Images top, left to right: City Hall, Confederate Memorial, Putnam County Courthouse, St. Mark's Episcopal Church, Larimer Memorial Library, Bronson-Mulholland House

- Seal
- Nickname: P-Town
- Location in Putnam County and the state of Florida
- Coordinates: 29°38′22″N 81°39′45″W
- Country: United States
- State: Florida
- County: Putnam
- Settled: 1821
- Incorporated: January 8, 1853

Government
  - Type: Commission-Manager

Area
  - Total: 9.76 sq mi (25.27 km^{2})
  - Land: 9.76 sq mi (25.27 km^{2})
  - Water: 0 sq mi (0.00 km^{2}) 7.70%
  - Micropolitan: 827 sq mi (2,142 km^{2})
- Elevation: 23 ft (7.0 m)

Population (2020)
  - Total: 10,446
  - Density: 1,070.6/sq mi (413.36/km^{2})
  - Micropolitan: 72,893
- Time zone: UTC-5 (EST)
  - Summer (DST): UTC-4 (EDT)
- ZIP codes: 32177-32178
- Area code: 386
- FIPS code: 12-53875
- GNIS feature ID: 2404461
- Website: palatka-fl.gov

Palatka (/pəˈlætkə/) is a city in and the county seat of Putnam County, Florida, United States. Palatka is the principal city of the Palatka Micropolitan Statistical Area, which is home to 72,893 residents. The Palatka micropolitan area is included in the Jacksonville–Kingsland–Palatka, FL-GA Combined Statistical Area.

The city is the location of the St. Johns River State College, St. Johns River Water Management District Headquarters, and Ravine Gardens State Park. Local festivals include the Florida Azalea Festival and the Blue Crab Festival. The population was 10,446 at the 2020 census, down from 10,558 at the 2010 census.

== History ==
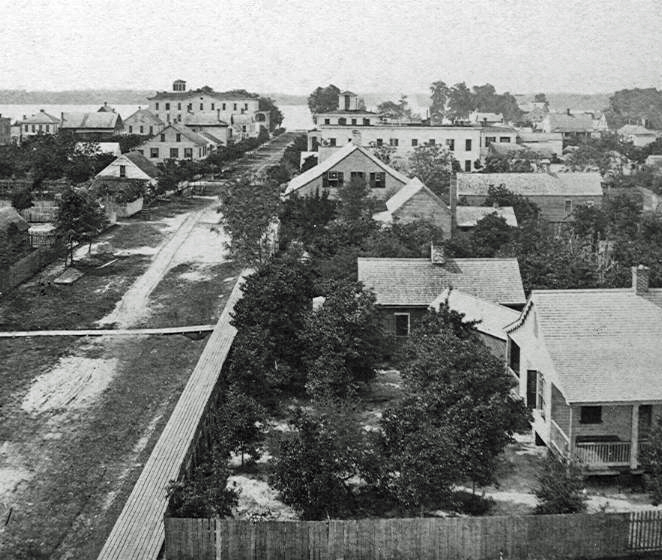
Palatka c. 1880

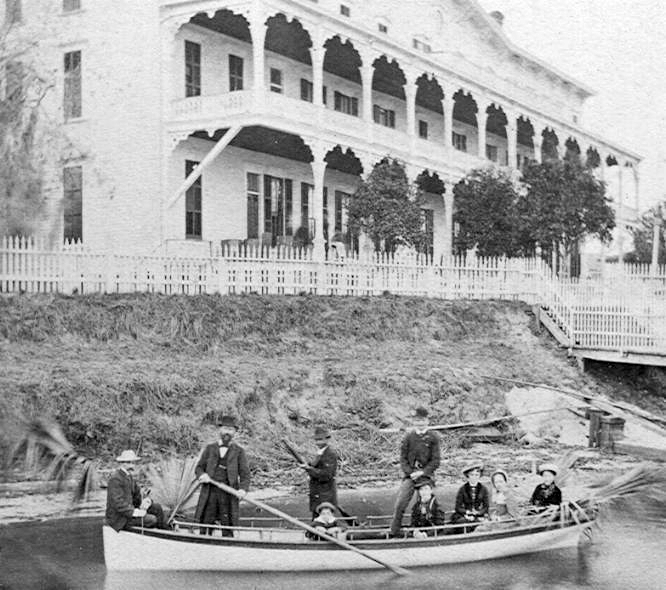
Larkin House c. 1880

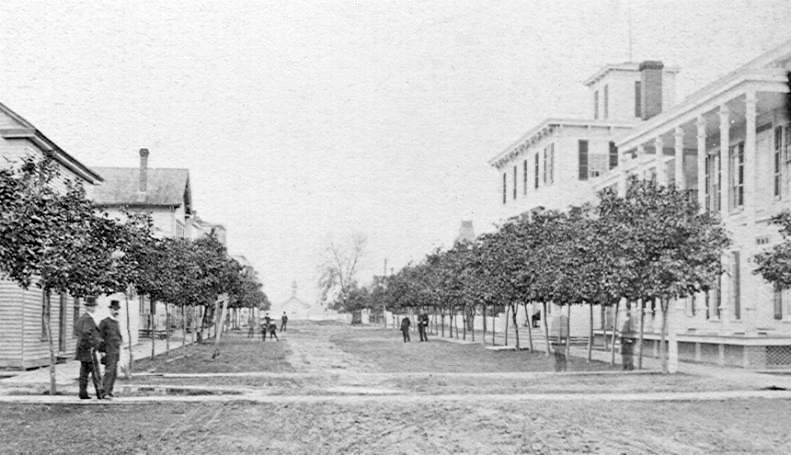
Second Street c. 1880

The area was once the domain of the Timucuan peoples, two tribes of which existed in the Palatka region under chiefs Saturiwa and Utina. They fished bass and mullet, or hunted deer, turkeys, bear and opossum. Others farmed beans, corn, melons, squash, and tobacco. However, infectious disease that came with European contact and war devastated the tribes, and they were extinct as organized peoples by the mid-18th century. Some of their survivors merged with other tribes; other Timucua evacuated with the Spanish to Cuba in 1763, when Spain ceded Florida to Great Britain in an exchange of interests after the latter's defeat of France in the Seven Years' War.

During the late eighteenth century, Creek (Muscogee) tribes made their way to Florida. In a process of ethnogenesis, they joined with other Native Americans and the Seminole tribe emerged. They called the location Pilo-taikita, meaning "crossing over" or "cows' crossing". Here the St. Johns River narrows and begins a shallower, winding course upstream to Lake George and Lake Monroe.

=== Rollestown ===
In 1767, Denys Rolle (1725–1797), an English gentleman and philanthropist, established Rollestown on the east bank of the St. Johns River, at the head of deepwater navigation. His 78,000-acre (320 km^{2}) plantation was a commercial experiment. He recruited settlers off the streets of London to serve as indentured servant/workers: they included paupers, vagrants, pickpockets and "penitent prostitutes". He paid for their passage and if they survived the term of indenture, they could receive land. Some two hundred indentured servants arrived to clear wilderness for agriculture and livestock. Unaccustomed to such physical labor and a subtropical climate, however, most left.

Next Rolle purchased enslaved Africans taken captive in West Africa. He used them as workers to tend livestock, such as chickens, hogs, goats and sheep, or cultivate and process cotton, indigo, citrus and turpentine for export to Europe.

He built a mansion and laid out a village, but trouble beleaguered his "ideal society". In 1770, a disgruntled overseer sold more than 1,000 of his employer's cattle and disappeared with the money. Rolle hired new overseers and bought more slaves, but the plantation failed to prosper.

When Britain agreed to end the American Revolutionary War in 1783, it also returned Florida to Spain. Rolle then abandoned the colony and chartered a ship to carry his household belongings, livestock and slaves to a 2,000-acre (8.1 km^{2}) estate on Great Exuma in the Bahamas. This point of land, in East Palatka, is still called Rollestown.

With the changes by different European nations in Florida, there were changes in claims in Pilo-taikita, now contracted to Pilatka. In 1774, naturalist William Bartram noted an Indian village on the west bank, but it was later abandoned.

=== American Territory ===
In 1821, Spain transferred Florida to the United States following the Adams–Onís Treaty, and the current community of Palatka can be traced to a European-American settlement established shortly thereafter. Nehemiah Brush bought a 1,200-acre (4.9 km^{2}) tract in 1826 and another of equal size the next year, and established a ferry across the river in 1834. The ferry landing and related site became a distribution point for commerce with the interior of the state. A New York company shipped goods from here to supply immigrants at the Spanish land grant of Arredondo, which lay due west, primarily in Alachua County.

The arrival of land-hungry European-American settlers created confrontations with the resident Seminole. When the government attempted to relocate the tribe to the west of the Mississippi as part of Indian Removal starting in 1833, the Second Seminole War began. The Seminole attacked and burned Pilatka in 1835.

Recognizing the site's strategic importance for control of the St. Johns River, the main artery into Central Florida, the US Army in 1838 established Fort Shannon, named for Captain Samuel Shannon. It included a garrison, supply depot and hospital. By 1842 most of the Seminole had moved to Indian Territory, and Fort Shannon was abandoned by the army in 1843.

Settlers made use of the military piers and buildings, including eight blockhouses, to develop the town. By 1847, it was growing rapidly. In 1849, Putnam County was created, with Pilatka the county seat. With the help of Judge Isaac H. Bronson, it was incorporated as a city on January 8, 1853.

During the 1850s, Florida in general and Pilatka in particular gained a reputation as a seasonal haven for invalids and others escaping severe northern winters. Steamboats carried them up the St. John's River in increasing numbers. One visitor wrote that amusements included "sailing, fishing, rowing, walking, riding in buggies and on horseback, whist, euchre, backgammon and hunting".

=== American Civil War ===
The tourist trend was interrupted by the Civil War, when gunboats cruised the waters. Pilatka was destitute and largely deserted. On October 7, 1862, the USS Cimarron fired several shells over the town after seeing some Confederate cavalry. Mary Boyd pleaded with Union Commander Maxwell Woodhull to spare Pilatka, assuring him that the horse soldiers were not residents. He complied.

Among the notable residents of Pilatka during the war were Confederate spy Lola Sánchez and her sisters. Sánchez became upset when their father was falsely accused of being a Confederate spy and imprisoned by Union Army soldiers. Union officers took over their house in Palatka. On one occasion Sánchez overheard various officers’ planning a raid and alerted the Confederates forces.

Confederate forces, led by Capt. John Jackson Dickison, surprised and captured the Union troops on the day of the supposed raid in what is known as the Battle of Horse Landing.

=== Postbellum ===
Following the war, the tourists returned. New accommodations were constructed including the Putnam House, built by Hubbard L. Hart, and the Larkin House, which could hold 250 guests. Steamers ran up the Ocklawaha River to Eustis, Leesburg and Silver Springs, or along the St. Johns River to Enterprise and Sanford. Industries included logging, raising cattle and hogs, and orange groves. On May 24, 1875, the post office changed the spelling to Palatka.

By the 1880s, several competing railroads crossed the community, which became an important junction. On the west bank of the St. Johns these included the Florida Southern Railway, the Jacksonville, Tampa and Key West Railroad, and the Georgia Southern and Florida Railroad. East of the river, the original routing of the Florida East Coast Railway's main line between St. Augustine and Bunnell passed through East Palatka and a railroad bridge in Palatka provided for a connection to the railroads on the western bank.

On November 7, 1884, Palatka suffered a devastating fire. When tourists arrived that season, most accommodations had been lost. They continued on trains south; this was the beginning of a gradual shift of tourism elsewhere. The city lost trade, shipping and transportation preeminence to Jacksonville, on the coast. But with its downtown rebuilt in brick to be fireproof, Palatka emerged a finer place.

In 1893, A. E. and H. S. Wilson of Saginaw, Michigan bought the Noah J. Tilghman & Son sawmill, which processed cypress lumber. Renamed the Wilson Cypress Company, it expanded operations and became a major employer. At its peak, it was the second-largest cypress mill in the world. It closed in 1944, as the timber industry moved out of the area.

The Great Freeze of 1894 and 1895 destroyed Palatka's citrus groves for five years. Formerly they had been both a tourist attraction and important sector of the economy. The ill-fated Cross Florida Barge Canal was once intended to pass the city. Today, tourism remains important.

== Geography ==
The total area is 7.5 square miles (19 km^{2}). The city is located in the southern portion of the Lower St. Johns River basin.

=== Climate ===
Palatka has a humid subtropical climate, Köppen climate classification Cfa. The area's warm and humid climate is caused primarily by its proximity to the Gulf Stream, which flows off the east coast of Florida. There are two major seasons which characterize the area. One is hot and rainy, lasting from June until late September. The other is the dry season, October through May, which brings more moderate temperatures and less frequent rainfall.

Climate data for Palatka, Florida (1922–2004)
Month	Jan	Feb	Mar	Apr	May	Jun	Jul	Aug	Sep	Oct	Nov	Dec	Year
Record high °F (°C)	90 (32)	90 (32)	94 (34)	96 (36)	103 (39)	105 (41)	103 (39)	102 (39)	100 (38)	98 (37)	90 (32)	86 (30)	105 (41)
Mean daily maximum °F (°C)	69.4 (20.8)	72.0 (22.2)	77.3 (25.2)	82.8 (28.2)	88.0 (31.1)	91.2 (32.9)	92.4 (33.6)	92.1 (33.4)	88.9 (31.6)	82.9 (28.3)	75.8 (24.3)	70.5 (21.4)	81.9 (27.8)
Daily mean °F (°C)	57.9 (14.4)	59.9 (15.5)	64.9 (18.3)	70.5 (21.4)	76.3 (24.6)	80.8 (27.1)	82.4 (28.0)	82.3 (27.9)	79.8 (26.6)	72.9 (22.7)	64.5 (18.1)	59.2 (15.1)	71.0 (21.6)
Mean daily minimum °F (°C)	45.7 (7.6)	47.8 (8.8)	52.6 (11.4)	58.3 (14.6)	64.6 (18.1)	70.6 (21.4)	72.4 (22.4)	72.5 (22.5)	70.7 (21.5)	62.8 (17.1)	53.1 (11.7)	47.9 (8.8)	59.9 (15.5)
Record low °F (°C)	11 (−12)	21 (−6)	21 (−6)	35 (2)	43 (6)	55 (13)	60 (16)	62 (17)	55 (13)	37 (3)	23 (−5)	16 (−9)	11 (−12)
Average precipitation inches (mm)	2.69 (68)	3.19 (81)	3.73 (95)	3.08 (78)	3.61 (92)	6.65 (169)	7.22 (183)	7.10 (180)	7.31 (186)	3.81 (97)	1.94 (49)	2.54 (65)	52.87 (1,343)
Average precipitation days (≥ 0.01 in)	6.7	6.4	6.8	5.4	7.6	12.5	15.0	14.3	12.6	8.4	5.5	6.1	107.3
Source: NOAA

=== Neighborhoods ===
- Downtown
- North Historic District
- South Historic District
- Palatka Heights
- Newtown
- East Palatka

== Demographics ==
Historical population
Census	Pop.	Note	%±
1860	613		—
1870	720		17.5%
1880	1,616		124.4%
1890	3,039		88.1%
1900	3,301		8.6%
1910	3,779		14.5%
1920	5,102		35.0%
1930	6,500		27.4%
1940	7,140		9.8%
1950	9,176		28.5%
1960	11,028		20.2%
1970	9,444		−14.4%
1980	10,175		7.7%
1990	10,201		0.3%
2000	10,033		−1.6%
2010	10,558		5.2%
2020	10,446		−1.1%
U.S. Decennial Census

=== Racial and ethnic composition ===
Palatka racial composition (Hispanics excluded from racial categories) (NH = Non-Hispanic)
Race	Pop 2010	Pop 2020	% 2010	% 2020
White (NH)	4,622	3,963	43.78%	37.94%
Black or African American (NH)	5,200	5,163	49.25%	49.43%
Native American or Alaska Native (NH)	30	45	0.28%	0.43%
Asian (NH)	60	85	0.57%	0.81%
Pacific Islander or Native Hawaiian (NH)	2	2	0.02%	0.02%
Some other race (NH)	17	52	0.16%	0.50%
Two or more races/Multiracial (NH)	144	331	1.36%	3.17%
Hispanic or Latino (any race)	483	805	4.57%	7.71%
Total	10,558	10,446		

=== 2020 census ===
As of the 2020 census, Palatka had a population of 10,446. The median age was 37.9 years. 25.7% of residents were under the age of 18 and 19.9% of residents were 65 years of age or older. For every 100 females there were 82.5 males, and for every 100 females age 18 and over there were 77.8 males age 18 and over.

98.0% of residents lived in urban areas, while 2.0% lived in rural areas.

There were 4,104 households in Palatka, of which 32.1% had children under the age of 18 living in them. Of all households, 25.0% were married-couple households, 20.2% were households with a male householder and no spouse or partner present, and 47.3% were households with a female householder and no spouse or partner present. About 36.3% of all households were made up of individuals and 19.5% had someone living alone who was 65 years of age or older.

There were 4,587 housing units, of which 10.5% were vacant. The homeowner vacancy rate was 3.3% and the rental vacancy rate was 4.6%.

=== 2020 ACS estimates ===
The 2020 ACS 5-year estimates reported 2,088 families residing in the city.

=== 2010 census ===
As of the 2010 census, there were 10,558 people, 4,113 households, and 2,466 families residing in the city.

=== 2000 census ===
As of the census of 2000, there are 10,033 people, 3,880 households, and 2,421 families residing in the city. The population density was 1,442.1 inhabitants per square mile (556.8/km^{2}). There were 4,318 housing units at an average density of 620.7 units per square mile (239.7 units/km^{2}). The racial makeup of the city was 48.93% White, 48.43% African American, 0.16% Native American, 0.44% Asian, 0.01% Pacific Islander, 1.04% from other races, and 1.00% from two or more races. Hispanic or Latino of any race were 2.83% of the population.

In 2000, there were 3,880 households, out of which 31.5% had children under the age of 18 living with them, 34.0% were married couples living together, 24.9% had a female householder with no husband present, and 37.6% are other types of families. 32.7% of all households were made up of individuals, and 16.5% had someone living alone who was 65 years of age or older. The average household size was 2.42 and the average family size was 3.10.

In 2000, in the city, the population was spread out, with 28.6% under the age of 18, 10.1% from 18 to 24, 24.6% from 25 to 44, 19.0% from 45 to 64, and 17.7% who were 65 years of age or older. The median age was 34 years. For every 100 females, there were 81.9 males. For every 100 females age 18 and over, there were 75.8 males.

In 2000, the median income for a household in the city was $18,129, and the median income for a family was $26,076. Males had a median income of $27,716 versus $19,187 for females. The per capita income for the city was $11,351. About 27.9% of families and 33.1% of the population were below the poverty line, including 41.0% of those under age 18 and 19.6% of those age 65 or over.

== Economy ==
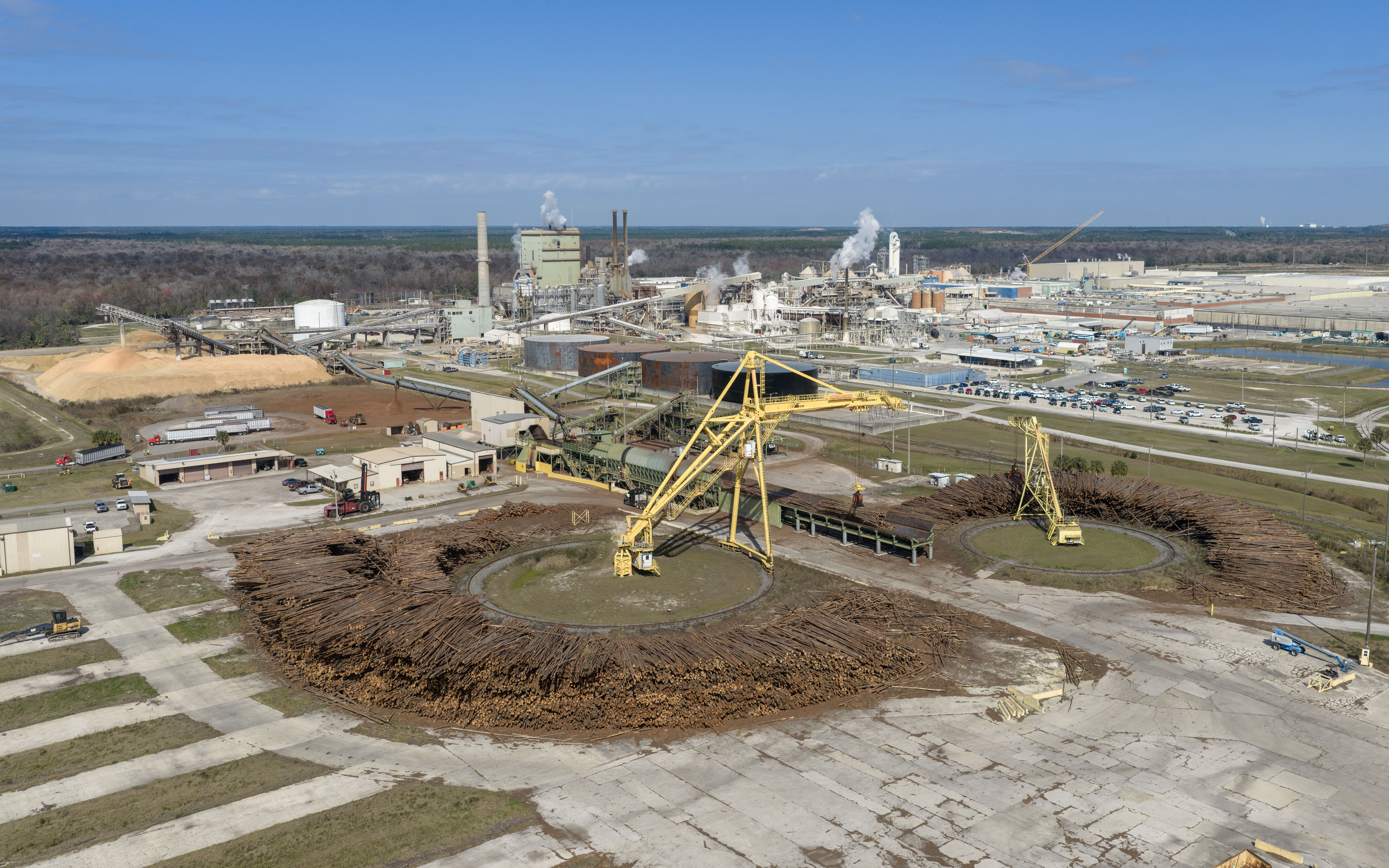
The Georgia-Pacific paper mill is the largest employer in Palatka

The composition of the Palatka area economy is unreflective of Florida as a whole. Unlike many cities in the state, Palatka has a large manufacturing sector, employing 17.2% of the city's total civilian workforce. Comparatively, Florida's statistics indicate 5.9% of the state's entire workforce is employed by the manufacturing sector. Georgia Pacific is the single largest private employer in the city. The firm, a division of Koch, Inc., employs 1,470 people at its pulp, paper, and plywood operations. Veritas Steel is another large manufacturing company operating in Palatka. Their steel fabrication plant (formerly owned by PDM Bridge) is located in Barge Port on the St. Johns River. The Lisle, Illinois-based bridge builder utilizes the river for the transportation of its finished products. This plant is notable for the fabrication of the Woodrow Wilson Bridge structure.

The Palatka area was of early significance in accessing the interior of the state. This significance was due to its location at the end of an expansive portion of waterway at the divide between the upper and lower St. Johns River. First established as a trading outpost, tourism would eventually boom and fuel growth for decades. The decline of waterborne travel in Northeast Florida, and the United States in general, ultimately reduced the importance of tourism in the city. Nowadays, large international airports and bypassing interstate highways carry vacationers to destinations further south. Only 7.1% of Palatka's labor force works in arts, entertainment, recreation, accommodation, and food services, compared to Florida's 15.5% across tourist related industries.

In recent years, the Putnam County government has adopted policies focused on facilitating Ecotourism in the region. Nature trails are being expanded and kayaking waterways have been improved and mapped. Portions of the Florida Trail runs through the area and connect local hiking trails to other trail systems in parks throughout the region. Ocala National Forest is the second largest National Forest in the state. Other large parks include Welaka State Forest, Etoniah Creek State Forest and Dunns Creek State Park. Other conservation areas exist under the management of the Putnam Land Conservancy and St. Johns River Water Management District. Both entities operate regionally and identify and protect ecologically sensitive areas. If progress continues, and ecotourism creates a vibrant local economy, economic incentives could drive further preservation of the natural habitats, benefitting the environment as a whole.

Of residents aged 16 years and over, 53.3% were in the labor force; 45.6% were employed and 7.6% unemployed. Compared to Florida's average, Palatka has a higher percentage of unemployed. Of the same survey, the State's unemployment was 4.6% of the available labor force. The current Florida unemployment rate, published by the U.S. Bureau of Labor Statistics, stands at 7.0%. The Palatka area is bordered on all sides by four separate metropolitan statistical areas. Of those, the Deltona-Daytona Beach-Ormond Beach, Gainesville, and Jacksonville metropolitan statistical areas all had better performing unemployment statistics than Palatka in 2011, when the unemployment rate in the Palatka Micropolitan Statistical Area was 13.8%. Gainesville showed the most favorable conditions with an unemployment rate of 8.7%. Statistics for Palm Coast and Ocala both indicated unemployment rates higher than that of Palatka. Regionally, the employment numbers of Palm Coast have been hit hardest; the bedroom community has an unemployment rate currently at 16.6%.

== Arts and culture ==
=== Cityscape ===
As with many cities in the United States, development has occurred in a radial pattern from the city center to beyond the incorporated area. Due to the historical importance of Palatka as a southeastern interior port, much of the urban development is oriented toward the riverfront. The eastern sections of the city, which include downtown and the historic districts, are characterized by a gridded street system. A significant amount of the original brick roads survive in this area. The western outlying suburban areas are primarily characterized by an amorphous road pattern.

The city of Palatka is actively working toward redevelopment of its riverfront and downtown area.

=== Architecture ===
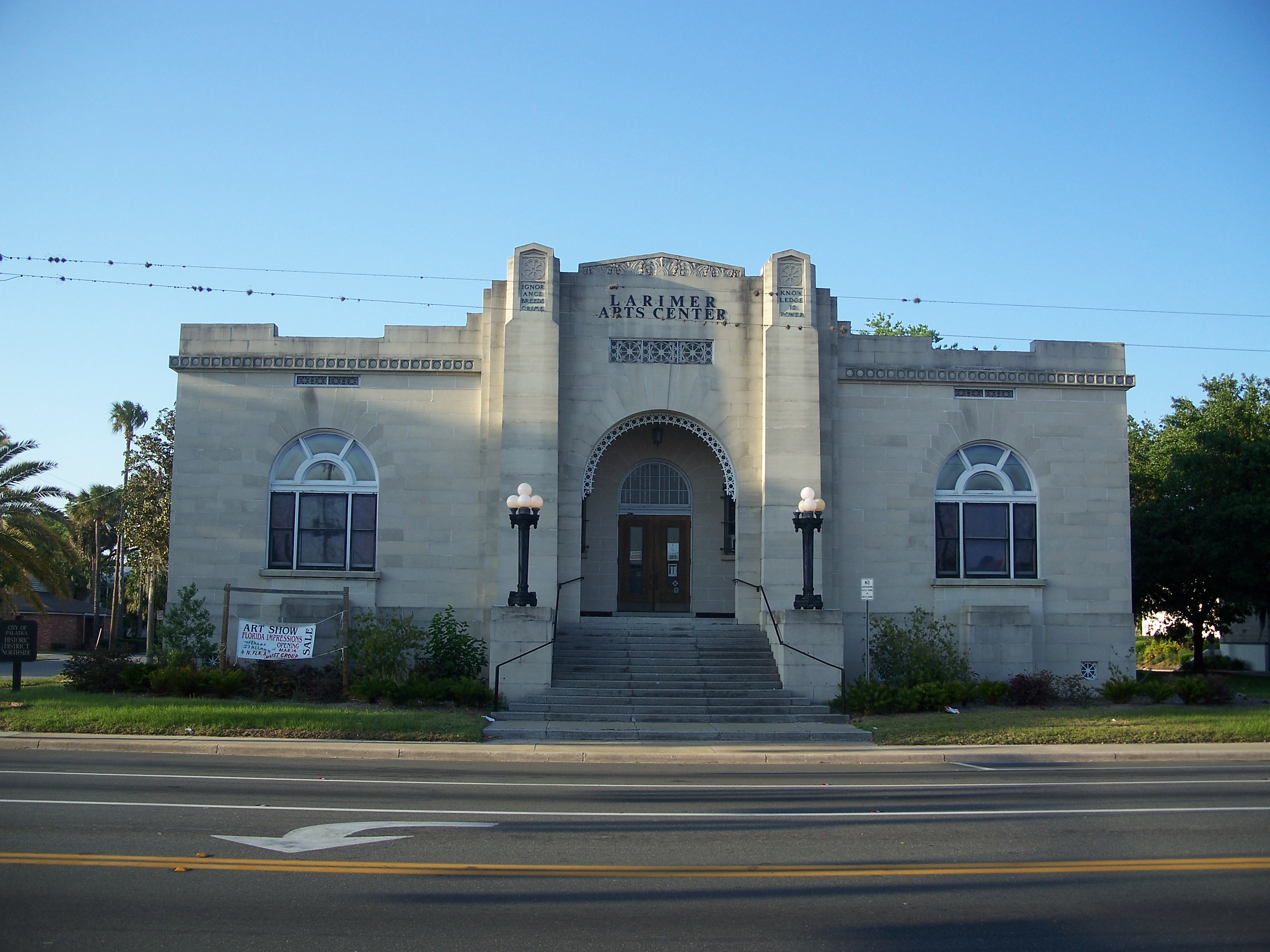
Larimer Memorial Library

Architectural styles represented in the city's historical districts include Victorian, Colonial Revival, Art Deco, Classical Revival, and Prairie School. The James Hotel was designed by architect Henry John Klutho in 1916 in the Prairie School style. Klutho also designed the Larimer Memorial Library, named after the wife of James Ross Mellon, eldest son of Judge Thomas Mellon. The library is a fusion of Prairie School and Art Deco, and is listed on the National Register of Historic Places. Though there are no discernible architectural styles in the outgrowth areas, a notable building technique has been used in the construction of the 23,000-square-foot (2,100 m^{2}) Children's Reading Center Charter School. Five monolithic dome structures crown the facility and give it a distinct style.

=== Sites of interest ===
The following entries are listed on the National Register of Historic Places:

- Old Atlantic Coast Line Union Depot.
- Bronson-Mulholland House (1854).
- Central Academy, Florida's first accredited African-American high school
- Larimer Memorial Library
- Palatka North Historic District
- Palatka South Historic District
- Ravine Gardens State Park
- St. Mark's Episcopal Church

=== Museums ===
- Bronson Mulholland House
- St Johns River Center
- Putnam Historic Museum
- Mariners Museum Inc.

=== Library ===
Historically, up to sixteen hundred people were employed at the Wilson Cypress Company mills, and a space was needed to further the education of its young working men. Funds for the first Palatka Public Library were provided by James Ross Mellon, son of Judge Thomas Mellon of Pittsburgh, who regularly wintered in Florida. Founded in 1930, the Larimer Library was gifted in commemoration of James Mellon's wife, Rachel Larimer, and was described as a "poor man's university" and "the rock on which to build an enlightened citizenry." The Larimer Memorial Library contains an arts center, and the Palatka Public Library was moved to the campus of the St. Johns River Community College.

== Parks and recreation ==
- James C. Godwin Riverfront Park
- Hank Bryan Park
- Ravine Gardens State Park
- Veteran's Memorial Park

== Government ==
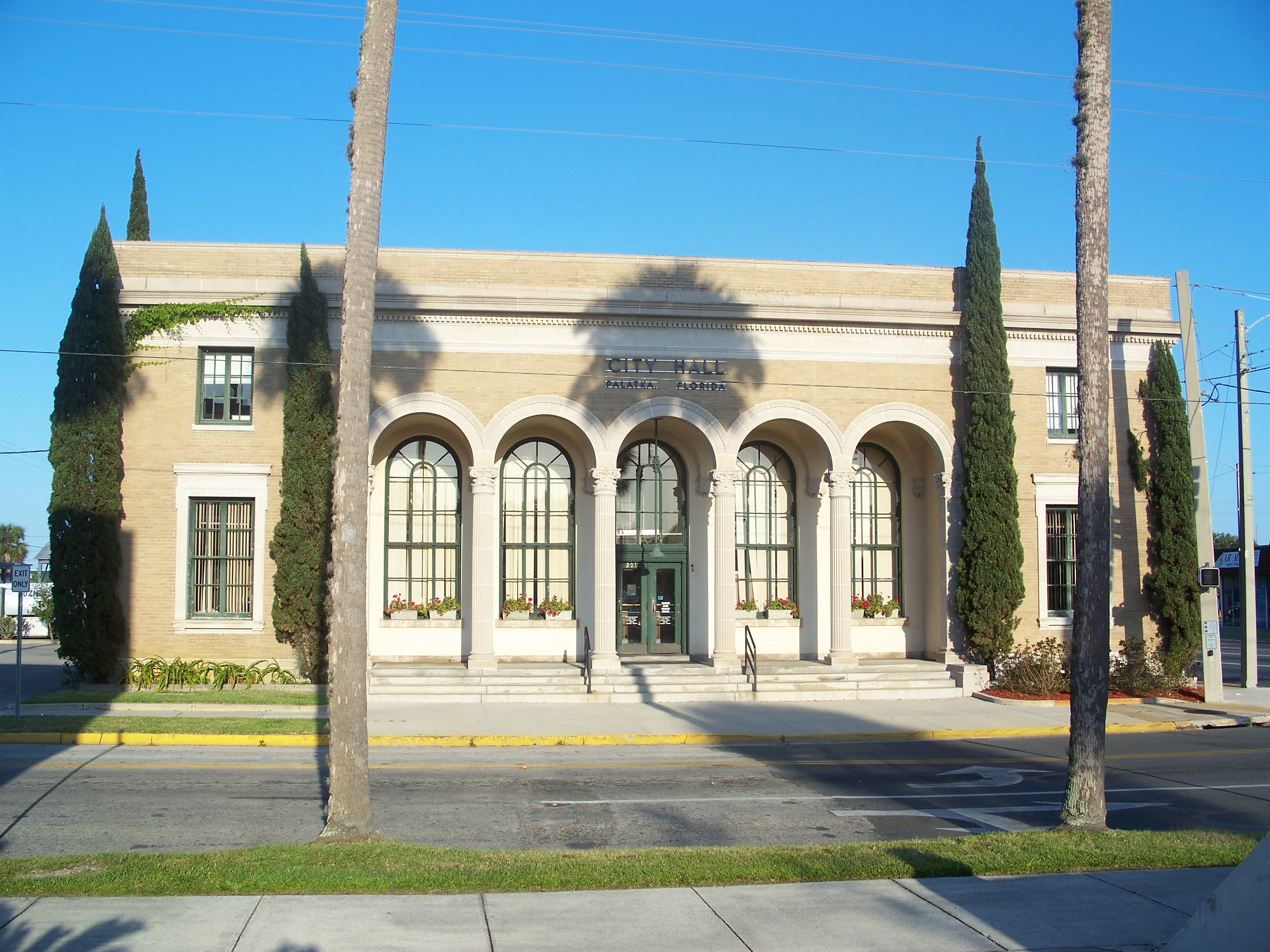
City Hall

Palatka uses the commission-manager form of municipal government, with all governmental powers resting in a legislative body called a commission. Palatka's commission is composed of five elected commissioners, one being the mayor/commissioner. The mayor and commissioners serve four year terms. The offices are non-partisan; no candidate is allowed to declare a party affiliation. The role of the commission is to set policy, pass ordinances and resolutions, adopt regulations, and appoint city officials, including the city manager. While the mayor serves as a presiding officer of the commission, the city manager is the administrative head of the municipal government, and is responsible for the administration of all departments. The mayor is Robbi Correa.

Representatives (2025)
Legislature	District	Party	Representative
United States Senate		R	Rick Scott
United States Senate		R	Ashley Moody
United States House of Representatives	6	R	Randy Fine
United States House of Representatives	5	R	John Rutherford
Florida House of Representatives	20	R	Judson Sapp
Florida Senate	7	R	Tom Leek

== Education ==
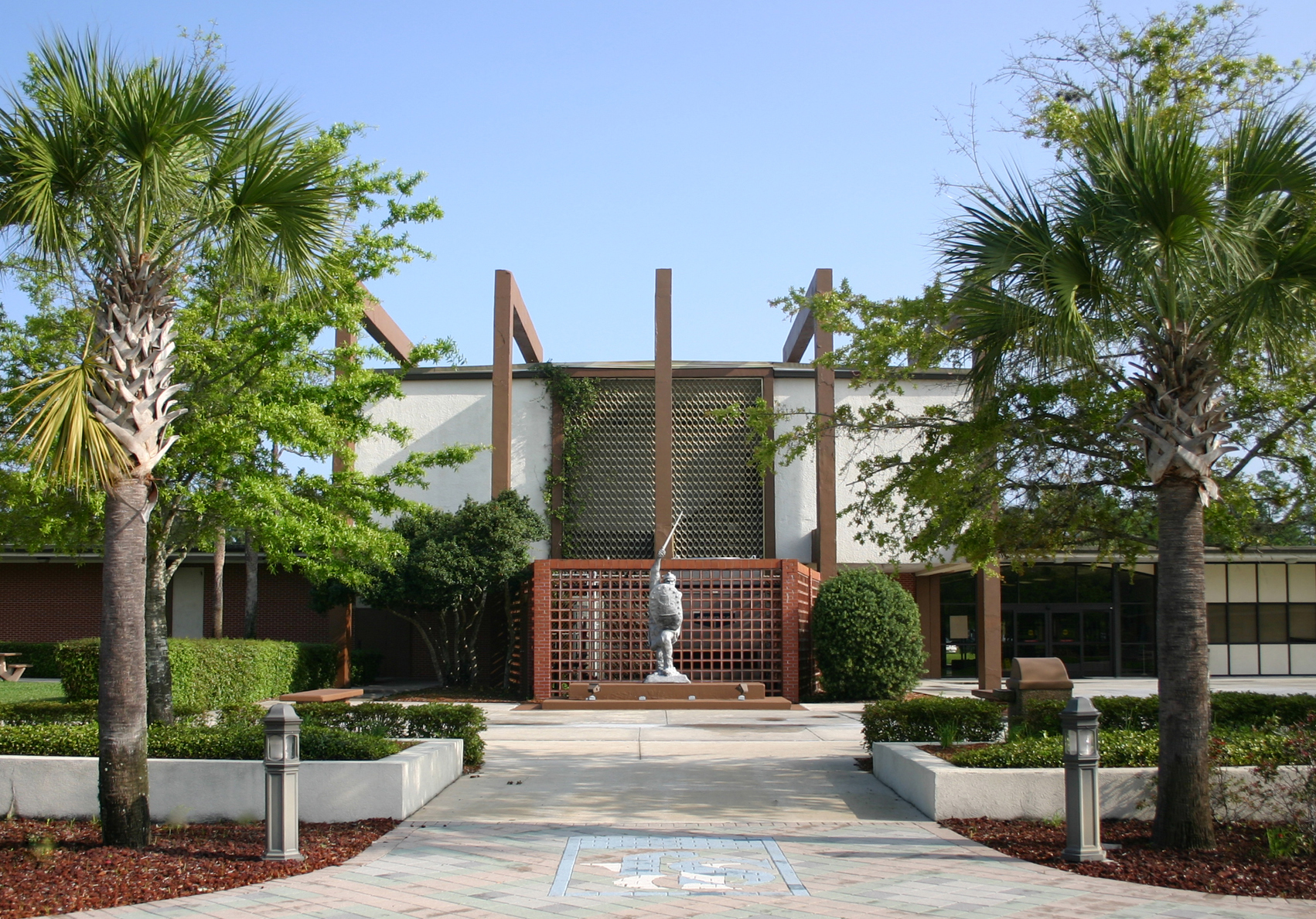
St. Johns River State College

The main center for higher education in the city is St. Johns River State College. In 1958, the institute opened in Palatka to 191 students. The school serves Putnam, Clay, and St. Johns Counties and enrolls approximately 10,000 students. The Palatka campus serves as the administrative center, it also houses the Florida School of the Arts and the local St. Leo University branch. Public primary and secondary education is operated by Putnam County Public Schools, officially known as the Putnam County School District (PCSD). According to 2007 enrollment numbers, the district is home to 12,101 students. Palatka has one public traditional high school. Palatka High School was formed in 1977 after the merger of Palatka Central High School and Palatka South High School. The Putnam County Library System serves Putnam County, Florida with five locations. The Palatka Library location operates as the systems headquarters.

== Infrastructure ==
=== Health care ===
HCA Florida Putnam Hospital in Palatka is a 99-bed acute care facility servicing all of Putnam County, and features medical and surgical units, 24-hour emergency, critical care, diagnostic imaging, and outpatient rehabilitation.

=== Transportation ===
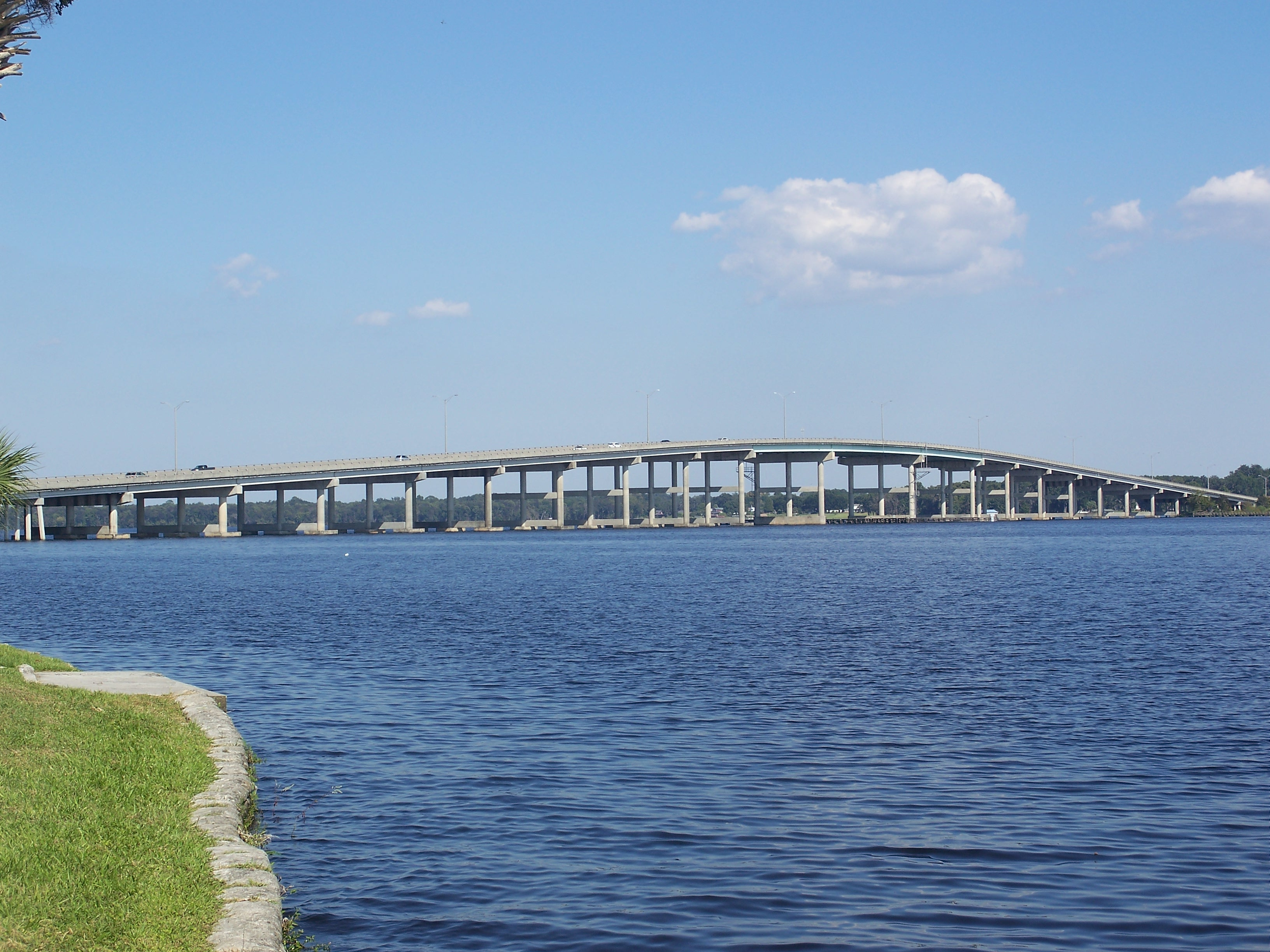
Memorial Bridge across St. Johns River.

Transportation has been key in the development of Palatka since the day of its inception. Steamboats were the main economic driving force in the city's early years. The river is no longer a primary means of passenger transportation, but remains of strategic importance in the movement of goods and services. Today, airports, railroads, and highways make up the main infrastructure of passenger travel. Palatka's own transportation infrastructure remains important as it is centrally located between large population centers in Jacksonville, a large educational institute in Gainesville, and tourist hubs in St. Augustine and Orlando.

==== Highways ====
- US 17 – Primary north–south route running parallel with the St. Johns River. This route connects Palatka to Jacksonville (northbound) and Orlando (southbound).
- SR 15 – From Jacksonville to Orlando US 17 and SR 15 are the same route.
- SR 19 – Terminating into US 17, SR 19 extends into the cities major commercial corridor. The route extends further into the Ocala National Forest and becomes the Florida Black Bear Scenic Byway.
- SR 20 – Primary route connecting Gainesville and Palatka.
- SR 100 – Route connecting Keystone Heights, Palatka, and Bunnell
- SR 207 – Primary route connecting East Palatka and St. Augustine

The bundled US 17, SR 20 and SR 100 cross the Memorial Bridge over the St. Johns River toward East Palatka.

==== Mass transit ====
Bus transportation in the city is provided by Ride Solution. The agency is responsible for public transit throughout all of Putnam County, Florida. Established in 1986 as ARC Transit, the original paratransit services have expanded to include regular bus services, express bus services, and vanpools. Recently, bus design and manufacturing has become a way Ride Solution is helping improve community transportation. The Brevi Bus was created to handle the rugged terrain and unpaved roads of rural Putnam County. The Bus was designed locally by Ride Solution and is expected to improve access by 30 percent.

==== Intercity transit ====
Amtrak serves Palatka by the daily Silver Meteor and Floridian intercity rail services. The Palatka Amtrak station is a historic Atlantic Coast Line Railroad depot located at 220 North Eleventh Street. The station was added in 1988 to the U.S. National Register of Historic Places.

Palatka Municipal Airport is a public-use, general aviation airport located 2 miles (3.2 km) northwest of Downtown Palatka. The nearest international airport is Jacksonville International Airport, approximatively 68 miles (109 km) north of Palatka. The closest major international airport is Orlando International Airport.

== Gallery ==
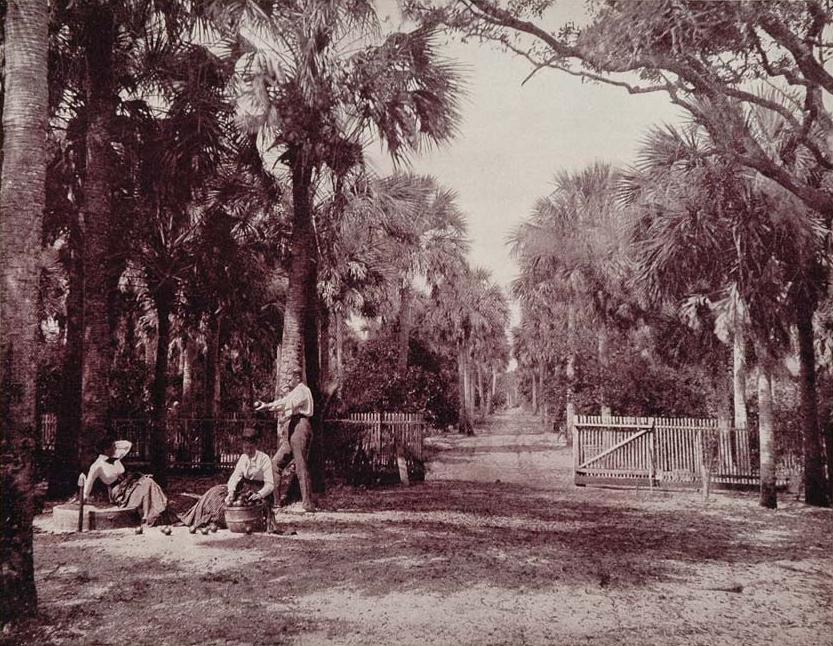
Palmetto glade in 1893

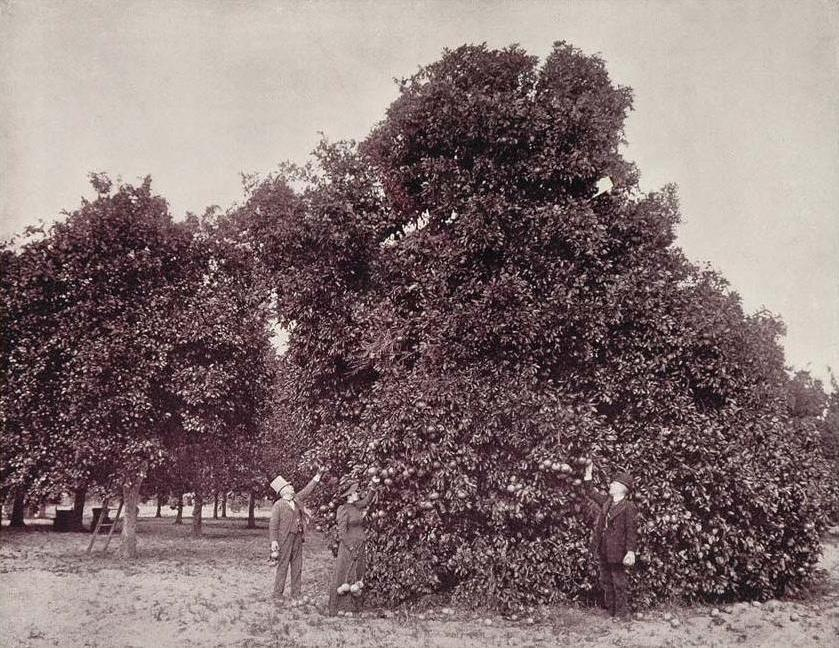
Orange grove in 1893

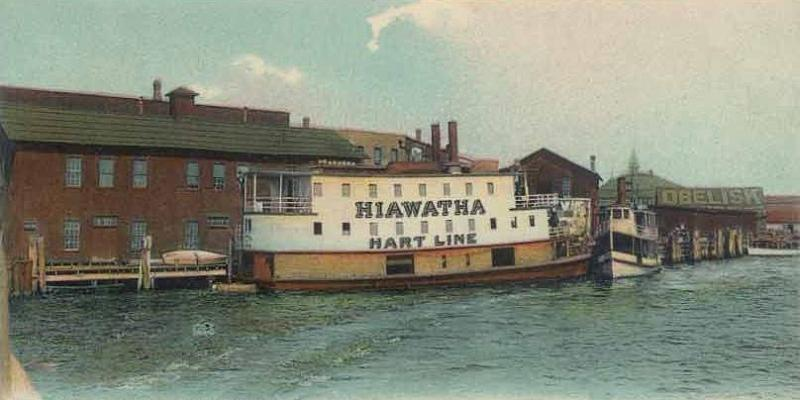
Steamer Hiawatha in 1905

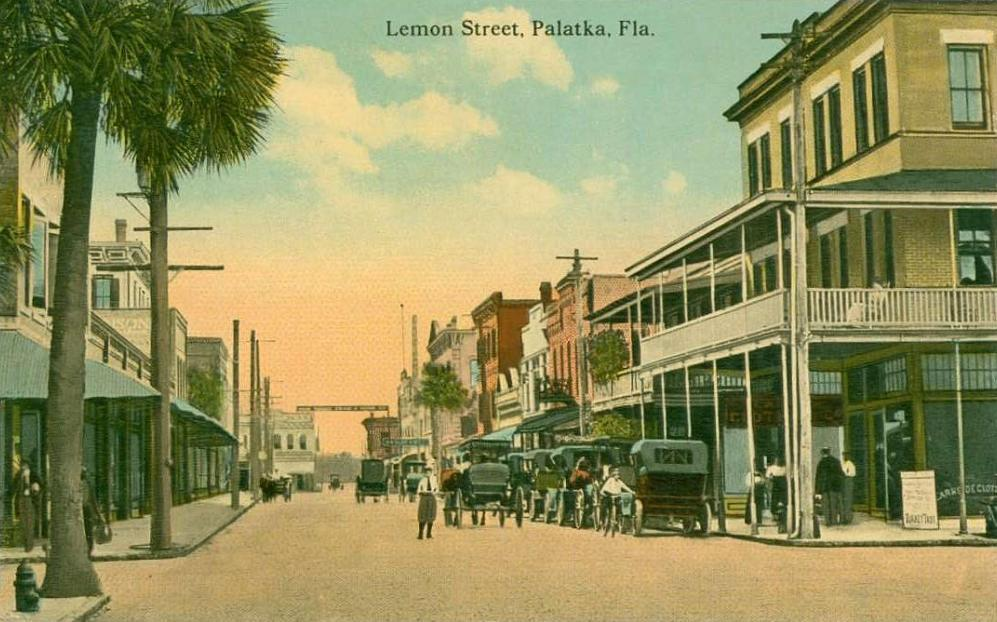
Lemon Street in 1915

== Sister cities ==
Palatka has one sister city.

- Palatka, Russia (1991)

== See also ==
- List of people from Palatka, Florida
