= Sisco, Florida =

Sisco
- Ghost town
- Location within the state of Florida
- Coordinates: 29°31′14″N 81°37′31″W
- Country: United States
- State: Florida
- County: Putnam

Sisco is a ghost town located in Putnam County, Florida, United States. It lies off U.S. Route 17 approximately 10 miles north of Crescent City.

Sisco was settled by Henry W. and Claire Sisco along the Palatka & Indian River extension of the Jacksonville, Tampa and Key West Railway. In 1885, Mr. Sisco made application to the department at Washington for a post office to be located at the new town of "Sisco", his petition having forty-one signatures.

For the next forty years or so, the population of the town ranged from 150 people to 60 people and, at times, had a post office, hotel, general store and a steam sawmill.

During the 1920s, there was a steamboat stop along Dunns Creek that provided wood and water to the ships loaded with citrus and it was used also as a post office for the towns of Pomona and Cisco.

Sisco was one of the many towns mostly abandoned following the Great Freeze.
