= Downtown Palatka =

Coordinates: 29°38′47″N 81°37′56″W

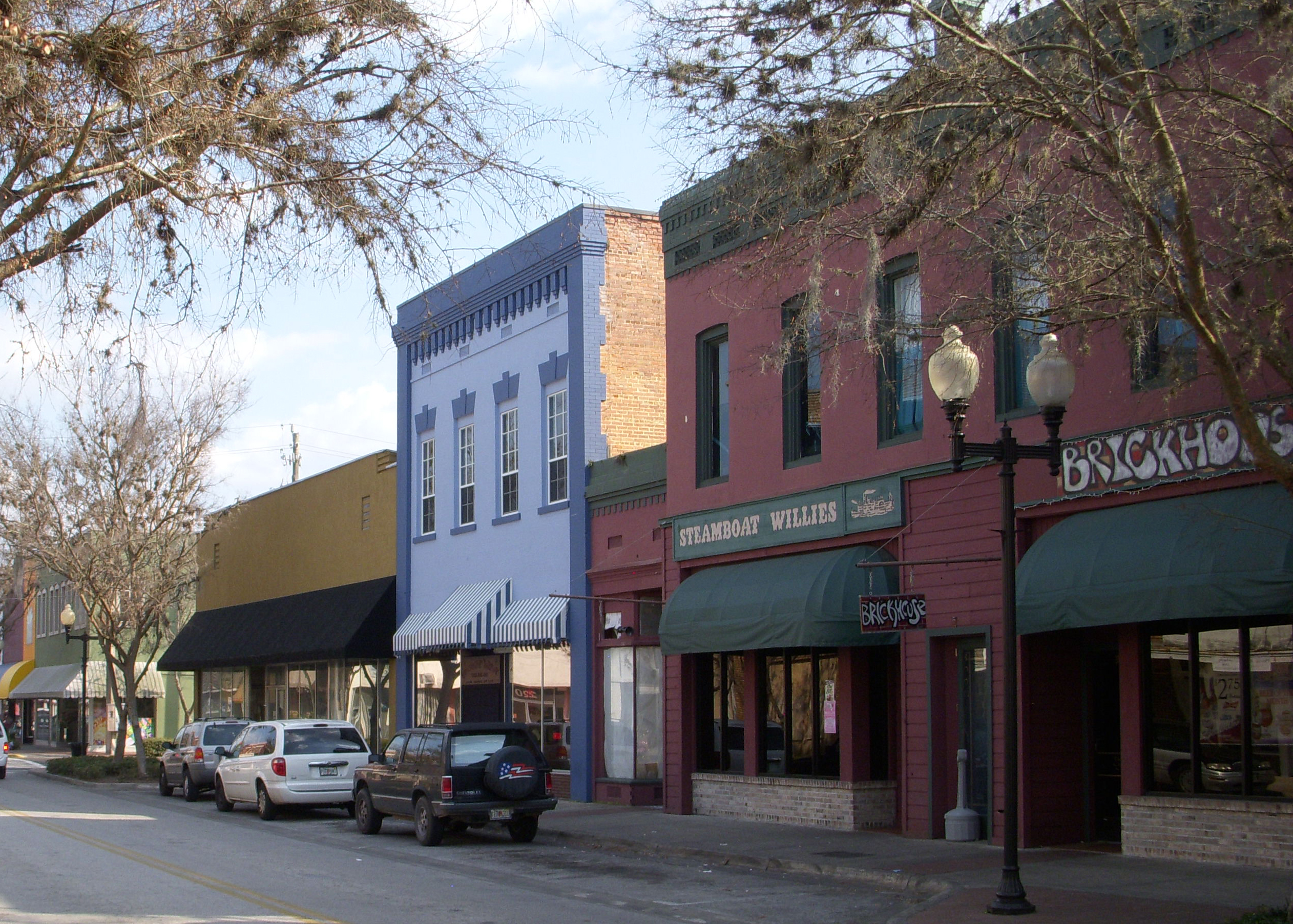
Downtown Palatka

Downtown Palatka is the central business district of Palatka, Florida. According to the Palatka Community Redevelopment Agency, the district is bounded by Main Street to the north, Laural Street to the south, the St. Johns River to the east, and Eleventh Street to the west, Historical Fort Shannon was located at the east end of downtown on the river, near what is today City Hall. Area transportation is conducted by Ride Solution and connects downtown passengers to other core areas in Putnam County.

Public offices and services located in the downtown area:

- Palatka City Hall
- Palatka Gas Authority
- Palatka Housing Authority
- Palatka Police Department
- Palatka Post Office
- Palatka Union Depot
- Putnam County Chamber of Commerce
- Putnam County Courthouse
- Putnam County School Board

== Arts and culture ==
The downtown area contains important local cultural landmarks such as the Larimer Arts Center, Tilghman House, Bronson-Mulholland House, and the David Browning Railroad Museum. Downtown also plays host to local festivals and events including, the Florida Azalea Festival, Blue Crab Festival, Palatka Porch fest, and Mug Race. Numerous other public gathers occur throughout the year. Murals have become a common sight on the streets of downtown. Headed by the Conlee Mural Committee, the group has transformed numerous building walls into works of art.

== Governance ==
Downtown Palatka, Inc. is a non-profit organization that represents area merchants and promotes local events in the downtown area. Palatka Community Redevelopment Agency is an organization established in 1983 to oversee the revitalization of downtown and the historic districts. Issues of concern to the agency include the presence of substandard or inadequate structures, a shortage of affordable housing, inadequate infrastructure, insufficient roadways, and inadequate parking.

== Historic Lemon Street ==
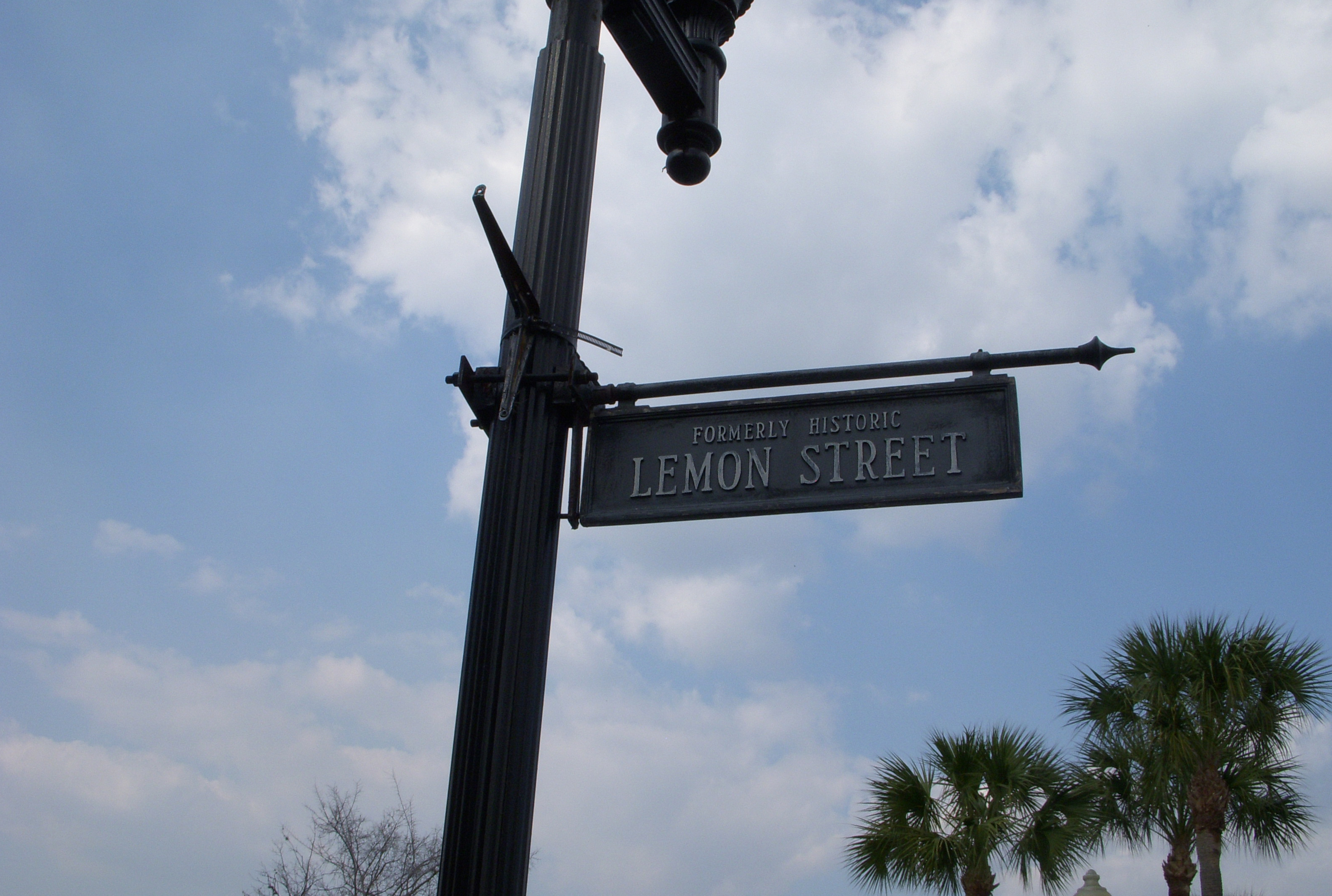
Lemon Street Sign

Technically, Lemon Street is the portion of St. Johns Avenue that extends into Downtown Palatka. The tree lined street serves as the main shopping district in the city. The area has made strides in becoming a 24-hour neighborhood, with new restaurants, bars and other establishments opening in recent years. During large events vehicular traffic is diverted and the street acts as the main pedestrian-way, housing vendors and entertainment.

== Surrounding neighborhoods ==
- Palatka North Historic District
- Palatka South Historic District
- Palatka Heights
- Newtown
- East Palatka
