= Ridgewood, Florida =

Unincorporated community in Florida, US

Coordinates: 29°28′52″N 81°38′49″W

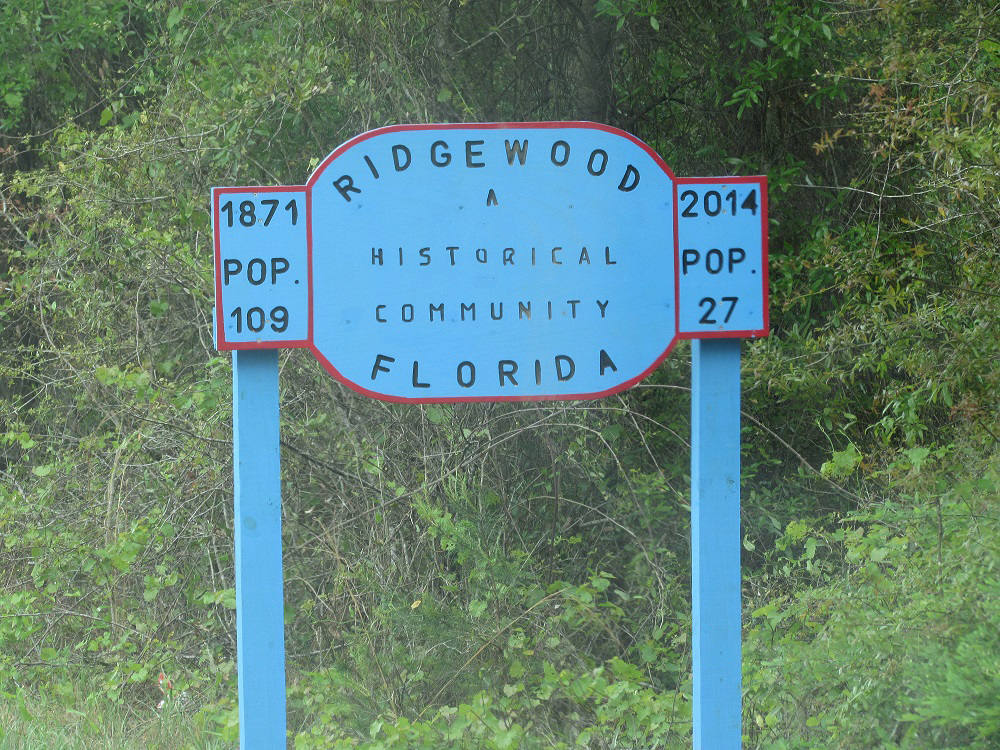
Ridgewood Sign

Ridgewood is an unincorporated community located in Putnam County, Florida, United States. Situated two miles east of Welaka and 3 1/4 miles southwest of Pomona Park. First settled in 1871, by 1883 Ridgewood had a population of 100 with a post office, one store, two steam saw mills and a public school. The hard freezes of the 1890s destroyed most of the citrus crops in the area and as a result the community declined. In the years ahead, a forest fire was said to have destroyed the remainder of the town during the 1920s.

Archive & Post Office Records

All that remains of Ridgewood is a cemetery, now known as the Welaka-Georgetown Cemetery but was once known as Ridgewood Cemetery. Putnam County records show the first burial was recorded in 1917. Mail ran on Monday, Wednesday, Friday and Saturday. Unimproved land sold from $5 to $30 per acre. Application to start a post office by Franklin B Parse was submitted May 30, 1883 to the United States Postal Service, approved and appointed June 15, 1883.

Post Master	Date Appointed
Franklin B Parse	June 15, 1883
Gerald C Butler	June 5, 1888
Fred W Parsch	June 26, 1896

Post Office discontinued on November 15, 1900, mail sent to Fairview.
