= List of county roads in Putnam County, Florida =

- County road shields used in Florida

Highway names
- Interstates: Interstate X (I-X)
- US Highways: U.S. Highway X (US X)
- State: State Road X (SR X)
- County: County Road X (CR X)

System links
- County roads in Florida; County roads in Putnam County

The following is a list of county roads in Putnam County, Florida. All county roads are maintained by the county in which they reside; however, not all of them are marked with standard MUTCD approved county road shields.

== List of County Roads in Putnam County, Florida ==
#	Road Name(s)	Direction and Termini					Notes
CR 20A		W/E	SRs 20 & 21	McMeekin	CR 21		former SR 20A
CR 21		S/N	Marion-Putnam County Line		SR 21	South of Banana	former SR 21
CR 207A		W/E	East River Road	East Palatka	US 17	Federal Point	former SR 207A
CR 209	West River Road; Palmetto Bluff Road	S/N	US 17		US 17	Bostwick	former SR 209
CR 209A	Palmetto Bluff Road	W/E	CR 209		St. Johns River		former SR 209A
CR 216	John W. Campbell Highway	N/S	SR 100	Palatka	US 17	Palatka	former SR 216
CR 219			SR 26	Melrose		Putnam-Clay County Line	former SR 219
CR 308	Huntington Road	W/E	CR 309	Fruitland	US 17	Crescent City	former SR 308
CR 308B	Elm Street; W Main Street	W/E	CR 309	Welaka	US 17	Pomona Park	former SR 308B
CR 309	3rd Avenue	S/N	Georgetown Denver Road	Georgetown	US 17	Satsuma	former SR 309
CR 309B	Buffalo Bluff Road	S/N	US 17		St. John's River		former SR 309B
CR 309C			SR 20		SR 100	Springside	former SR 309C
CR 309D	Bardin Rd	N/S	SR 100		Clay County		
CR 310		W/E	CR 315		SR 19		former SR 310
CR 310	Silver Lake Drive						
CR 311	Husson Avenue		Edgemoor Street		SR 20		former SR 311
CR 315		S/N	Marion County line		Clay County line (CR 315C)		former SR 315
