= Lake Como, Florida =

- Unincorporated community
- Location within Florida
- Coordinates: 29°29′02″N 81°34′22″W
- Country: United States
- State: Florida
- County: Putnam
- Elevation: 69 ft (21 m)
- Time zone: UTC-5 (Eastern (EST))
  - Summer (DST): UTC-4 (EDT)
- Zip code: 32157
- Area code: 386
- GNIS feature ID: 285227

Lake Como is an unincorporated community located in Putnam County, Florida, United States. The zip code is: 32157. The community is located along Old Highway 17 between Crescent City and Pomona Park.

The community of Lake Como has been confused with Lake Como Family Park and Community/Coop which is about 130 miles to the southwest in Land O' Lakes, Florida in Pasco County, immediately north of Tampa.
