= Dunns Creek State Park =

Protected area in Florida, United States

- IUCN category V (protected landscape/seascape)
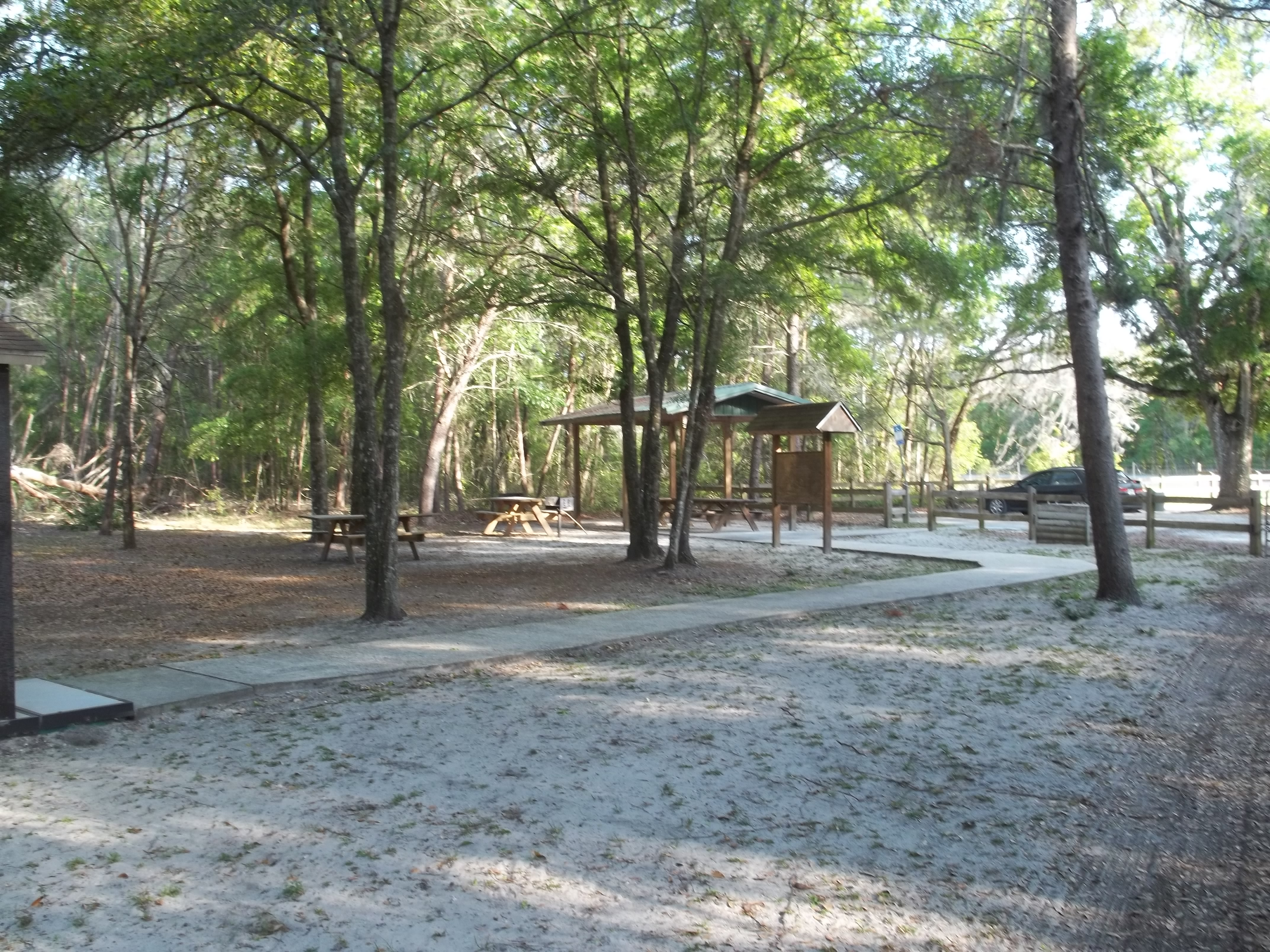

- Location within Florida Location within the United States
- Interactive map of Dunns Creek State Park
- Location: Putnam County, Florida, USA
- Nearest city: Crescent City, Florida
- Coordinates: 29.5266°N 81.5893°W
- Governing body: Florida Department of Environmental Protection

Dunns Creek State Park is a Florida State Park, located approximately 24 kilometers or 15 miles south of Palatka, on US 17. The park is named for John Dunn, a lawyer and coffee planter. He received a grant in 1765 that allowed him to farm an area “between the two lakes” in Putnam County.

== History ==
Native Americans used this site as evidenced by the fairly widespread burial mounds. During the 1920s, a steamboat stop provided wood and water to citrus loaded ships. The area was also used as a post office for the towns of Pomona and Sisco. The 6,302-acre property was the site of turpentining, logging, cattle ranching and farming operations within the last century. Dunns Creek provides outflow from Crescent Lake to the St Johns River. The state park is located south of a sharp bend in the St. Johns River along Dunns Creek. The Florida Park Service acquired the park from The Nature Conservancy on October 10, 2001. Just north across the creek lies the 6,302-acre Dunns Creek Conservation Area, purchased in 1992 by the St. Johns River Water Management District. Together they provide large floodplain areas and water storage, helping protect about five miles of shoreline on Dunns Creek with a buffer area shielding the aquatic systems from adverse impacts.

== Recreation ==
The park has multi-use trails for hiking, cycling, and horseback riding.
