= Andalusia, Florida =

Town in the state of Florida, United States

- Unincorporated area
- Interactive map of Andalusia, Florida
- Coordinates: 29°30′00″N 81°29′05″W
- Country: United States
- State: Florida
- County: Flagler
- Elevation: 10 ft (3.0 m)
- Time zone: UTC-5 (Eastern (EST))
- Postal code: 32110
- GNIS ID: 295092

Andalusia is an unincorporated area located by Florida State Road 100 in the western part of Flagler County, Florida, United States. It is east of Crescent Lake.

== History ==
In 1911, Falco Lumber Company established a railroad from their mill company headquartered in Falco, Alabama, to Galliver north.
