= Bostwick School =

- U.S. National Register of Historic Places
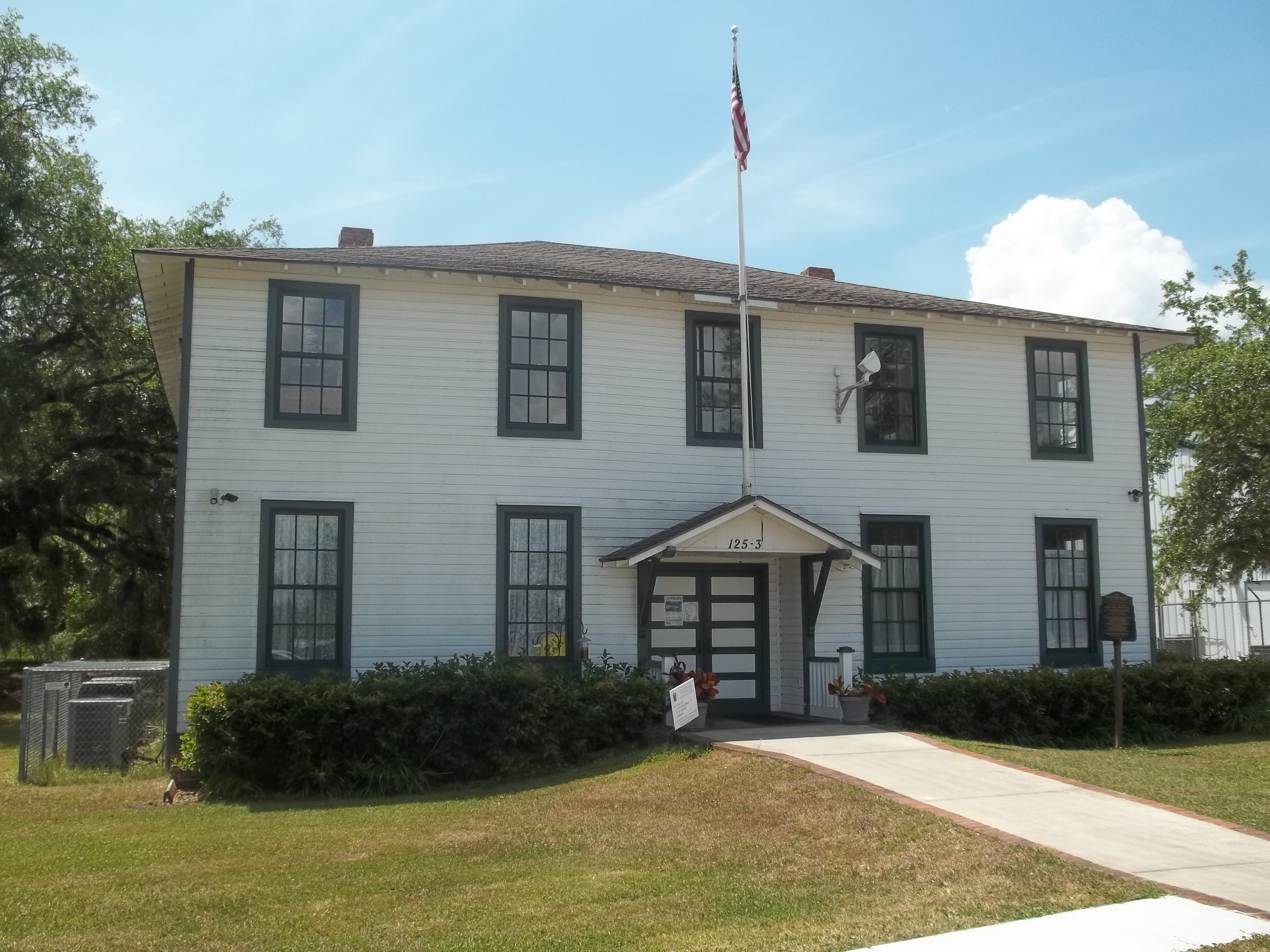

- Location within Florida Location within the United States
- Location: Bostwick, Florida
- Coordinates: 29°46′16″N 81°38′2″W
- NRHP reference No.: 99001204
- Added to NRHP: 29 September 1999

The Bostwick School (also known as the Old Bostwick School) is a historic site in Bostwick, Florida, United States. It is located at 125 Tillman Street. On September 29, 1999, it was added to the U.S. National Register of Historic Places.

== History ==
The school was built in 1921. It had two floors with the first floor having four rooms, with two classes in each room. The first floor was used for grades 1 through 8, and the second floor was used for assemblies. The school also had a stage with rooms on either side for a kitchen and a library. At the rear of the building were restrooms and a water trough. It remained in use until its closure in 1977.

The school has since been renovated and converted into the Bostwick Library, a branch of the Putnam County Library System. Renovation was completed on December 4, 2007.
