= Grandin, Florida =

Unincorporated community in Florida, U.S.

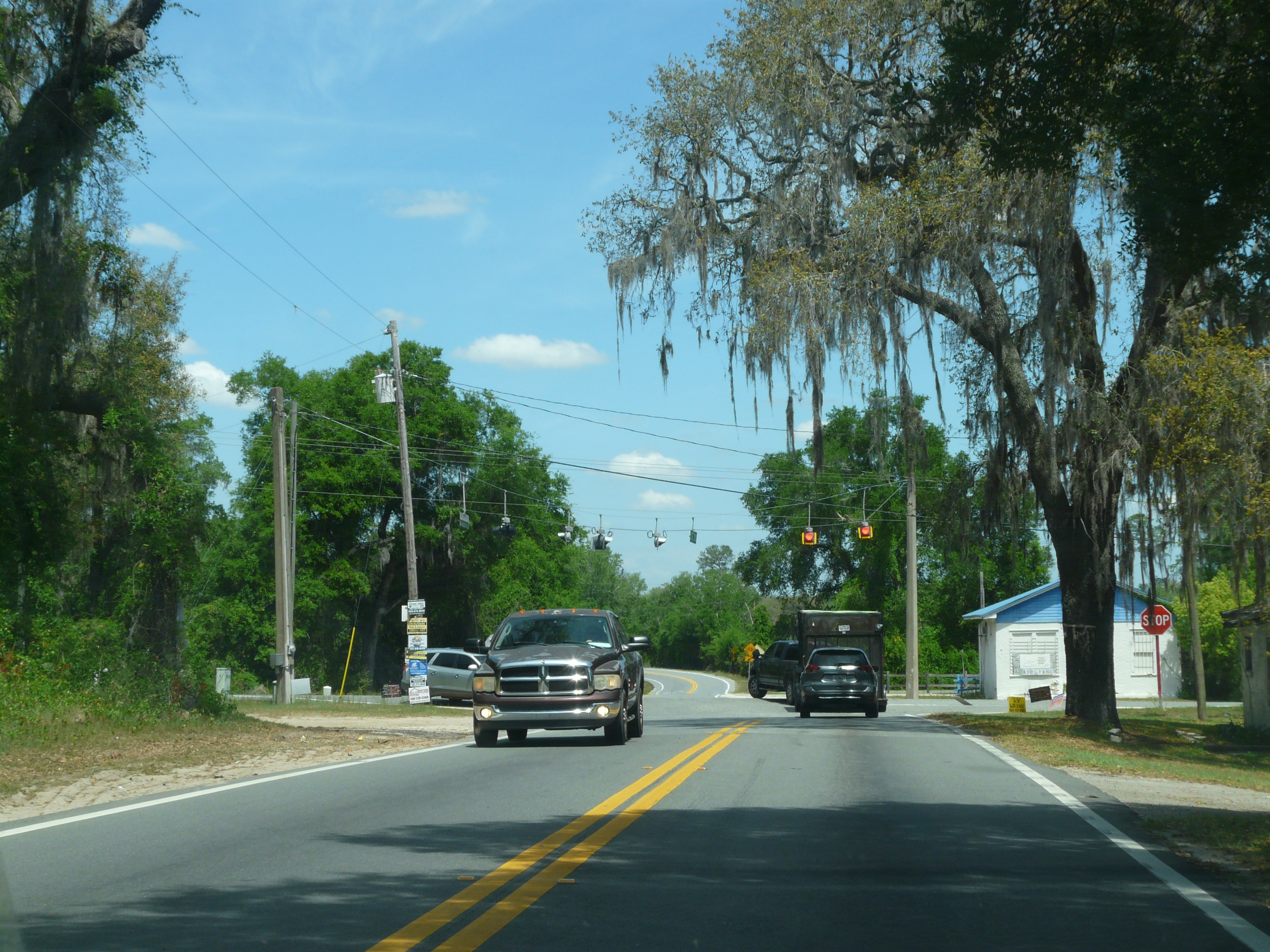
- Intersection of CR-315 and SR-100 in Grandin
- Interactive map of Grandin, Florida
- Country: United States
- State: Florida
- County: Putnam County
- Elevation: 102 ft (31 m)
- GNIS ID: 283278

Grandin is an unincorporated community in Putnam County, Florida, United States. It is located near the State Road 100/County Road 315 intersection. As of the 2000 census, its population was 192.

Mostly known for its sand and rock plants, the hills in this area are part of a northern unconnected extension of the Lake Wales Ridge. Grandin is used heavily by Florida Rock Industries Inc. as a source of undifferentiated sand.

== Geography ==
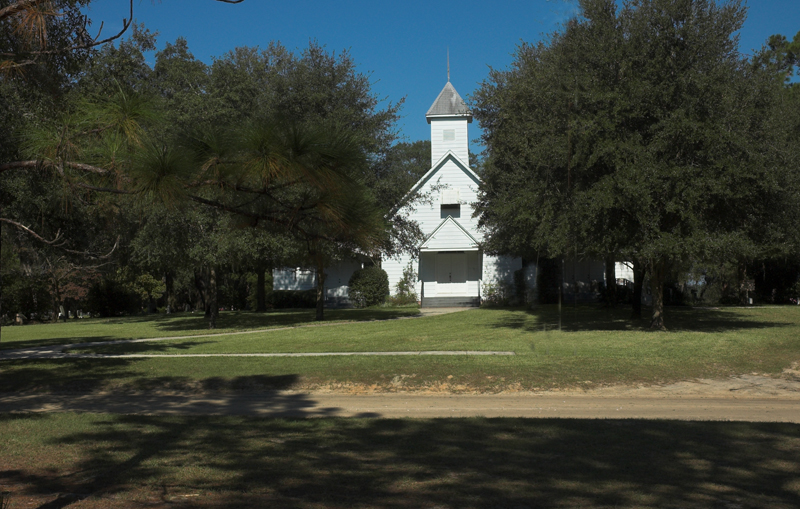
Paran Baptist Church, Grandin, Florida, November 2005

Grandin is located at 29°43′40″N 81°55′06″W.
