= Palatka Heights =

Neighborhood in Palatka, Florida

Coordinates: 29.64334°N 81.64970°W

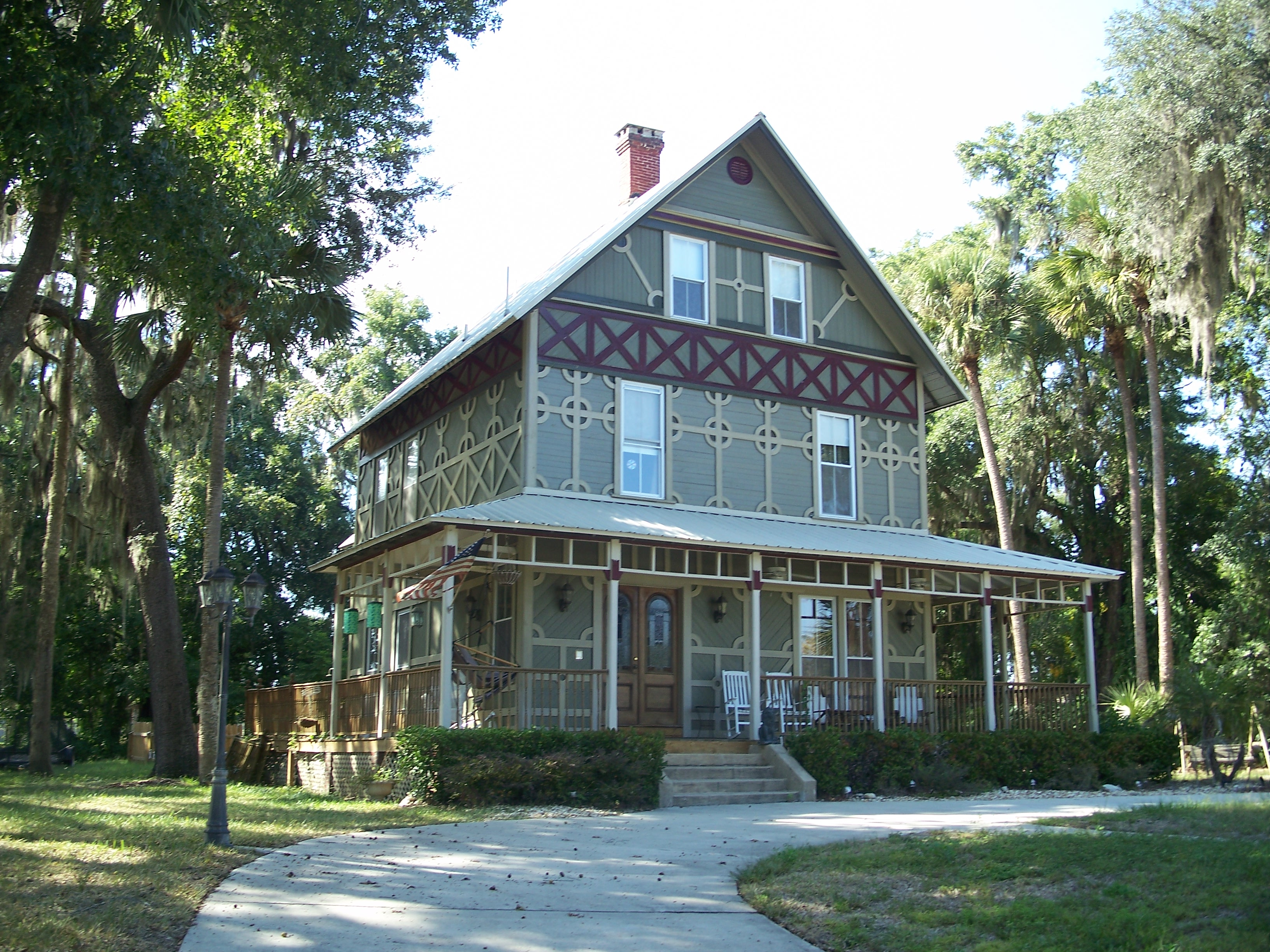
Residence in Palatka Heights

Palatka Heights is a neighborhood southwest of downtown Palatka, Florida in the United States. The area is bordered by St. Johns Avenue to the north, Westover Drive to the west, and the Ravine Gardens State Park to the south. The neighborhood houses the Palatka Water Works, which provided citizens with water from 1886 until the end of the 1980s. The City of Palatka Heights was incorporated July 23, 1886 and existed until its annexation by Palatka in 1921.
