= Huntington, Putnam County, Florida =

Unincorporated community in Florida, U.S.

Coordinates: 29°26′26″N 81°33′09″W

Huntington is an unincorporated community located in Putnam County, Florida, United States. It is located along Putnam County Road 308 west of Crescent City, Florida.
