= Florida Azalea Festival =

Coordinates: 29°38′46″N 81°37′44″W

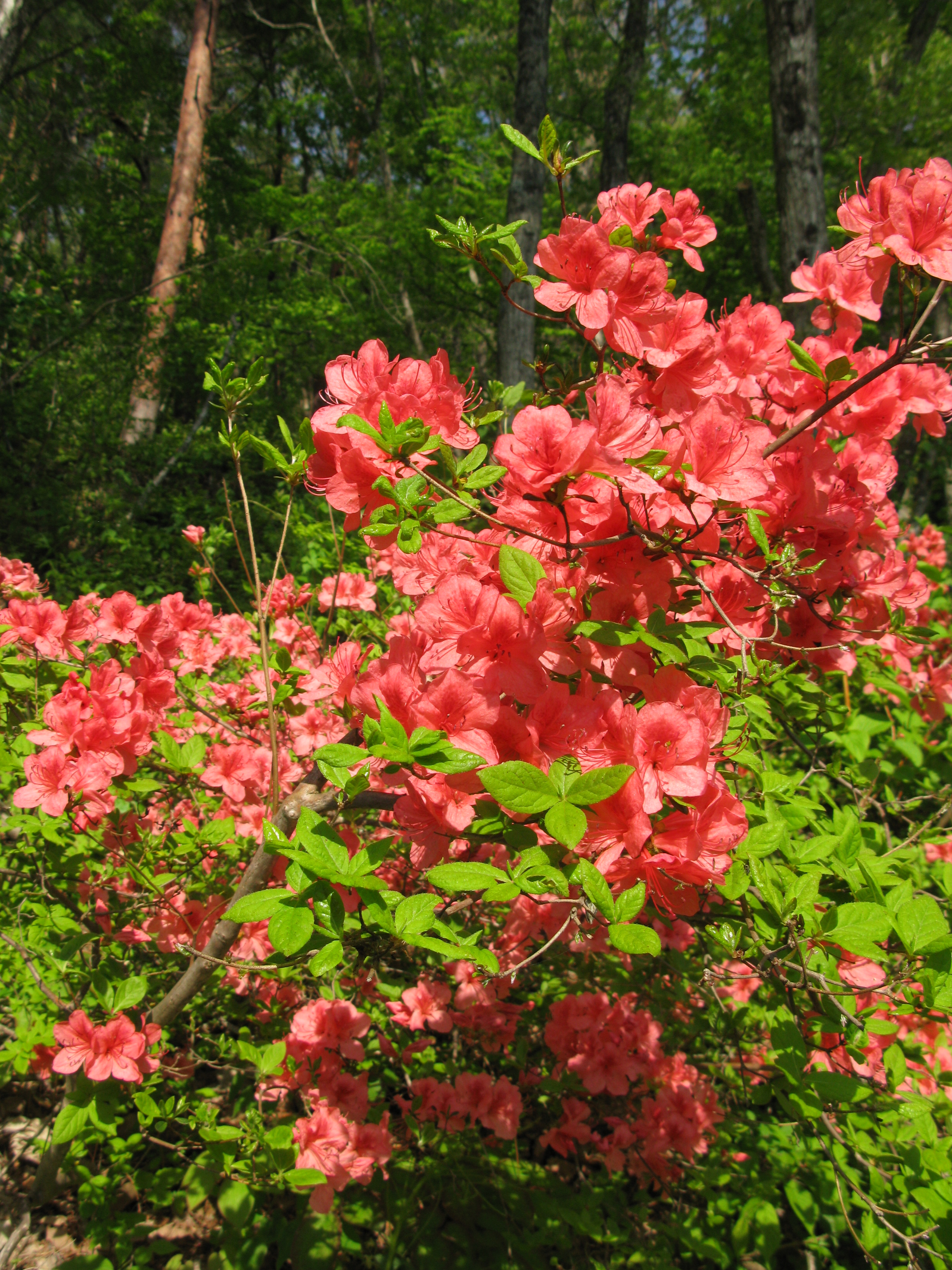
Rhododendron kaempferi, the torch or Kaempfer azalea

The Florida Azalea Festival is a two-day event held annually in Palatka, Florida, on the first weekend of March. The festival celebrates the seasonal arrival of the azalea blossom to the northeast Florida region.

== History ==
The first official Florida Azalea Festival was held in 1938. Originating as Jaycees Day, the local chapter of the Jaycees organization transformed the event into the festival celebrated today. In the early years the festival was centered at the Ravine Gardens. As its popularity grew, most of the activities were moved to the riverfront in downtown Palatka.

The modern event is conducted by the Palatka Main Street program. The Ravine Gardens still joins in the celebration with what it calls Azalea Days. Its diverse collection and high concentration of the flower makes it a staple for those who want to get a good look at the celebrated annual blooms.

There was no festival in 1942-45 nor 2021.

== Azalea Festival events ==
Azalea Festival events open to the public generally include:

- The Azalea Parade, featuring floats, bands and a number of community groups
- The Azalea Festival Arts and Crafts Show at Historic Lemon Street
- The Azalea Pageant
- Azalea Days at Ravine Gardens State Park
- Open Car Show
- Florida Azalea Amateur at the Palatka Golf Club
- Bowling Tournament
