= Palatka Golf Club =

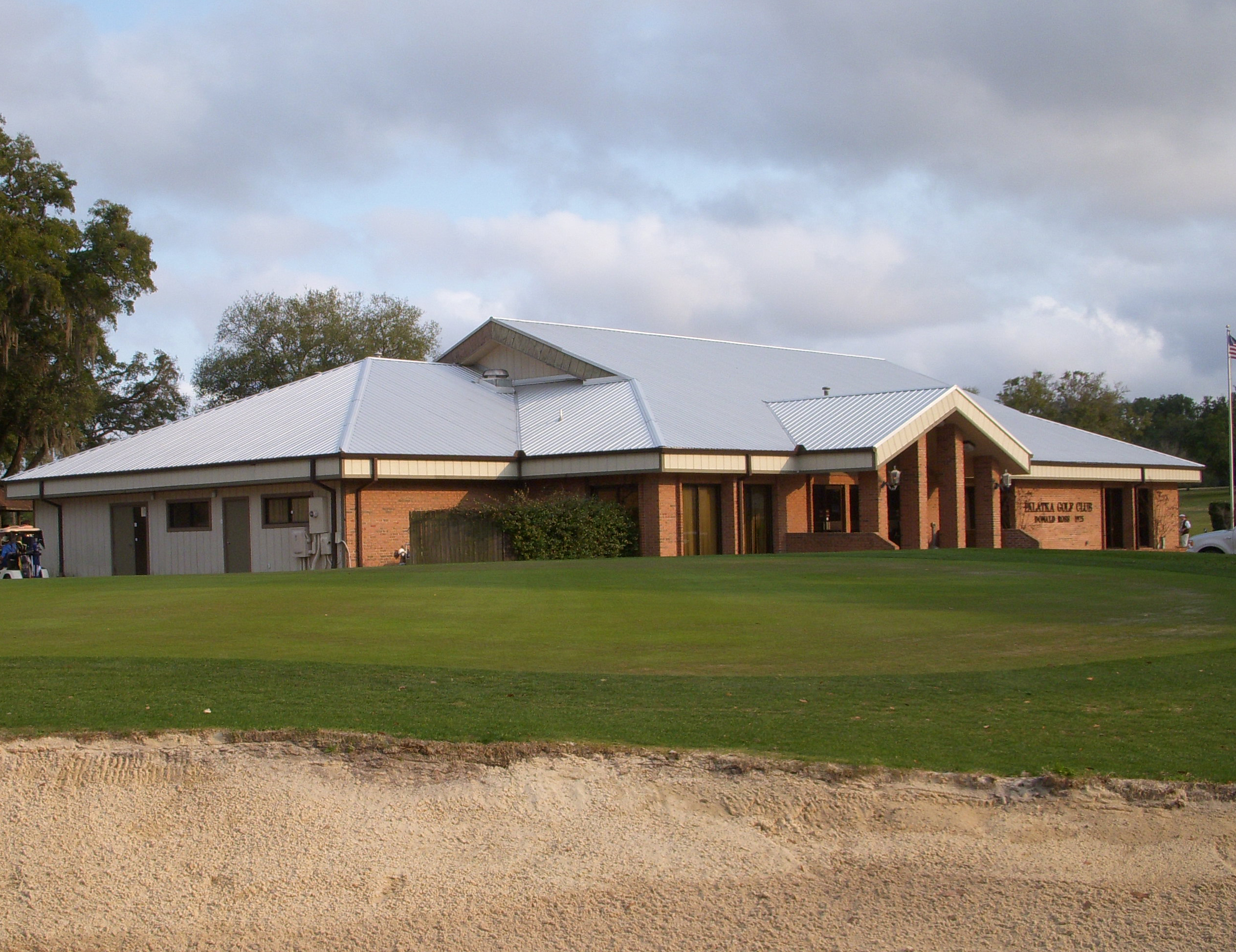

Club information
- Location: Palatka, Florida
- Established: 1925
- Type: Public
- Tota holes: 18
- Tournaments: • Florida Azalea Amateur/Senior • Don McNab Junior Tournament • Lee Conlee House Tournament • Relay for Life • Beck Pro/Am
- Website: palatkagolfclub.com

Palatka Golf Club
- Designed by: Donald Ross
- Par: 70
- Length: 5,942 yards (5,433 m)
- Course rating: 67.1

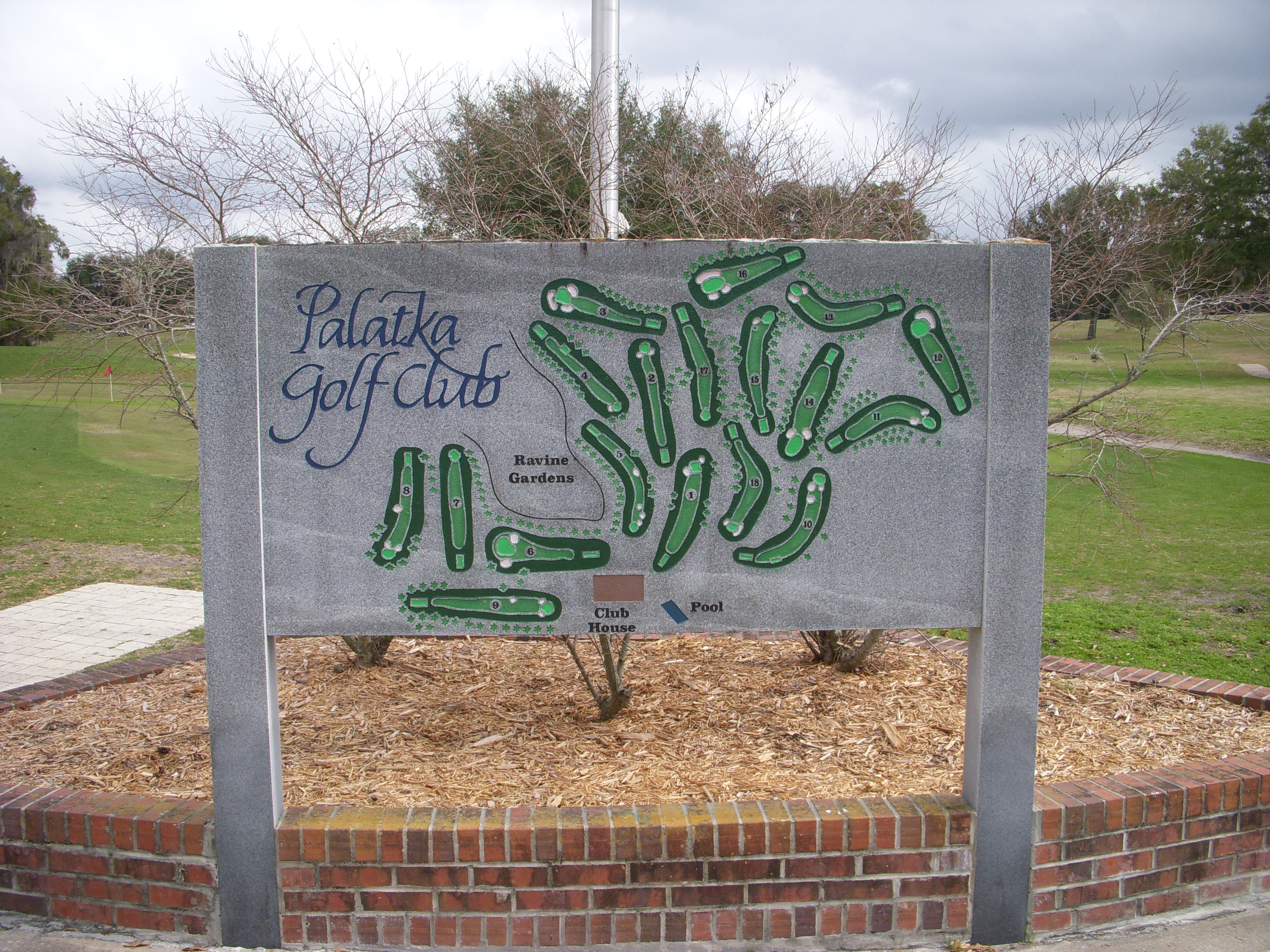

The Palatka Golf Club is a public-use golf course established in 1925. Designed by Donald Ross, the course borders the Ravine Gardens State Park and is 5942 yards long. The golf club is located at 1715 Moseley Avenue Palatka, Florida.
