= Alligator (steamboat) =

Steamboat in Florida

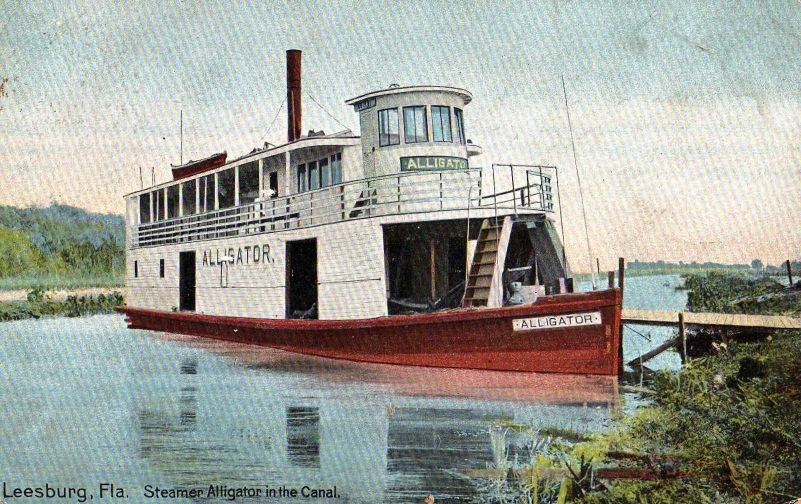
- Alligator at Leesburg, Florida (1906 configuration)

History
- Name: Alligator
- Operator: Lucas Line
- Route: Oklawaha, St. Johns rivers
- Launched: 7 October 1888
- Fate: Burned and sank 5 November 1909

General characteristics
- Tonnage: (1888): 27.7 gross tons; (1889): 66.2 gross tons; (1894): 69.6 gross tons
- Length: (1888): 57 ft; (1889): 71 ft; (1894): 81 ft 4 in (24.79 m)
- Beam: 18 ft 7 in (5.66 m)
- Draft: 3 ft 5 in (1.04 m)
- Propulsion: (1888): Steam-driven screw; (1889): Recesssed stern wheel

The Alligator was an inboard paddle-wheel steamboat that operated in the interior of Central Florida in the United States from 1888 to 1909. Archeologist Clarence Bloomfield Moore leased the steamer each year from 1891 to 1895 for his annual excursions to explore the St. Johns River and tributaries for Native American artifacts. On 5 November 1909, the paddle-steamer caught fire and sank ending its 21 years of service in the passenger and freight business. In December 2008, the Lighthouse Archaeological Maritime Program led a search of the east side of Crescent Lake for the sunken wreckage of the Alligator.

== Design and construction ==
The Ocklawaha River was a primary route of transportation in Central Florida during the years after the Civil War until railroads reached the area. Previously foreign to the region, small, compact steamboats evolved to service the narrow, winding river. The boats were fitted with an inboard stern paddle wheel to aid in navigating the narrow, thickly treed, and weedy waterways.

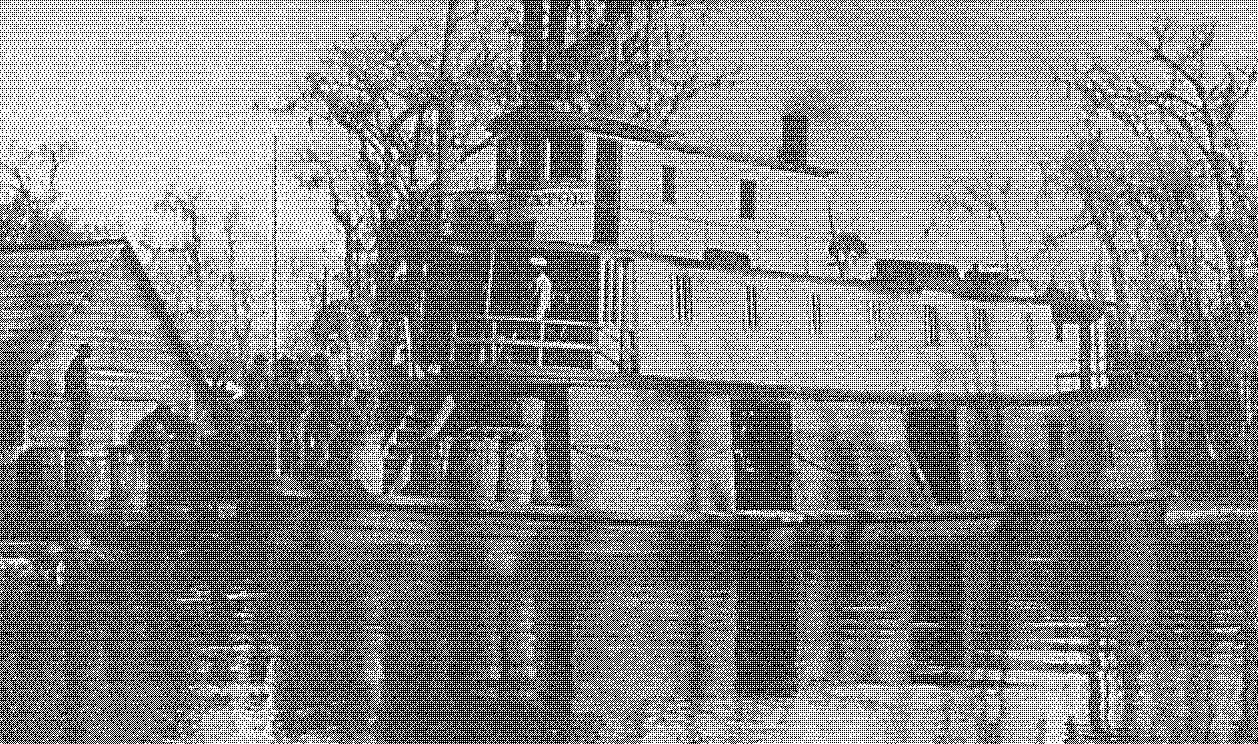
Alligator in 1890 after first rebuild

The Alligator was constructed for Captain C. W. Howard for use in a commercial passenger and freight operation on the Ocklawaha and St. Johns rivers. On 7 October 1888, Alligator was launched on the west bank of St. Johns River at Norwalk. It measured 57 feet (17 m) long, 18 feet 7 inches (5.66 m) wide, 3 feet 5 inches (1.04 m) deep, and was 27.71 gross tons. Originally, a propeller was installed between two skegs under the transom. The vessel was "a patchwork of parts from other steamboats".

During the boat's 21 years of service, the paddle-steamer was rebuilt by several different owners. A Certificate of Enrollment issued on 21 January 1890, when ownership of the steamboat was transferred to brothers Charles B. and Benjamen Wade shows a rebuild in 1889. The paddle-steamer was lengthened to 71 feet (22 m). It weighed 66.21 gross tons and was modified to have a recessed stern wheel instead of a propeller. According to a 13 January 1894, Certificate of Enrollment, the steamboat was lengthened to 81 feet 4 inches (24.79 m) with a gross weight of 69.60 tons with "an enlarged cabin deck running the full length of the boat above the boiler deck" and a larger captain's cabin. The Alligator's final rebuild occurred in 1906. The reconfiguration made the boat more suitable for local freight and passenger trips rather than more lengthy transport. The cabin deck was removed and replaced with an open deck running half the length of the boat; with the pilot house and captain's cabin placed on that same level.

== Operation ==
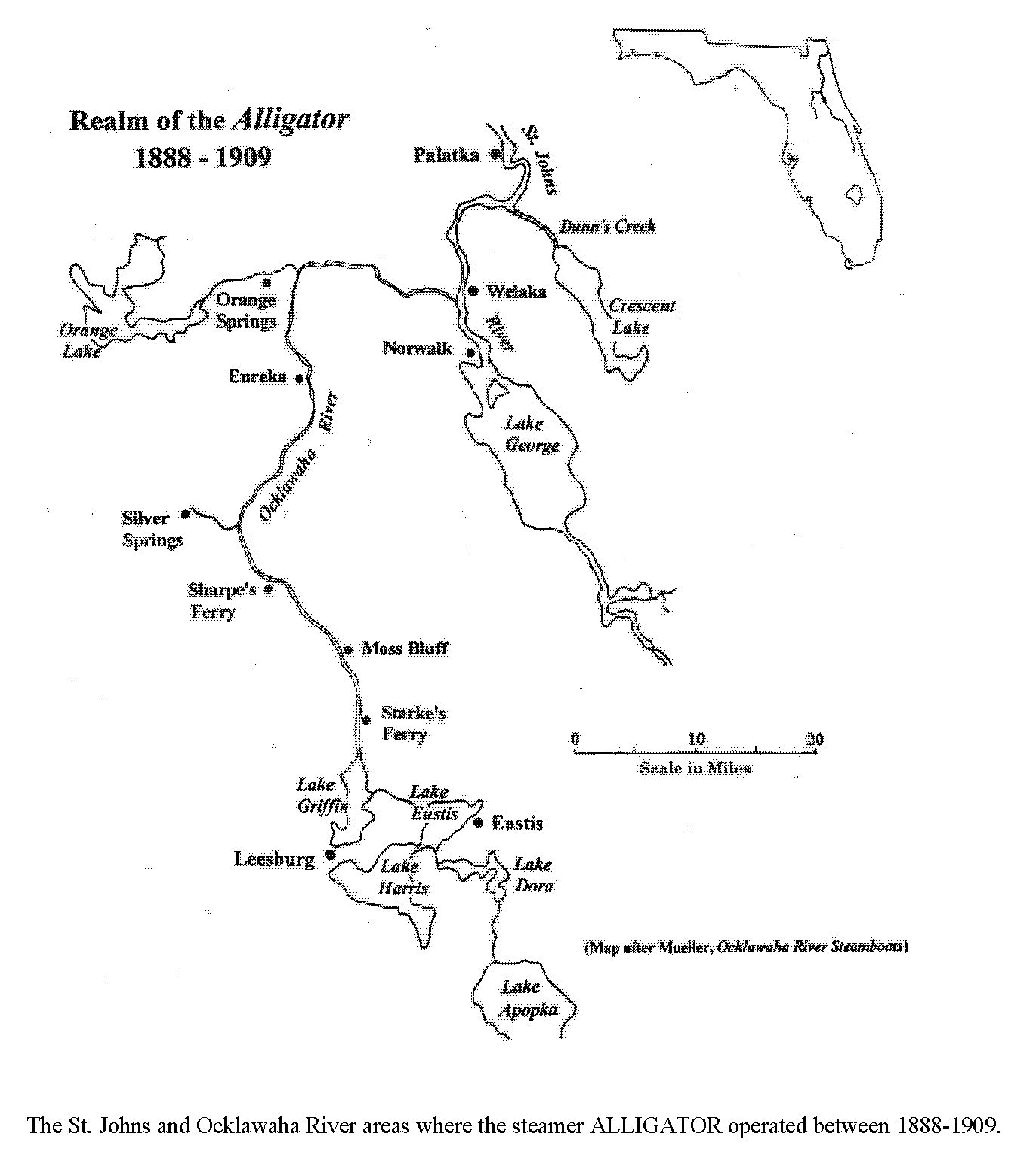
Route of the Alligator on the St. Johns and Ocklawaha rivers

During the final decades of the 19th century and early in the 20th century, small paddle-steamers transported freight and tourists back and forth between the upper areas of Florida to the headwaters of lakes in Central Florida. In 1888, Captain Howard added the Alligator to his small fleet of vessels that ran on the St. Johns and Ocklawaha rivers providing passenger and freight service. The Wade brothers bought Alligator on 9 September 1889, and a year later they sold it to Joseph Edward Lucas who owned the steamboat during most of the time of its operation. When Lucas purchased the steamer, he ran a small passenger and freight business out of Palatka, Florida.

In April 1891, Clarence Bloomfield Moore contracted with Lucas to use the steamer to explore the St. Johns River and tributaries for his archeological exploration for Native American artifacts. Moore used the paddle-steamer as his base of operation for his annual field work between 1891 and 1895. Moore kept a detailed log of his research that notes the travel of the Alligator during his excursions. In 1895, the Jacksonville Florida Times Union noted Moore's final excursion on the Alligator reporting that Moore accompanied by a crew from the Academy of Natural Sciences were exploring Indian mounds along the Ocklawaha.

In 1894, Lucas expanded his holdings of steamboats to compete with the Hart Line. The Alligator in the expanded form gave the company several steamers well-equipped to transport citrus fruit freight and passengers for winter tourist travel on the Silver Springs run. Cold temperatures caused hard economic conditions for both companies. The companies had losses in citrus freight transport and the tourism business. In December 1895, the Palatka Times Herald reported the Hart Line reached an agreement to consolidate with Lucas Line. The arrangement was not a merger of the two companies but an agreement to consolidate the businesses to "maximize the profit of both companies". Both companies survived and went on to compete for almost another decade.

The Lucas Line's main source of income, the Metamora steamboat, sank in 1903 causing the company severe financial problems. Alligator was sold on 7 December 1903 to Charles Leonard after the court foreclosure on the boats and other assets. Immediately, Leonard sold the vessel to Captain Peter Cone of Palatka. Cone put the paddle-steamer out of service until November 1905, when he sold the Alligator to Lawrence Dozier and Allen Gibson doing business as "Dozier and Gibson of Eustis". The steamboat operated on the Ocklawaha River and headwaters lakes Lake Eustis at Eustis, and lakes Harris and Griffin at Leesburg. On 13 March 1906, while on a run between Leesburg and Silver Springs, the Alligator struck a snag and sank. There were no injuries among the passengers or crew. The vessel was rebuilt with a configuration suitable for local runs and back in operation again with a single owner, Dozier.

T. Hurd Kooker acquired the Alligator from John F. Horr U.S. Marshall in a sale recorded on 24 April 1909, indicating a forced sale by the court. Kooker operated the paddle-steamer on local lakes until a 1909 fire permanently took the steamboat out of operation.

== Sinking ==
Around midnight on 5 November 1909, the steamer caught fire, burned, and sank. A wreck report written on 20 November 1909 indicates that fire occurred with only two watchmen aboard, and there were no human injuries. The written record is inexact about the location where the steamer is submerged. There is no indication from the canvassing of the Certificate of Enrollment that the wreck was recovered and put back into service again.

=== Search for wreckage ===
On 9 December 2008, a group of volunteers led by scientists from the Lighthouse Archaeological Maritime Program in St. Augustine, Florida, searched the east side of Crescent Lake for the sunken wreckage of the Alligator, though the search was unfruitful.
