= Lulu, Florida =

- Unincorporated community
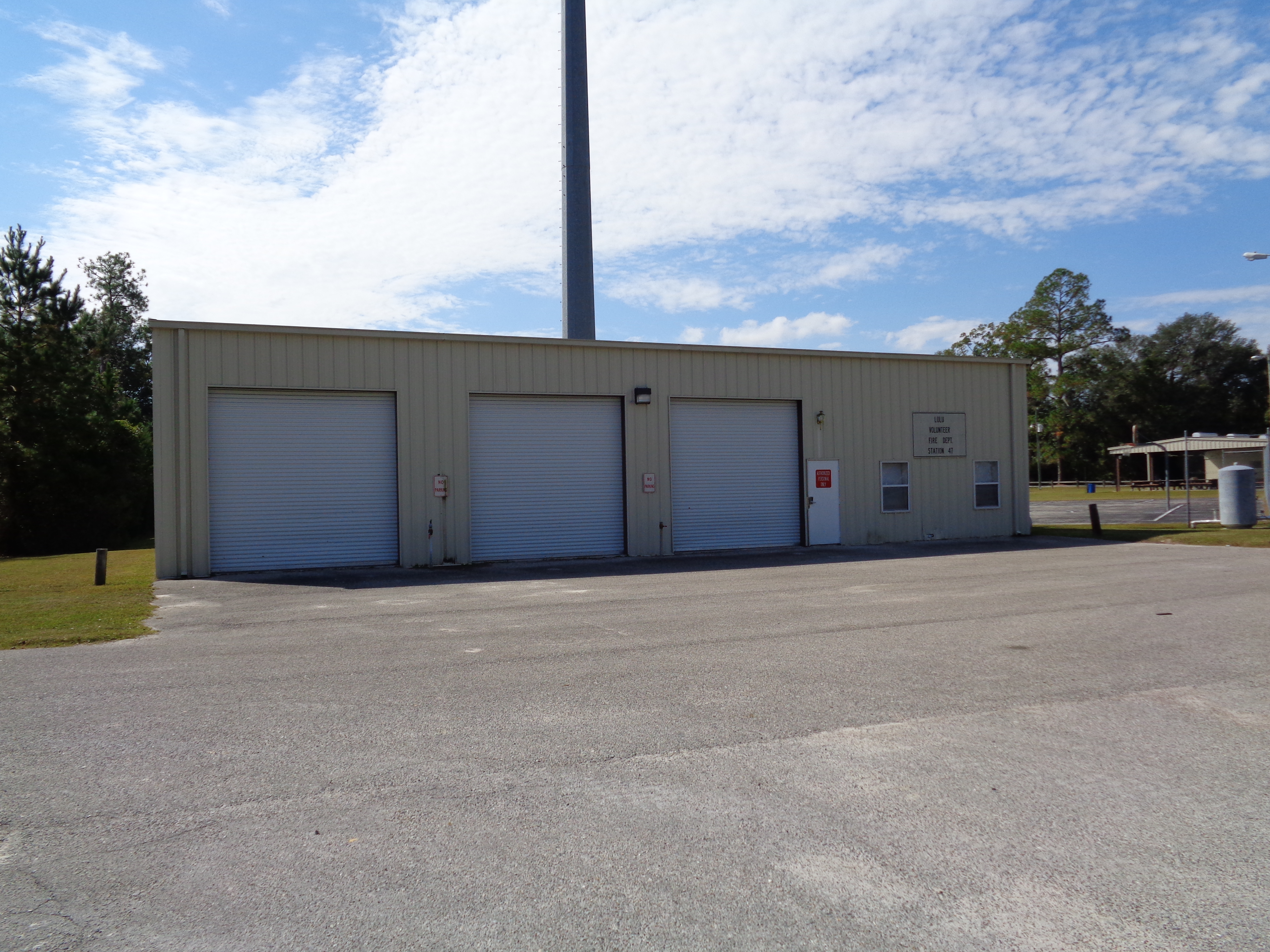
- Lulu Volunteer Fire Department Station 47

- Location within Florida
- Coordinates: 30°06′27″N 82°29′28″W
- Country: United States
- State: Florida
- County: Columbia
- Elevation: 154 ft (47 m)
- Time zone: UTC-5 (Eastern (EST))
  - Summer (DST): UTC-4 (EDT)
- ZIP code: 32061
- Area code: 386
- GNIS feature ID: 286209

Lulu is an unincorporated community in Columbia County, Florida, United States. Lulu is located on State Road 100, 10.5 miles (16.9 km) east-southeast of Lake City. The former right-of-way for the Georgia Southern and Florida Railway runs along the south side of SR 100 in Lulu.

== History ==
A post office called Lulu was established in 1891, and remained in operation until being discontinued in 1976. Lulu was the name of the first postmaster's love interest.
