= Crescent Lake (Florida) =

Lake in Florida, United States of America

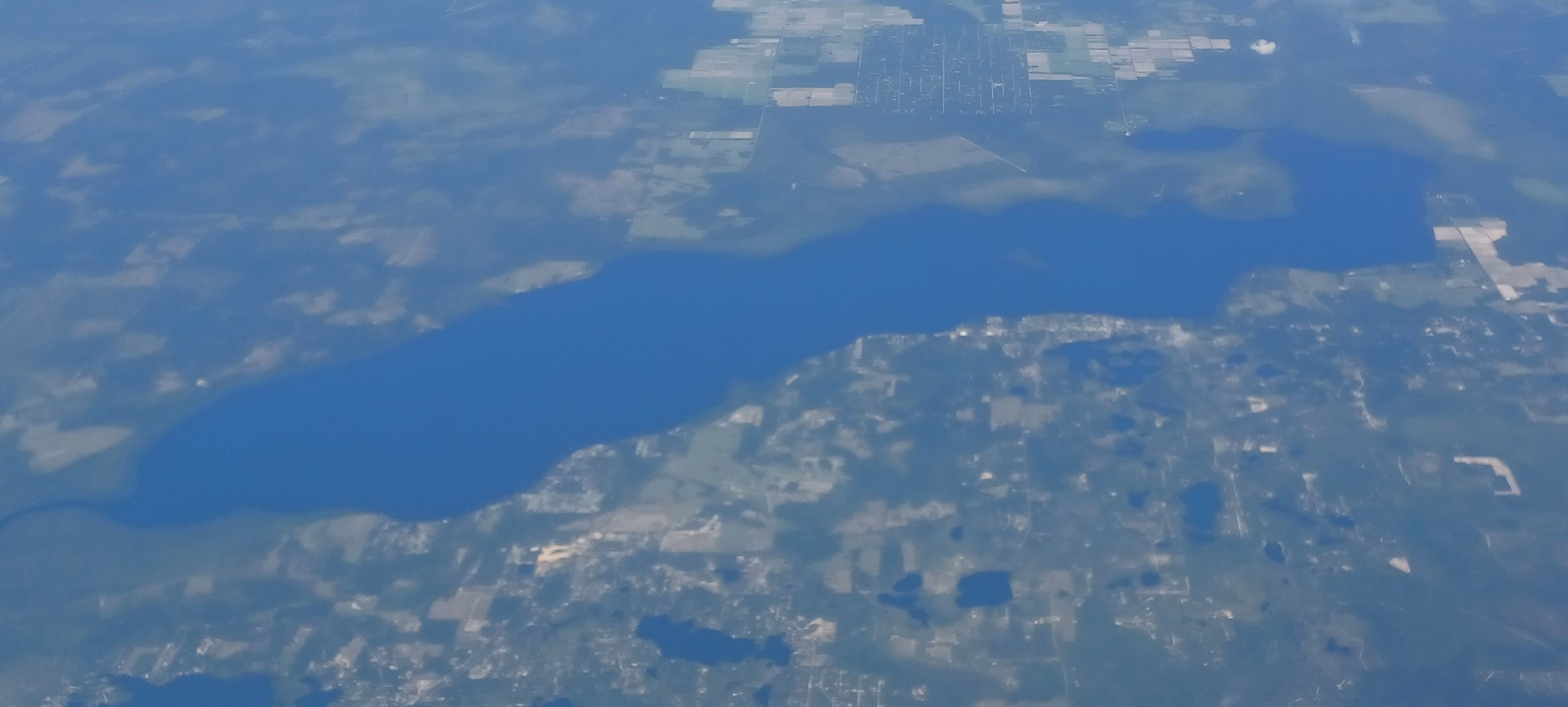
- Aerial view

- Location within Florida Location within the United States
- Location: Flagler / Putnam counties, Florida, United States
- Coordinates: 29.4635°N 81.5007°W
- Basin countries: United States
- Max. length: 13 mi (21 km)
- Max. width: 2 mi (3.2 km)
- Surface area: 15,960 acres (6,460 ha)

Crescent Lake is a 15,960-acre (64.6 km^{2}) freshwater lake located in Putnam and Flagler counties in North Central Florida. The lake is approximately 13 miles (21 km) in length and 2 miles (3.2 km) wide. At the north end it connects to the St. Johns River by way of Dunns Creek.

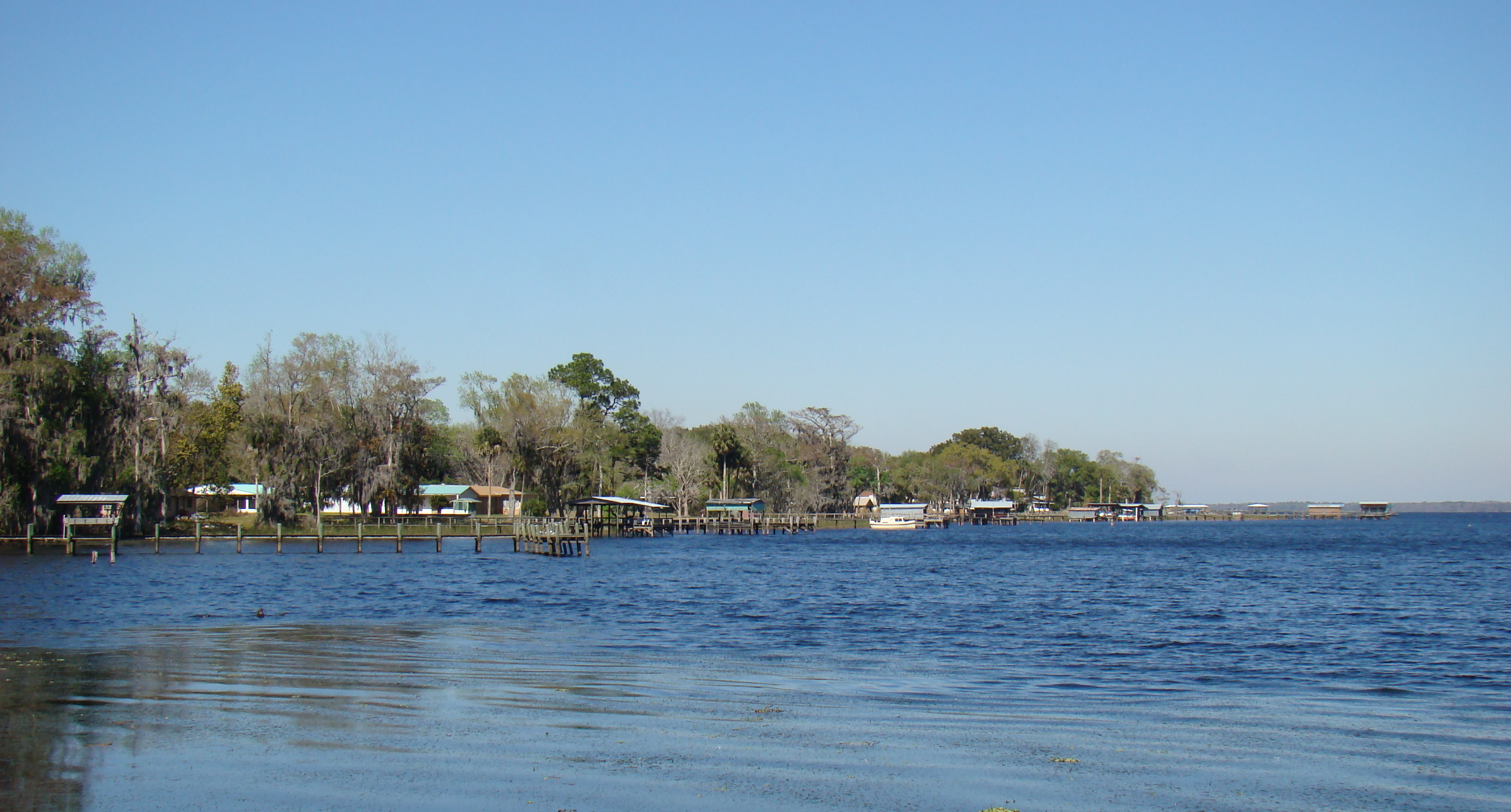
Crescent Lake

== Geology ==
Crescent Lake has a long and narrow shape similar to a crescent.

== History ==
Crescent Lake was formerly known as Dunn's Lake.

== Search for wreckage of the Alligator ==
On December 9, 2008, a group of volunteers led by scientists from the Lighthouse Archaeological Maritime Program in St. Augustine, Florida searched the east side of Crescent Lake for the sunken wreckage of the Alligator.
