= New River (Santa Fe River tributary) =

Tributary of the Santa Fe River in northern Florida, US

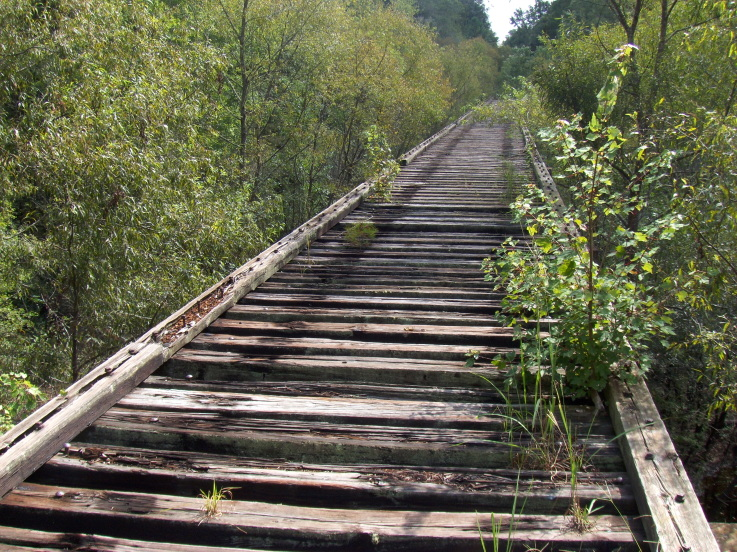
- Old railroad trestle over the New River, future route of Palatka-Lake Butler State Trail as well as the Florida National Scenic Trail

Location
- Country: United States
- State: Florida

Physical characteristics
- Source: New River Swamp
  - location: Baker County
  - coordinates: 30°10′02″N 82°07′58″W
- Mouth: Santa Fe River
  - coordinates: 29°55′14″N 82°25′05″W
  - elevation: 49 ft (15 m)
- Length: 31 mi (50 km)

New River is a 31-mile-long (50 km) tributary of the Santa Fe River in northern Florida, United States. The river was used as the border to create Union County from Bradford County (formerly New River County, Florida) in 1921.

The Palatka-Lake Butler State Trail, a multi-use recreational trail that includes a portion of the Florida National Scenic Trail, will, when completed, cross the New River southeast of the town of Lake Butler. The Florida Trail currently crosses the New River along State Road 100.

An application from HSP Enterprises to mine phosphate from a 7,400-acre (3,000 ha) tract spanning the New River has met opposition from local residents. As of January 2018, Bradford County was reviewing the application, while Union County had placed a moratorium on mining applications until February 2019.
