= Yelvington, Florida =

Unincorporated community in Florida, U.S.

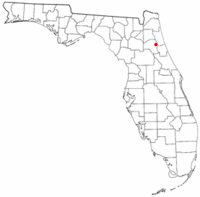

Yelvington is an unincorporated community in Putnam County, Florida, United States. It is located east of the Putnam County Fairgrounds in East Palatka, Florida.

== Geography ==
Yelvington is located at 29°37′57″N 81°31′40″W.
