= Bardin, Florida =

Coordinates: 29°42′52″N 81°43′29″W

- Interactive map of Bardin, Florida
- County: Putnam County
- Elevation: 7.9 m (26 ft)

Population (2007)
  - Total: 424
- Time zone: UTC-5 (EST)
  - Summer (DST): UTC-4 (EDT)
- GNIS ID: 294665

Bardin is an unincorporated community in Putnam County, Florida, United States, located northwest of the city of Palatka. It was named after Hazard Bardin (1856-1934) circa 1900. He was the first resident and operated a turpentine distillery business at the interception of Bardin Road and the creek.
