= Peter Monroe Hagan =

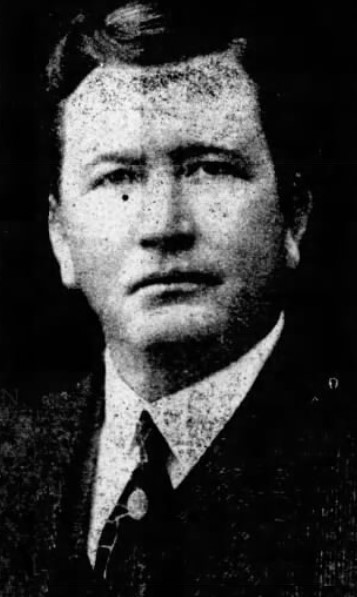
- Hagan c. 1916
- Born: October 15, 1871; Bradford County, Florida, United States
- Died: October 24, 1930 (aged 59); Palatka, Florida
- Occupations: Sheriff of Putnam County, Florida
- Years active: 1916–1924 and 1928–1930
- Known for: Opposition to mob violence and the Ku Klux Klan

Peter Monroe Hagan (October 15, 1871 – October 24, 1930) was an American law enforcement officer who served as Sheriff of Putnam County, Florida, in 1916–1924 and 1928–1930. He is known for opposing the Ku Klux Klan and mob violence in the county in the violent period between 1915 and 1930. His thwarting of lynching attempts and his winning the pivotal 1928 election became a referendum against Klan and mob violence.

== Early life ==
Hagan was born on October 15, 1871, in Bradford County, Florida, to J.C. Hagan and Annie Jane Swindle. He was the 14th of 16 children. He had a minimal education in his youth. On March 24, 1895, he married Sallie Mary Cannon.

== Career ==
=== Early career ===
When he was fourteen, Hagan left his parents' home and found work at a grocery store in Palatka. After about a year he was hired as a night policeman for the city. After four years of this work he was elected police chief of Palatka, serving in the office for 11 years and seven months. Sheriff of Putnam County R.L. Kennerly subsequently appointed Hagan his chief deputy.

After five years of service with the sheriff's office Hagan was appointed deputy U.S. Marshal in the Southern District of Florida. Following one year in this position he was made deputy internal revenue collector, where he worked for two years.

=== Sheriff ===
Hagan initially considered seeking the appointment to the office of U.S. Marshal for the Southern District, but decided to forgo this to run for the office of Sheriff of Putnam County in 1916. He won the contest with a large majority, defeating four other candidates. In the aftermath of World War I mob violence directed by the Ku Klux Klan and other white vigilantes against blacks, Catholics and women they accused of transgressing the social order was on the increase. This combined with Prohibition led to the highest crime rates in Putnam County's history. Hagan was faced with two lynching attempts in 1919 alone, after which he wrote in the Palatka Daily News:

I want to say to the people of Palatka that there will be no repetition of this affair, and any effort on the part of outsiders to come here and create disorder and engender ill-feeling between the two races will be met with force sufficient to stop it where it begins … We have determined to see that the colored people of this town and county get the protection to which they are entitled, and that no hoodlums can come here and cowardly attack old and innocent colored men without having justice meted out to them for their offense.

He was re-elected with a large plurality over three opponents in June 1920, but racist mob violence only continued to increase.

==== Attempted lynching of Arthur Johnson ====
In March 1923, a band of white road crew workers from Gainesville attempted to storm the Putnam County Jail with the intention of lynching Arthur Johnson, a black man awaiting trial on accusations of murdering their white co-worker Hugh C. Cross. The sheriff's official residence was on the site of the county jail. When Hagan opened the door he found the mob standing before him with guns and rope. He struck one man on the head with his pistol before shutting the door. The mob was surprised by the action and opened fire on the building, striking Hagan in the hand, but eventually departed. Hagan notified Sheriff Ramsey in Alachua County of the incident, leading to the arrest of eighteen men on their way back to Gainesville. Hagan was praised by state legislators and the press for his actions in stopping the attack, but of the eighteen culprits arrested only nine made it to trial and they were swiftly acquitted by the white jury.

==== Defeat and re-election ====
In 1924 Hagan was challenged for his office in the Democratic primary by two men with ties to the Klan. Announcing his campaign for re-election on March 7, 1924, Hagan stated his position on the Ku Klux Klan:

I am not, and would not be a member, however, of any organization which appears to differ in policies from those who do not belong to its ranks, for the reason that as Sheriff I believe it to be my duty to be perfectly free to serve all of the people and not an organized part of them; I wish to feel perfectly free to perform my duties without obligations to any order, however high the ideals of such order may be. I have no personal quarrel with the Klan; many of its members are my friends whom I respect and honor, but as Sheriff, I am free, and will remain free to administer the law impartially to all.

Hagan was ultimately defeated and replaced by R. J. Hancock. The KKK would reach the peak of its local influence two years later, but by 1928 public opinion was shifting and Sheriff Hagan was voted back into office after a four-year absence. He suffered a cerebral hemorrhage and died on October 24, 1930, at his home in Palatka.

== Works cited ==
- Cutler, Harry Gardner (1923). History of Florida: Past and Present, Historical and Biographical. Vol. 2. Lewis Publishing Company.
