= Putnam County, Florida =

County in Florida, United States

- County
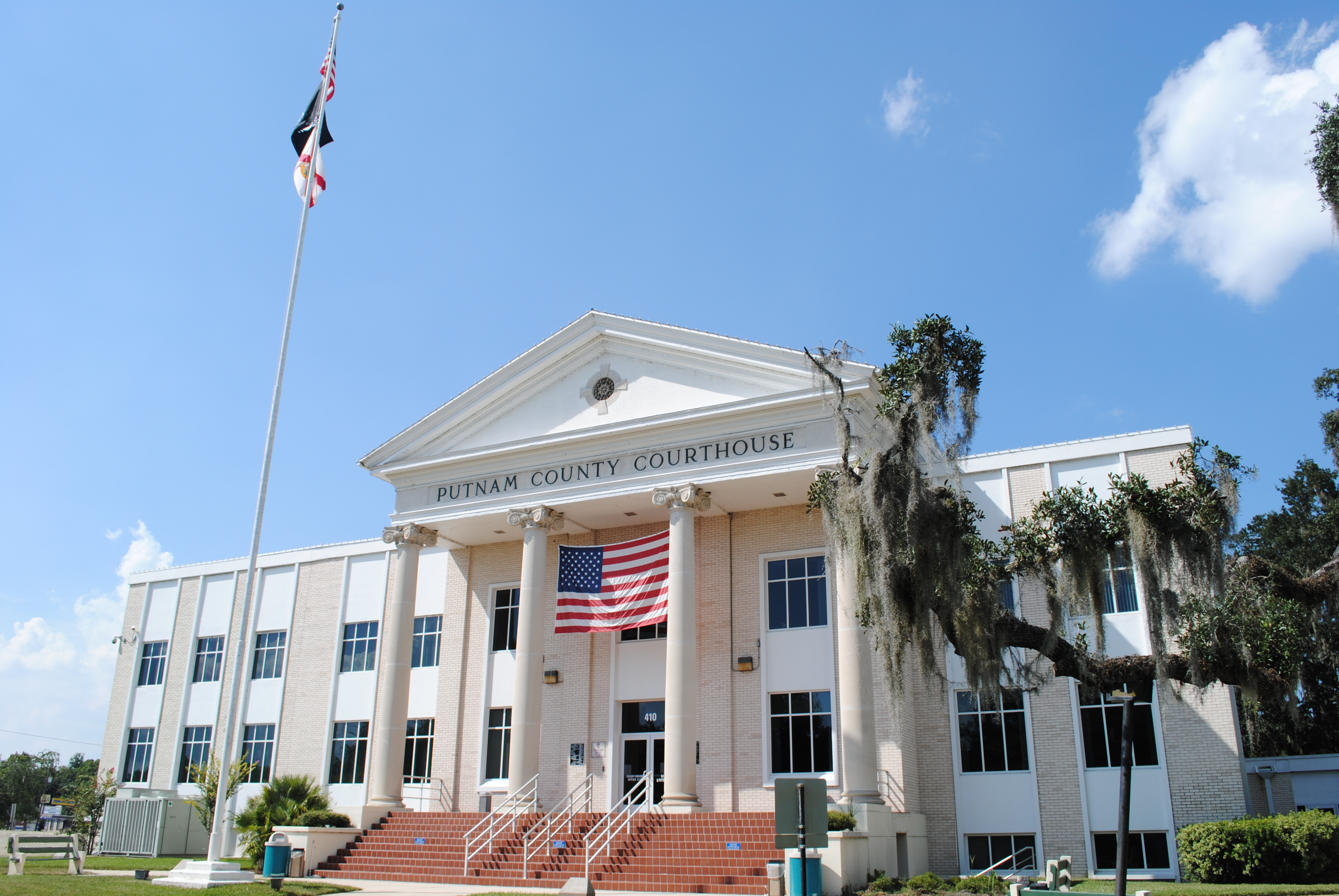
- Putnam County Courthouse

- Flag Seal

- Location within the U.S. state of Florida
- Coordinates: 29°37′N 81°44′W
- Country: United States
- State: Florida
- Founded: January 18, 1849
- Named for: Benjamin Alexander Putnam
- Seat: Palatka
- Largest city: Palatka

Area
  - Total: 827 sq mi (2,140 km^{2})
  - Land: 728 sq mi (1,890 km^{2})
  - Water: 99 sq mi (260 km^{2}) 12.0%

Population (2020)
  - Total: 73,321
  - Estimate (2025): 77,734 ▲
  - Density: 101/sq mi (38.9/km^{2})
- Time zone: UTC−5 (Eastern)
  - Summer (DST): UTC−4 (EDT)
- Congressional district: 6th
- Website: www.putnam-fl.gov

Putnam County is a county located in the northern part of the state of Florida. As of the 2020 census, its population was 73,321. Its county seat is Palatka. Putnam County comprises the Palatka, Florida micropolitan statistical area, which is included in the Jacksonville—Kingsland—Palatka, Florida—Georgia combined statistical area. The county is centrally located between Jacksonville, Gainesville, St. Augustine, and Daytona Beach.

== History ==
Putnam County was created in 1849. It was Florida's 28th county created from parts of St. Johns, Alachua, Orange, Duval, and Marion counties. The county was named for Benjamin A. Putnam, who was an officer in the First Seminole War, a lawyer, Florida legislator, and the first president of the Florida Historical Society. The Putnam County Historical Society has determined that Benjamin A. Putnam is the grandson of Israel Putnam, for whom other counties and places in the United States are named. Benjamin A. Putnam died in the county seat of Palatka in 1869.

== Geography ==
According to the U.S. Census Bureau, the county has a total area of 827 square miles (2,140 km^{2}), of which 99 sq mi (260 km^{2}) (12.0%) are covered by water.

The county contains various sinkhole lakes, such as Lake Barco and Lake Suggs, where unconsolidated deposits on the surface have slumped into the highly soluble limestone of the upper Floridan aquifer.

=== Adjacent counties ===
- Clay County, Florida – north
- St. Johns County, Florida – northeast
- Flagler County, Florida – east
- Volusia County, Florida – southeast
- Marion County, Florida – southwest
- Alachua County, Florida – west
- Bradford County, Florida – northwest

=== National protected area ===
- Ocala National Forest (part)

=== State Park ===
- Ravine Gardens
- Dunns Creek

== Demographics ==
Historical population
Census	Pop.	Note	%±
1850	687		—
1860	2,712		294.8%
1870	3,821		40.9%
1880	6,261		63.9%
1890	11,186		78.7%
1900	11,641		4.1%
1910	13,096		12.5%
1920	14,568		11.2%
1930	18,096		24.2%
1940	18,698		3.3%
1950	23,615		26.3%
1960	32,212		36.4%
1970	36,290		12.7%
1980	50,549		39.3%
1990	65,070		28.7%
2000	70,423		8.2%
2010	74,364		5.6%
2020	73,321		−1.4%
2025 (est.)	77,734	▲	6.0%
U.S. Decennial Census; 1790–1960 1900–1990; 1990–2000 2010–2019

=== 2020 census ===
As of the 2020 census, 73,321 people and 18,179 families were residing in the county; the median age was 46.8 years, with 20.6% of residents under the age of 18 and 24.1% of residents 65 years of age or older. For every 100 females there were 98.0 males, and for every 100 females age 18 and over there were 96.1 males.

The racial makeup of the county was 71.4% White, 15.6% Black or African American, 0.6% American Indian and Alaska Native, 0.7% Asian, 0.1% Native Hawaiian and Pacific Islander, 4.6% from some other race, and 7.1% from two or more races. Hispanic or Latino residents of any race comprised 10.7% of the population.

27.3% of residents lived in urban areas, while 72.7% lived in rural areas.

There were 29,569 households in the county, of which 26.0% had children under the age of 18 living in them. Of all households, 43.0% were married-couple households, 20.3% were households with a male householder and no spouse or partner present, and 28.5% were households with a female householder and no spouse or partner present. About 28.8% of all households were made up of individuals and 15.6% had someone living alone who was 65 years of age or older.

There were 36,014 housing units, of which 17.9% were vacant. Among occupied housing units, 74.6% were owner-occupied and 25.4% were renter-occupied. The homeowner vacancy rate was 2.3% and the rental vacancy rate was 8.4%.

=== Racial and ethnic composition ===
Putnam County, Florida – Racial and ethnic composition Note: the US Census treats Hispanic/Latino as an ethnic category. This table excludes Latinos from the racial categories and assigns them to a separate category. Hispanics/Latinos may be of any race.
Race / Ethnicity (NH = Non-Hispanic)	Pop 1980	Pop 1990	Pop 2000	Pop 2010	Pop 2020	% 1980	% 1990	% 2000	% 2010	% 2020
White alone (NH)	39,492	51,150	53,087	53,981	50,541	78.13%	78.61%	75.38%	72.59%	68.93%
Black or African American alone (NH)	10,261	11,874	11,898	11,842	11,274	20.30%	18.25%	16.90%	15.92%	15.38%
Native American or Alaska Native alone (NH)	97	119	265	271	280	0.19%	0.18%	0.38%	0.36%	0.38%
Asian alone (NH)	59	220	294	444	469	0.12%	0.34%	0.42%	0.60%	0.64%
Native Hawaiian or Pacific Islander alone (NH)	x	x	27	36	37	x	x	0.04%	0.05%	0.05%
Other race alone (NH)	45	19	40	80	248	0.09%	0.03%	0.06%	0.11%	0.34%
Mixed race or Multiracial (NH)	x	x	644	1,004	2,656	x	x	0.91%	1.35%	3.62%
Hispanic or Latino (any race)	595	1,688	4,168	6,706	7,816	1.18%	2.59%	5.92%	9.02%	10.66%
Total	50,549	65,070	70,423	74,364	73,321	100.00%	100.00%	100.00%	100.00%	100.00%

=== 2000 census ===
As of the 2000 United States census 70,423 people, 27,839 households, and 19,459 familieswere living in the county. The population density was 98 people per square mile (38 people/km^{2}). The 33,870 housing units had an average density of 47 per square mile (18/km^{2}). The racial makeup of the county was 77.91% White, 17.04% Black or African American, 0.42% Native American, 0.44% Asian, 2.98% from other races, and 1.20% from two or more races. About 5.92% of the population were Hispanic or Latino of any race.

Of the 27,839 households, 28.1% had children under 18 living with them, 52.8% were married couples living together, 12.9% had a female householder with no husband present, and 30.1% were not families. Around 25.1% of all households were made up of individuals, and 11.9% had someone living alone who was 65 or older. The average household size was 2.48 and the average family size was 2.95.

In the county, the age distribution of the population was 24.6% under 18, 7.7% from 18 to 24, 24.2% from 25 to 44, 25.1% from 45 to 64, and 18.5% who were 65 or older. The median age was 40 years. For every 100 females, there were 97.6 males. For every 100 females 18 and over, there were 94.2 males.

The median income for a household in the county was $28,180, and for a family was $34,499. Males had a median income of $29,975 versus $20,955 for females. The per capita income for the county was $15,603. About 15.80% of families and 20.90% of the population were below the poverty line, including 30.60% of those under age 18 and 13.10% of those age 65 or over.

=== Ancestry/ethnicity ===
As of 2017 the largest self-reported ethnic/ancestry groups in Putnam County, Florida are:

Largest ancestries (2017)	Percent
English	20.0%
German	9.5%
Irish	8.2%
"American"	8.0%
Polish	2.2%
Scottish	2.0%
Spaniard	1.7%
Scots-Irish	1.3%
Dutch	1.0%
Scottish	2.9%
Swedish	0.8%

== Education ==
The county's public primary and secondary schools are operated by the Putnam County School District (Florida). High schools in the county include:

- Crescent City High School
- Interlachen High School
- Palatka High School
- QI Roberts High School

St. Johns River State College has a full service campus with dorms in Palatka.

== Libraries ==
Putnam County is served by the Putnam County Library System which has five branches:

- Palatka (main)
- Bostwick
- Crescent City
- Interlachen
- Melrose

== Communities ==
=== Cities ===
- Crescent City
- Palatka (county seat)

=== Towns ===
- Interlachen
- Pomona Park
- Welaka

=== Census-designated place ===
- East Palatka

=== Other unincorporated communities ===
- Bardin
- Bostwick
- Carraway
- Crossley
- Edgar
- Florahome
- Francis
- Fruitland
- Georgetown
- Grandin
- Hollister
- Huntington
- Johnson Crossroads
- Lake Como
- Mannville
- Melrose
- Orange Mills
- Putnam Hall
- Ridgewood
- Rodman
- San Mateo
- Satsuma
- Springside
- Yelvington

== Politics ==
Up until the Civil Rights Act, Putnam County typically followed the Solid South pattern of voting Democratic, making exceptions for Herbert Hoover in 1928 (though a lot of White Southerners were against Democrat Al Smith due to his Northern Catholic background) and Dwight D. Eisenhower in the 1950s. The county also backed Independent segregationist George Wallace in 1968 and Democrat Jimmy Carter in both of his bids. Today a staunchly Republican county, the last Democratic presidential candidate to win Putnam was Bill Clinton, the last to come within single digits of doing so was Al Gore in 2000, and the last to garner 40% of the county vote was John Kerry in 2004.

United States presidential election results for Putnam County, Florida
Year	Republican		Democratic		Third party(ies)	
Year	No.	%	No.	%	No.	%
1904	210	25.83%	562	69.13%	41	5.04%
1908	454	30.88%	797	54.22%	219	14.90%
1912	229	19.51%	774	65.93%	171	14.57%
1916	418	28.67%	879	60.29%	161	11.04%
1920	1,181	40.51%	1,557	53.41%	177	6.07%
1924	574	35.13%	889	54.41%	171	10.47%
1928	2,105	63.01%	1,156	34.60%	80	2.39%
1932	911	28.29%	2,309	71.71%	0	0.00%
1936	975	26.47%	2,709	73.53%	0	0.00%
1940	1,008	22.47%	3,477	77.53%	0	0.00%
1944	1,163	28.44%	2,926	71.56%	0	0.00%
1948	1,435	29.68%	1,947	40.27%	1,453	30.05%
1952	3,766	51.65%	3,525	48.35%	0	0.00%
1956	4,212	56.58%	3,232	43.42%	0	0.00%
1960	4,236	48.72%	4,459	51.28%	0	0.00%
1964	5,072	50.38%	4,995	49.62%	0	0.00%
1968	2,955	26.80%	2,920	26.49%	5,150	46.71%
1972	8,741	74.61%	2,901	24.76%	74	0.63%
1976	5,040	34.03%	9,597	64.81%	172	1.16%
1980	8,273	46.67%	8,906	50.24%	548	3.09%
1984	11,435	59.37%	7,823	40.61%	4	0.02%
1988	11,624	57.24%	8,575	42.23%	108	0.53%
1992	8,910	34.72%	10,709	41.73%	6,042	23.55%
1996	9,786	38.91%	12,010	47.75%	3,356	13.34%
2000	13,457	51.29%	12,107	46.14%	675	2.57%
2004	18,311	59.12%	12,412	40.07%	250	0.81%
2008	19,637	59.01%	13,236	39.77%	406	1.22%
2012	19,326	61.50%	11,667	37.13%	431	1.37%
2016	22,138	66.48%	10,094	30.31%	1,069	3.21%
2020	25,514	70.05%	10,527	28.90%	381	1.05%
2024	26,700	73.41%	9,354	25.72%	316	0.87%

=== Voter registration ===
According to the Secretary of State's office, Republicans are a plurality of registered voters in Putnam County.

Putnam County Voter Registration & Party Enrollment as of July 31, 2022
Political Party	Total Voters	Percentage
Republican	24,092	47.92%
Democratic	15,516	30.86%
No party affiliation	9,990	19.87%
Minor parties	673	1.34%
Total	50,271	100.00%

=== Sheriff's office ===
The Putnam County Sheriff's Office is the primary law enforcement agency of Putnam County. It was established in 1849. The incumbent sheriff is H.D. "Gator" DeLoach III.

The Putnam County Sheriff's Office contains a K9 unit (with 4 German Shepherds), the Putnam County Jail, a SWAT unit, a marine unit and Underwater Search and Retrieval team along with a Drug and Vice unit.

According to ODMP, 1 officer of the Putnam County Sheriff's Office has been killed in the line of duty.

== Transportation ==
=== Airports ===
- The main airport within the county is the Palatka Municipal Airport. Minor and private air strips also exist.

=== Highways ===
- US 17 is the main local road through eastern Putnam County, running south to north.
- SR 15 is the hidden route for US 17 within the county and the vicinity.
- SR 19 is a mostly scenic north and south road that enters the county from Ocala National Forest and terminates with US 17 in Palatka.
- SR 20 runs west to east through the panhandle into Putnam County east from Hawthorne in Alachua County, and joins US 17/SR 100 in Palatka.
- SR 21 runs south to north from SR 20 in McMeekin through Melrose before entering Clay County.
- SR 26 runs west to east through Gilcrhist and Alachua Counties before entering Putnam County in Melrose and terminating at SR 100 in Putnam Hall.
- SR 100 runs northwest to southeast from Clay County southeast of Keystone Heights, passing through Putnam Hall, Florahome, and Palatka where it joins US 17, and later SR 20 in a concurrency into San Mateo where SR 100 (and hidden SR 20) runs southeast towards the Flagler County Line
- SR 207 is a west to east route that runs northeast from US 17/SRs 20/100 through Orange Mills and then the St. Johns County Line.

=== Rail transport ===
The historic Old Atlantic Coast Line Union Depot is the current Amtrak station in Palatka for Putnam County along the CSX Sanford Subdivision. Originally the station not only served the Atlantic Coast Line Railroad but also served the Seaboard Air Line Railroad, the Southern Railway, Florida East Coast Railroad, and the Ocklawaha Valley Railroad. Additionally, the Edgar Spur of the CSX Wildwood Subdivision enters the western edge of the county from Alachua County.

=== Navigable waterways ===
- St. Johns River

== Notable people ==
- Peter Monroe Hagan (1871–1930), law enforcement officer and served as Putnam County Sheriff.
- A. Philip Randolph (1889–1979), black rights activist. Born in the city of Crescent City in South Putnam.

== See also ==
- Drayton Island
- National Register of Historic Places listings in Putnam County, Florida
- Putnam County, New York
