= Bostwick, Florida =

- Interactive map of Bostwick, Florida
- County: Putnam County
- Elevation: 9.1 m (30 ft)
- Time zone: UTC-5 (EST)
  - Summer (DST): UTC-4 (EDT)
- ZIP code: 32007
- GNIS ID: 279266

Bostwick is an unincorporated community in Putnam County, Florida, United States, located north of the city of Palatka on U.S. Route 17. It hosts the Bostwick Blueberry Festival annually, in April.

== Geography ==
Bostwick is located at 29°46′26″N 81°38′14″W.

== Notable residents ==
- Emory H. Price; (December 3, 1899 – February 11, 1976) was a U.S. Representative from Florida.
