= Putnam County Courthouse (Florida) =

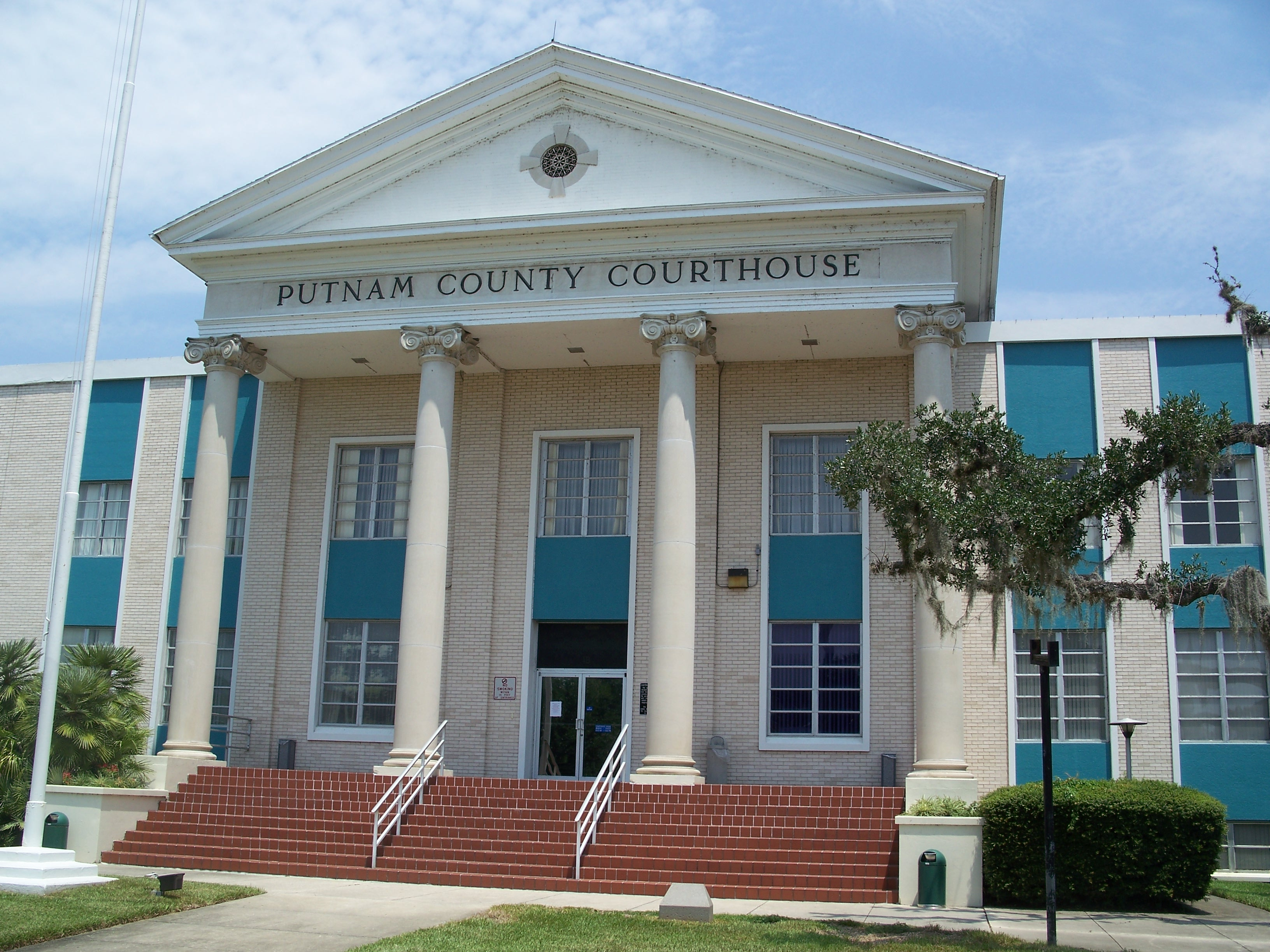
- Interactive map of the Putnam County Courthouse area

General information
- Architectural style: Classical Revival
- Location: 410 St. Johns Ave. Palatka, Florida, United States
- Coordinates: 29.647473°N 81.633259°W
- Completed: 1927

Design and construction
- Architect: H.G. Little of Wauchula
- Engineer: Builder: Robertson Construction Co.

The Putnam County Courthouse, built in 1909, is a historic brick courthouse building located at 410 St. Johns Avenue in Palatka, Florida It was designed by architects Robinson and Reidy in the Classical Revival style of architecture. C. D. Smith was the builder. It originally had a central cupola which is now gone. It has been extensively renovated and modernized over the years, with wings added on each side of the front portico.

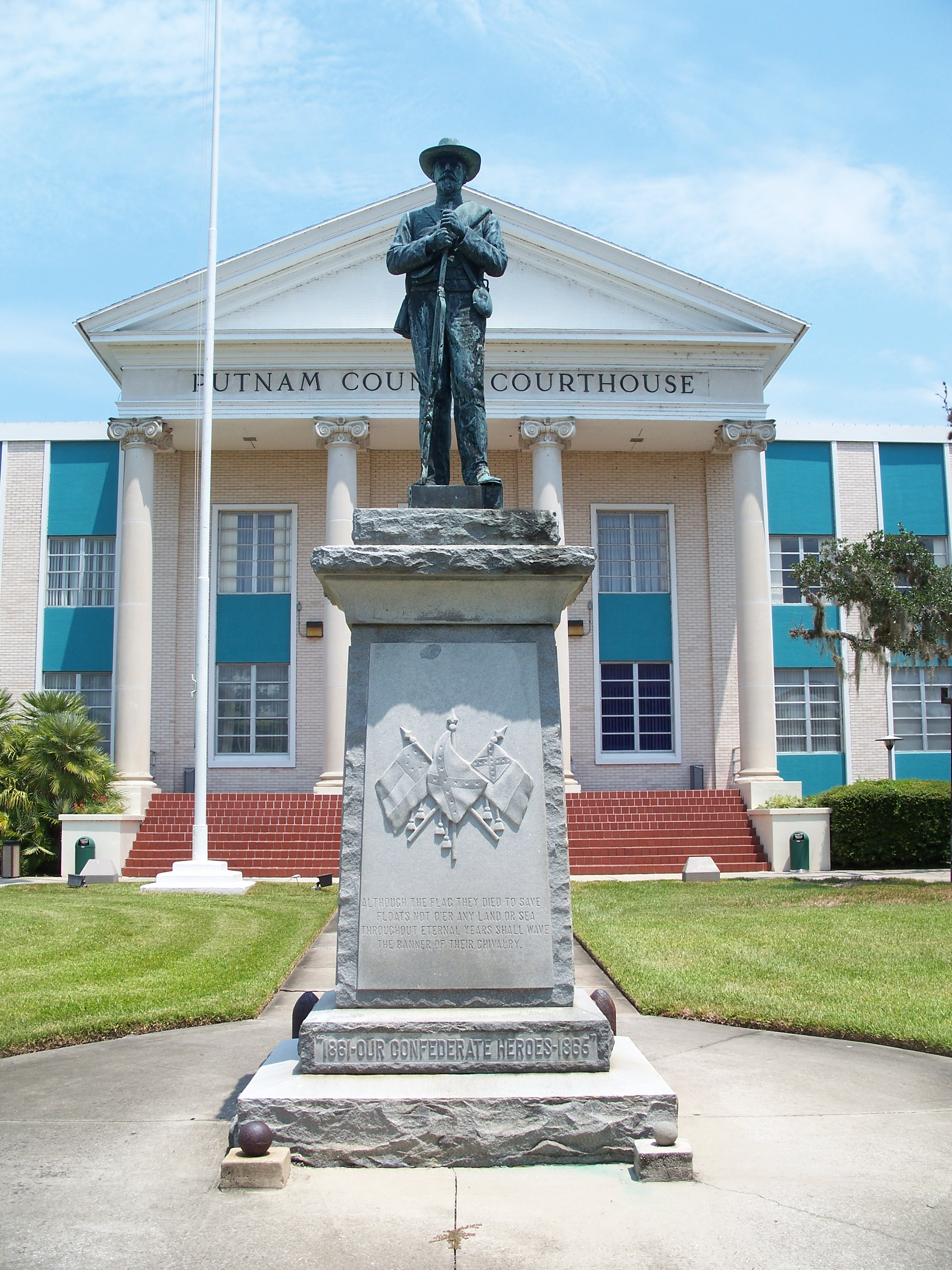
Confederate Monument. Putnam County Commissioners voted in August, 2020, to remove it.

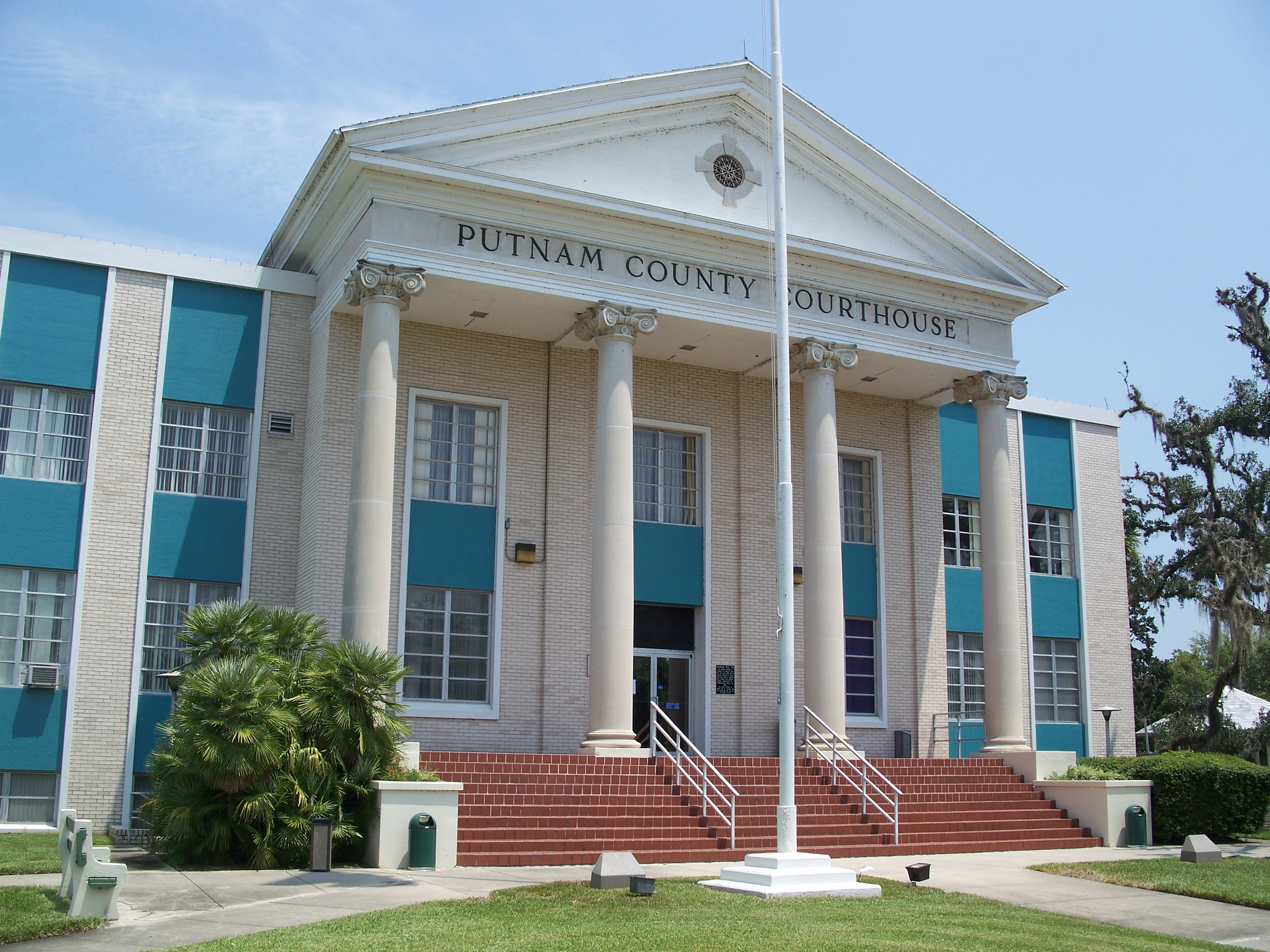

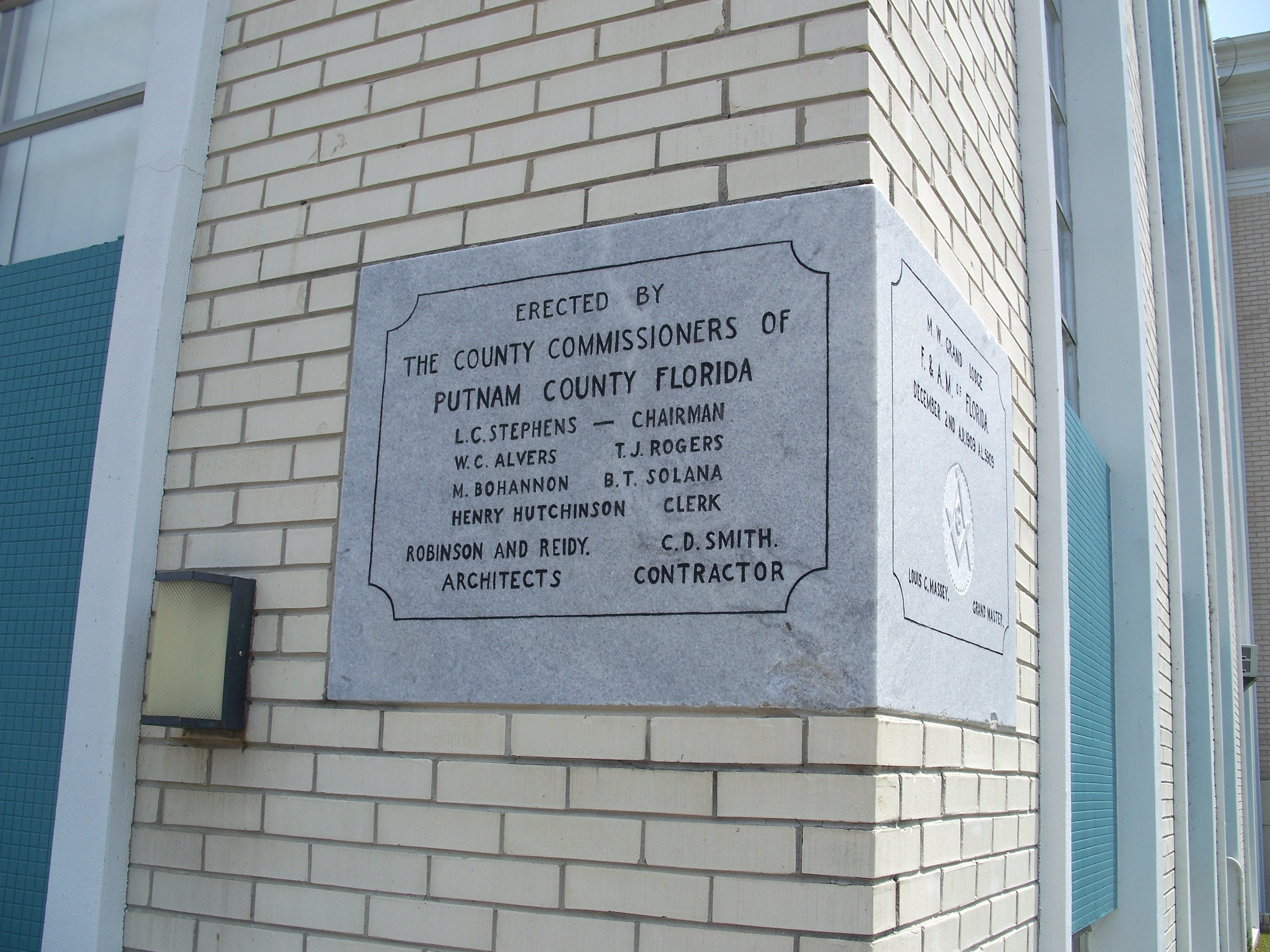
