= Ravine Gardens State Park =

State park in Palatka, Florida, US

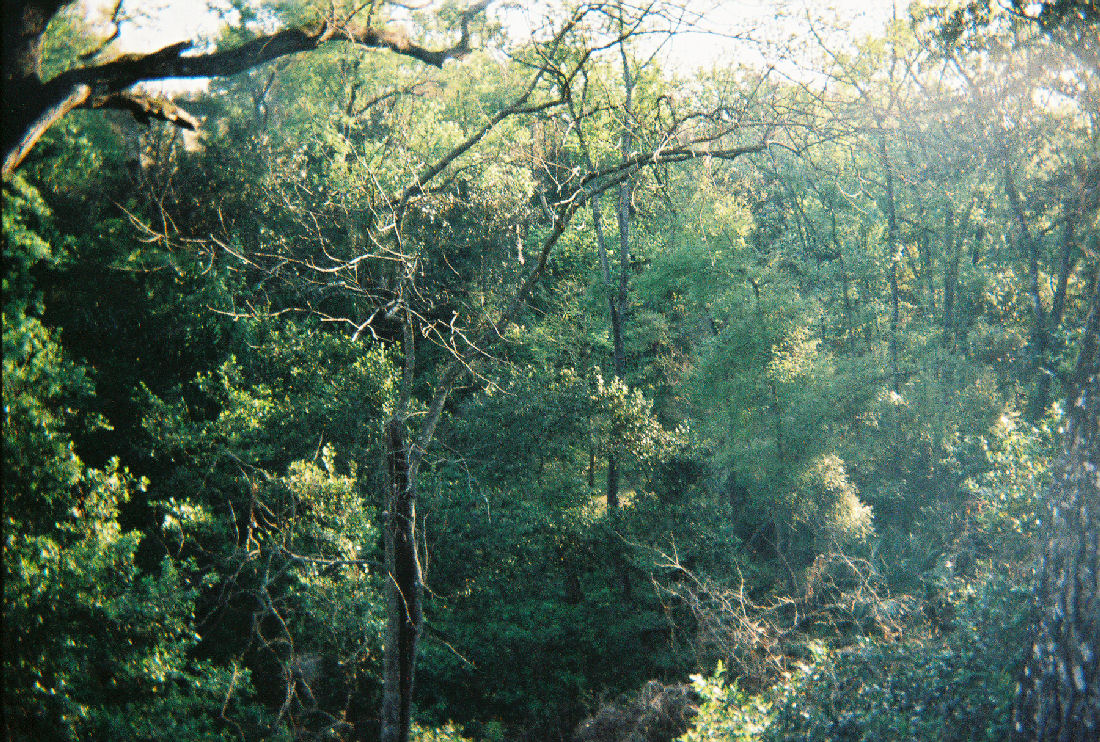
- A view of the ravine after sunrise

- Location within Florida Location within the United States
- Interactive map of Ravine Gardens State Park
- Location: 1600 Twigg St., Palatka, Florida
- Nearest city: Palatka
- Coordinates: 29°38′02″N 81°38′42″W
- Area: 57 acres (23 ha)
- Palatka Ravine Gardens Historic District
- U.S. National Register of Historic Places
- Area: 57 acres (23 ha)
- Built: 1933
- Built by: Works Progress Administration
- Landscape architect: Richard Forester
- Architectural style: Wood vernacular
- NRHP reference No.: 99000694
- Added to NRHP: June 10, 1999

Ravine Gardens State Park is a 59-acre (240,000 m^{2}) Florida State Park located in Palatka, Florida. It is listed on the National Register of Historic Places in 1999.

The park was constructed by the Works Progress Administration, with cypress buildings, rock gardens and fieldstone terraces. Near the park entrance is The Court of States and a 64-foot (20 m) obelisk dedicated to Franklin D. Roosevelt.

== Geology ==
The park's steephead ravines formed as groundwater seeped out of sandy slopes and eroded the sand, gradually extending the ravines into Palatka Hill.

== Recreational activities ==
Activities include viewing the thousands of plants and shrubs, picnicking, jogging, hiking and biking. Amenities include interpretive exhibits, picnic areas, gardens, hiking trails, a 1.8-mile (2.9 km) paved perimeter loop road, and a parcours trail. Visitors can rent a large covered pavilion, auditorium, and meeting rooms.

== Special events ==
The park is part of the annual Florida Azalea Festival the first weekend in March, when the nearly 100,000 plants that the WPA planted decades ago bloom.

== Hours ==
Florida state parks are open between 8 a.m. and sundown every day of the year (including holidays).

== Gallery ==
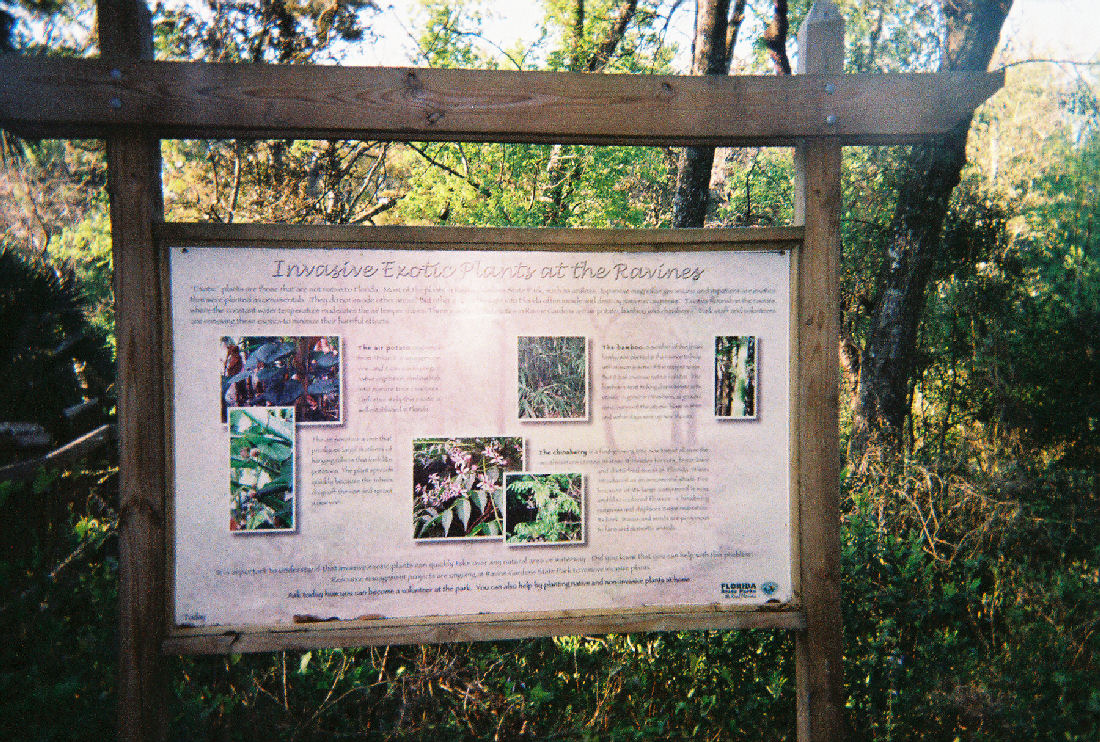
Information sign in the park

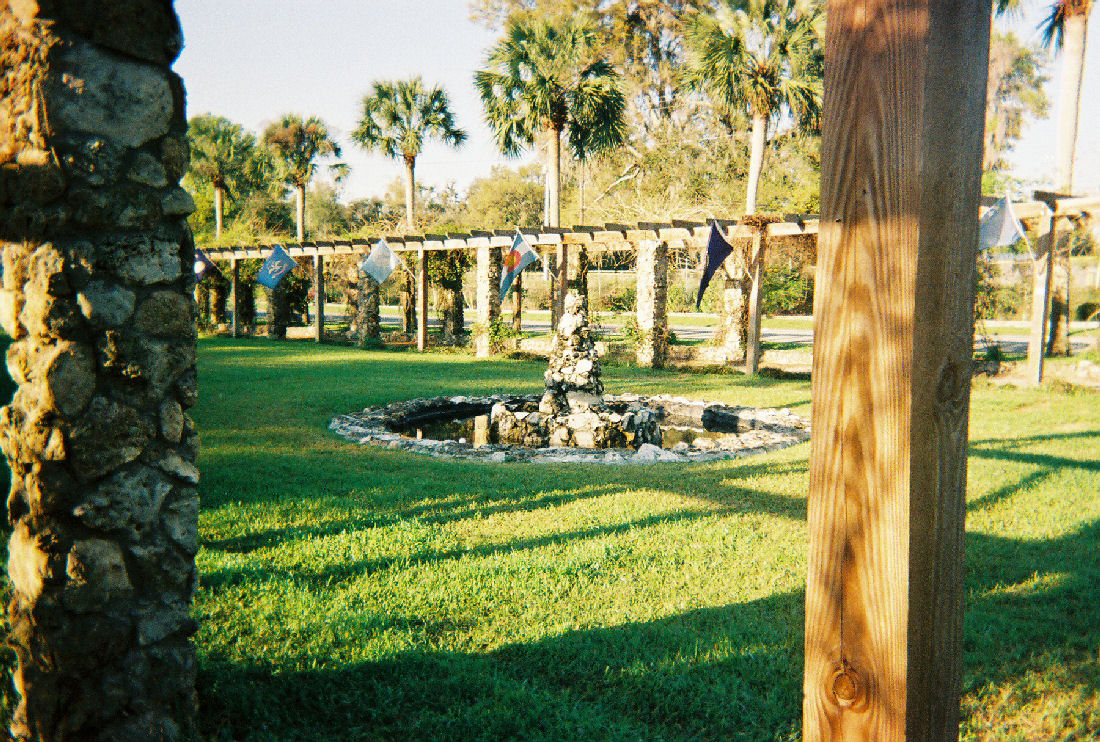
Fountain in the Court of States

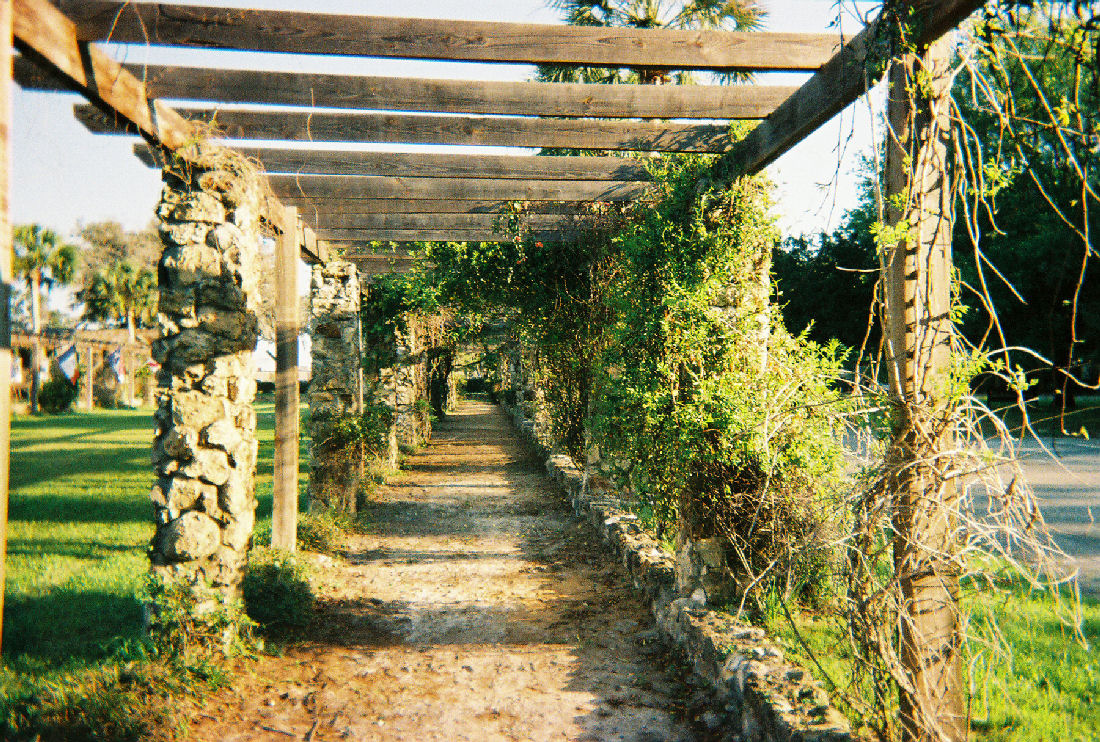
View down an open-air colonnade in the Court of States
