= Pomona Park, Florida =

Town in the state of Florida, United States

- Town
- Town of Pomona Park
- Seal
- Motto: "On Beautiful Lake Broward"
- Location in Putnam County and the state of Florida
- Coordinates: 29°29′56″N 81°35′32″W
- Country: United States
- State: Florida
- County: Putnam
- Settled (Pomona): c. 1869
- Incorporated (Town of Pomona): May 26, 1894
- Incorporated (Town of Pomona Park): May 17, 1945

Government
  - Type: Mayor-Council
  - Mayor: Anthony Cuevas
  - Mayor Pro Tem: CarrieAnn Evans
  - Council Members: Alisha Kuleski, Donna Cooney, Mark Swanson, Pat Mead, and Michael Rohrbaugh
  - Town Clerk: Andrea Almeida
  - Town Attorney: Leo Villegas

Area
  - Total: 3.44 sq mi (8.92 km^{2})
  - Land: 3.04 sq mi (7.88 km^{2})
  - Water: 0.40 sq mi (1.04 km^{2})
- Elevation: 39 ft (12 m)

Population (2020)
  - Total: 784
  - Density: 257.7/sq mi (99.48/km^{2})
- Time zone: UTC-5 (Eastern (EST))
  - Summer (DST): UTC-4 (EDT)
- ZIP code: 32181
- Area code: 386
- FIPS code: 12-58025
- GNIS feature ID: 2407145
- Website: pomonapark.com

Pomona Park is a town in Putnam County, Florida, United States. The town of Pomona Park is part of the Palatka, Florida Micropolitan Statistical Area. The population was 784 at the 2020 census, down from 912 at the 2010 census.

== Geography ==
According to the United States Census Bureau, the town has a total area of 3.3 square miles (8.5 km^{2}), of which 2.9 square miles (7.5 km^{2}) is land and 0.4 square miles (1.0 km^{2}) (12.01%) is water.

=== Climate ===
The climate in this area is characterized by hot, humid summers and generally mild winters. According to the Köppen climate classification, the Town of Pomona Park has a humid subtropical climate zone (Cfa).

== Demographics ==
Historical population
Census	Pop.	Note	%±
1910	301		—
1920	350		16.3%
1930	400		14.3%
1940	316		−21.0%
1950	443		40.2%
1960	516		16.5%
1970	578		12.0%
1980	791		36.9%
1990	663		−16.2%
2000	789		19.0%
2010	912		15.6%
2020	784		−14.0%
U.S. Decennial Census

=== 2010 and 2020 census ===
Pomona Park racial composition (Hispanics excluded from racial categories) (NH = Non-Hispanic)
Race	Pop 2010	Pop 2020	% 2010	% 2020
White (NH)	671	518	73.57%	66.07%
Black or African American (NH)	69	58	7.57%	7.40%
Native American or Alaska Native (NH)	4	1	0.44%	0.13%
Asian (NH)	11	2	1.21%	0.26%
Pacific Islander or Native Hawaiian (NH)	0	0	0.00%	0.00%
Some other race (NH)	0	12	0.00%	1.53%
Two or more races/Multiracial (NH)	17	34	1.86%	4.34%
Hispanic or Latino (any race)	140	159	15.35%	20.28%
Total	912	784		

As of the 2020 United States census, there were 784 people, 407 households, and 232 families residing in the town.

As of the 2010 United States census, there were 912 people, 393 households, and 231 families residing in the town.

=== 2000 census ===
As of the census of 2000, there were 789 people, 349 households, and 204 families residing in the town. The population density was 269.3 inhabitants per square mile (104.0/km^{2}). There were 433 housing units at an average density of 147.8 per square mile (57.1/km^{2}). The racial makeup of the town was 86.19% White, 10.90% African American, 0.51% Native American, 1.77% from other races, and 0.63% from two or more races. Hispanic or Latino of any race were 3.93% of the population.

In 2000, there were 349 households, out of which 22.3% had children under the age of 18 living with them, 45.8% were married couples living together, 7.7% had a female householder with no husband present, and 41.5% were non-families. 36.4% of all households were made up of individuals, and 18.6% had someone living alone who was 65 years of age or older. The average household size was 2.19 and the average family size was 2.81.

In 2000, in the town, the population was spread out, with 20.0% under the age of 18, 6.7% from 18 to 24, 23.7% from 25 to 44, 23.6% from 45 to 64, and 26.0% who were 65 years of age or older. The median age was 44 years. For every 100 females, there were 97.7 males. For every 100 females age 18 and over, there were 96.0 males.

In 2000, the median income for a household in the town was $25,536, and the median income for a family was $32,750. Males had a median income of $25,568 versus $15,469 for females. The per capita income for the town was $14,319. About 16.1% of families and 25.5% of the population were below the poverty line, including 32.3% of those under age 18 and 19.7% of those age 65 or over.
