= National Register of Historic Places listings in Clay County, Florida =

Location of Clay County in Florida

This is a list of the National Register of Historic Places listings in Clay County, Florida.

This is intended to be a complete list of the properties and districts on the National Register of Historic Places in Clay County, Florida, United States. The locations of National Register properties and districts for which the latitude and longitude coordinates are included below, may be seen in a map.

There are 24 properties and districts listed on the National Register in the county.

This National Park Service list is complete through NPS recent listings posted March 21, 2025.

Contents: Counties in Florida (non-linked contain no National Register listings)
Alachua - Baker - Bay - Bradford - Brevard - Broward - Calhoun - Charlotte - Citrus - Clay - Collier - Columbia - DeSoto - Dixie - Duval - Escambia - Flagler - Franklin - Gadsden - Gilchrist - Glades - Gulf - Hamilton - Hardee - Hendry - Hernando - Highlands - Hillsborough (Tampa) - Holmes - Indian River - Jackson - Jefferson - Lafayette - Lake - Lee - Leon - Levy - Liberty - Madison - Manatee - Marion - Martin - Miami-Dade (Miami) - Monroe - Nassau - Okaloosa - Okeechobee - Orange - Osceola - Palm Beach - Pasco - Pinellas - Polk - Putnam - St. Johns - St. Lucie - Santa Rosa - Sarasota - Seminole - Sumter - Suwannee - Taylor - Union - Volusia - Wakulla - Walton - Washington

== Current listings ==
	Name on the Register	Image	Date listed	Location	City or town	Description
1	Bubba Midden (8CL84)		March 2, 1990 (#90000159)	Address Restricted	Fleming Island	
2	Frosard W. Budington House	Frosard W. Budington House	March 9, 1990 (#90000317)	3916 Main Street; 30°04′08″N 81°51′45″W	Middleburg	Part of the Middleburg MPS
3	George A. Chalker House	George A. Chalker House	March 9, 1990 (#90000315)	2160 Wharf Street; 30°04′03″N 81°51′37″W	Middleburg	Part of the Middleburg MPS
4	Clark-Chalker House	Clark-Chalker House	October 5, 1988 (#88001701)	3891 Main Street; 30°04′07″N 81°51′37″W	Middleburg	
5	William Clarke Estate	William Clarke Estate	July 15, 1998 (#98000862)	1039-1057 Kingsley Avenue; 30°09′58″N 81°43′00″W	Orange Park	Part of the Orange Park, Florida MPS
6	Clay County Courthouse	Clay County Courthouse	June 20, 1975 (#75000546)	Brabantio Avenue; 29°59′28″N 81°41′06″W	Green Cove Springs	
7	George Randolph Frisbee Jr. House	George Randolph Frisbee Jr. House	March 9, 1990 (#90000316)	2125 Palmetto Street; 30°04′12″N 81°51′40″W	Middleburg	Part of the Middleburg MPS
8	Gold Head Branch State Park	Gold Head Branch State Park	July 21, 2020 (#100005381)	6239 FL 21; 29°49′55″N 81°57′11″W	Keystone Heights vicinity	
8	Green Cove Springs Historic District	Green Cove Springs Historic District	March 28, 1991 (#91000281)	Roughly bounded by Bay Street, the CSX railroad tracks, Center Street, Orange Avenue, St. Elmo Street, and the St. Johns River; 29°59′38″N 81°40′50″W	Green Cove Springs	
9	Joseph Green House	Joseph Green House	July 15, 1998 (#98000860)	531 McIntosh Avenue; 30°10′02″N 81°42′22″W	Orange Park	Part of the Orange Park, Florida MPS. Photo is of building on site. The house was demolished in 1999.
10	Haskell-Long House	Haskell-Long House	March 9, 1990 (#90000314)	3858 Main Street; 30°04′14″N 81°51′29″W	Middleburg	Part of the Middleburg MPS
11	William Helffrich House	William Helffrich House	July 15, 1998 (#98000857)	1200 Plainfield Avenue; 30°10′32″N 81°42′21″W	Orange Park	Part of the Orange Park, Florida MPS
12	Holly Cottage	Holly Cottage	July 8, 2010 (#10000442)	6935 Old Church Road; 30°03′54″N 81°41′48″W	Green Cove Springs vicinity	
13	Memorial Home Community Historic District	Memorial Home Community Historic District	February 3, 1999 (#99000047)	Roughly bounded by State Road 16, Caroline Boulevard, Wilbanks Avenue, and Studio Road; 29°58′56″N 81°48′29″W	Penney Farms	
14	Black Creek Methodist Church	Black Creek Methodist Church	March 9, 1990 (#90000318)	3925 Main Street; 30°04′04″N 81°51′46″W	Middleburg	Part of the Middleburg MPS
15	Middleburg Historic District	Middleburg Historic District	March 9, 1990 (#90000313)	3881-3895 Main Street and 2145 Wharf Street; 30°04′09″N 81°51′36″W	Middleburg	Part of the Middleburg MPS
16	Orange Park Elementary School	Orange Park Elementary School	July 15, 1998 (#98000858)	1401 Plainfield Avenue; 30°10′20″N 81°42′19″W	Orange Park	Part of the Orange Park, Florida MPS
17	Orange Park Negro Elementary School	Orange Park Negro Elementary School	July 15, 1998 (#98000856)	440 McIntosh Avenue; 30°10′01″N 81°42′15″W	Orange Park	Part of the Orange Park, Florida MPS
18	Princess Mound (8CL85)		March 2, 1990 (#90000311)	Address Restricted	Green Cove Springs	
19	River Road Historic District	River Road Historic District	July 15, 1998 (#98000861)	Junction of River Road and Stiles Avenue; 30°10′20″N 81°41′53″W	Orange Park	Part of the Orange Park, Florida MPS
20	St. Margaret's Episcopal Church and Cemetery	St. Margaret's Episcopal Church and Cemetery	June 4, 1973 (#73000570)	6874 Old Church Road; 30°04′02″N 81°41′48″W	Hibernia	
21	St. Mary's Church	St. Mary's Church	February 17, 1978 (#78000933)	St. Johns Avenue; 29°59′50″N 81°40′41″W	Green Cove Springs	
22	William Westcott House	William Westcott House	July 15, 1998 (#98000859)	443 Stiles Avenue; 30°09′58″N 81°43′00″W	Orange Park	Part of the Orange Park, Florida MPS
23	Winterbourne	Winterbourne	February 23, 1996 (#96000161)	2104 Winterbourne West; 30°09′51″N 81°41′48″W	Orange Park	

== See also ==
- List of National Historic Landmarks in Florida
- Middleburg MPS
- National Register of Historic Places listings in Florida
