= Orange Park =

Orange Park may refer to:

- Orange Park, Florida, a town in Clay County, Florida
- Orange Park Elementary School
- Orange Park High School
- Orange Park Negro Elementary School
- Orange Park Christian Academy
- Orange Park Mall
- Orange Park (New Jersey), a county park in Orange, New Jersey

== See also ==
- Orange Park Acres, California
