= Orange Park, Florida MPS =

- U.S. National Register of Historic Places
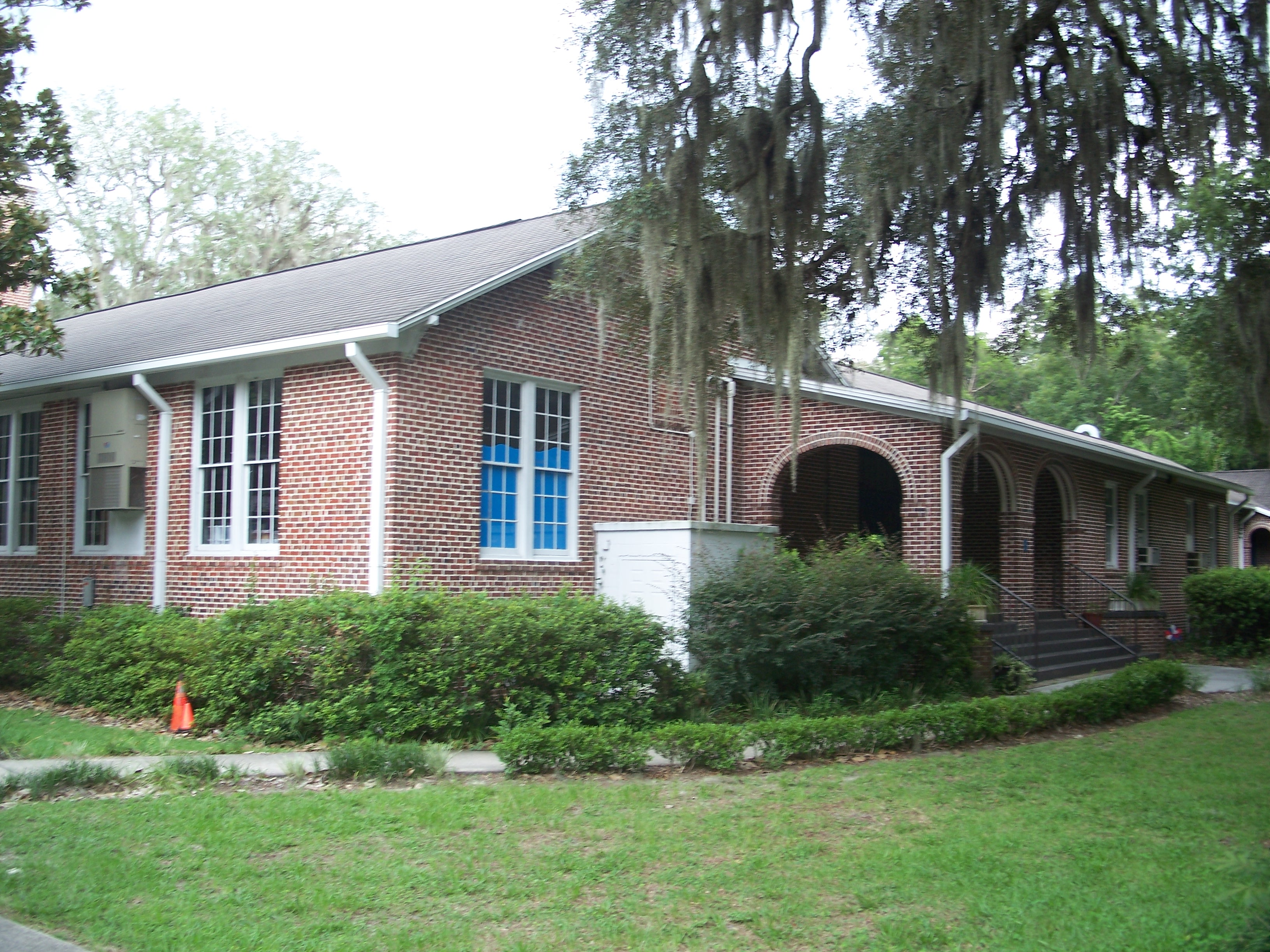
- Orange Park Elementary School

- Location within Florida Location within the United States
- Location: Orange Park, Florida
- Coordinates: 30°10′6.85″N 81°42′30.52″W
- MPS: Historic Architectural Resources of Orange Park, Florida
- NRHP reference No.: 64500120

The following buildings were added to the National Register of Historic Places as part of the Orange Park, Florida Multiple Property Submission (or MPS).

Resource Name	Also known as	Address	City	County	Added
William Clarke Estate		1039-1057 Kingsley Avenue	Orange Park	Clay County	July 15, 1998
Joseph Green House		531 McIntosh Avenue	Orange Park	Clay County	July 15, 1998
William Helffrich House		1200 Plainfield Avenue	Orange Park	Clay County	July 15, 1998
Orange Park Elementary School		1401 Plainfield Avenue	Orange Park	Clay County	July 15, 1998
Orange Park Negro Elementary School		440 McIntosh Avenue	Orange Park	Clay County	July 15, 1998
River Road Historic District		Junction of River Road and Stiles Avenue	Orange Park	Clay County	July 15, 1998
William Westcott House		443 Stiles Avenue	Orange Park	Clay County	July 15, 1998
