= Chris Gannon =

American football player (born 1966)

No. 84, 91
- Positions: Defensive end, tight end

Personal information
- Born: January 20, 1966 (age 60); Brandon, Florida, U.S.
- Listed height: 6 ft 6 in (1.98 m)
- Listed weight: 265 lb (120 kg)

Career information
- High school: Orange Park (Orange Park, Florida)
- College: Southwestern Louisiana
- NFL draft: 1989: 3rd round, 73rd overall pick

Career history
- New England Patriots (1989)*; San Diego Chargers (1989); New England Patriots (1990–1993)
- * Offseason or practice squad member only

Career NFL statistics
- Fumble recoveries: 2
- Sacks: 0.5
- Stats at Pro Football Reference

Christopher Stephen Gannon (born January 20, 1966) is an American former professional football player who was a defensive end in the National Football League (NFL). He played college football at the University of Louisiana at Lafayette and in the NFL for the New England Patriots and the San Diego Chargers.

== Early life ==
Christopher Stephen Gannon was born in Brandon, Florida to Juanita L. and Donald F. Gannon Sr. The Gannon family moved from Brandon, Florida to Orange Park, Florida when Chris was at a young age. He played Pee Wee football in the Pop Warner program. Later, he attended Orange Park High School where he played football as a tight end and defensive end. He was named to both the All-County and All-District teams during his freshman and junior years. As a senior at Orange Park High, he was second-team Class AAAA and made the All-State team.

== Collegiate athletic career ==
=== College football ===
Gannon attended the University of Louisiana at Lafayette (formerly University of Southwestern Louisiana). He played four years with the Ragin' Cajuns on the defense team.

==== 1984–1985 season ====
Gannon was signed by coach Sam Robertson and practiced and played under Robertson's leadership as a redshirt.

Between the '84 and '85 seasons, Gannon worked on building strength. He came into the 1985 season twenty pounds heavier. He played nose guard that year and chalked up 24 tackles, 22 assisted tackles, two deflections, and three sacks. He was third among his fellow lineman in tackles and made six tackles behind the line for a total of 45 yards lost by opponents. The Ragin' Cajuns ended the season with four wins and seven losses.

==== 1986 season ====
Robertson was replaced by Nelson Stokely during the 1986 preseason. Gannon played his remaining three years with Stokely.

As a sophomore, Gannon played in eleven games. He led the team with 18 tackles and 21 assisted tackles. He also sacked quarterbacks three times. He made four tackles behind the line that led to a total loss of 31 yards for opponents. He also played the strongside defensive end position. In that role, he forced a fumble and had seven tackles. During the Mississippi game, Gannon blocked a punt that led to a touchdown.

While playing on special teams, he returned the ball on a punt for 19 yards.

Gannon experienced recurring knee injuries that hampered his play. He was also plagued by a sore neck and pinched nerve in the shoulder from prior injuries.

==== 1987 season ====
Gannon recovered from his injuries and came into the 1987 season ready to play. Gannon played in nine games in the weak side defensive end position during his junior year. He led the Ragin' Cajun defensive linemen with 39 solo tackles, 31 assisted tackles and six sacks. Thirteen of his tackles caused a total loss of 67 yards for opponents. At the time, he was only one of eight Cajuns in history to stop opponent drives and cause double-digit losses in a single season. He caused two opponent fumbles, recovered two other fumbles, and deflected three passes. He intercepted the ball and returned it for nine yards. During the game against Northwestern Louisiana, Gannon had thirteen tackles and two sacks. Southwestern Louisiana won the game thirteen to three.

==== 1988 season ====
Gannon played in eleven games during his senior year. He sacked opposing quarterbacks six times and intercepted the ball in the Memphis State game. He was second on the team with 52 tackles and 42 assists.

Gannon ended his senior year of football as one of the top defensive lineman in the county. He was known for his speed, agility, and strength. Gannon ran the 40 yard dash in 4.8 seconds. He could bench press 385 lbs, power clean 315 lbs, and squat 460 lbs.

He finished his college career with 133 tackles, 116 assisted tackles and 18 quarterback sacks. His tackles resulted in a loss of 192 yards for Cajun opponents. His 18 career sacs of opponent quarterbacks caused a further 141 yards lost.

Gannon earned three letters in football and was inducted into the University of Louisiana at Lafayette Athletics Hall of Fame in 1998.

• First Team All-South Independent

=== Other collegiate activities ===
Gannon lettered twice in track throwing the discus. Gannon also lettered in baseball. Gannon worked as a swimming instructor during the summers of 1986, 1987, and 1988 in Lake Wales and St. Augustine, Florida where he taught the visually and hearing impaired to swim.

== Professional career ==
=== First stint with the New England Patriots ===
Chris Gannon was selected by the New England Patriots as the seventeenth pick in the third round of the 1989 NFL draft. He was the 73rd pick overall.

Due to his stand-out college years, Chris Gannon was considered to be one of the country's top defensive linemen available in the 1989 NFL draft. Gannon's speed, agility, strength, and field reaction were all qualities the Patriot's needed to shore up their defense.

Gannon wore 98 in his rookie time with the Patriots.

Gannon was waived by the Patriots in 1989, failing to make the final roster cut to forty-seven players.

=== San Diego Chargers ===
Gannon was claimed off of waivers on 4 September 1989 by the San Diego Chargers. He wore jersey number 84 and played defensive end. When he joined, the Chargers were in last place in their division ending up with a six and ten season in '89.

Gannon played in all of the games during the first ten weeks of the 1989 season, starting in only one,. During those weeks, the Chargers lost six games and won four.

Gannon played on special teams as the Charger's deep snapper.

The Chargers placed Gannon on Injured Reserve on 17 November 1989 due to a knee injury. He had to have surgery and spent the last six weeks on the Injured Reserves.

Gannon became a Plan B free agent in 1989. The Chargers left him unprotected, thinking other teams would shy away from him due to his knee injury.

=== Second stint with the New England Patriots ===
==== 1990 season ====
Gannon was claimed off waivers by the Patriots for the 1990 season on 31 March 1990. He signed a two-year contract for the 1990 and 1991 seasons.

Gannon started off the Patriots 1990 season recovering from a knee injury and surgery incurred while playing for the Chargers in 1989. The Patriots placed Gannon on the Reserve/Physically Unable to Perform list due to the knee injury where he stayed the during first eight weeks of the season.

He was back on the field for the Phoenix game on 25 November 1990. He played in six games that season, between week 10 and 17. He started at defensive end in the New York Jets game on 23 December and in the New York Giants game of 30 December 1990. He is credited with one rushing attempt with no yards gained. The Patriots lost all six games.

Gannon, recovered from the knee surgery, chalked up seven tackles with three assists in the six games he played for the Patriots during the remainder of the 1990 season.

==== 1991 season ====
He was placed on the Injured Reserve list on 27 August 1991 due to a preseason knee injury. He was later activated to the practice squad on 22 October 1991 then finally placed on the active roster on 1 November 1991.

Gannon moved over to special teams when he returned to the roster. One of his roles on special teams was long snapper. He would take the center position and snap the ball to the kicker for field goals and punts when the situation called for a long snap.

He played eight games, weeks ten through seventeen, in the 1991 season. He recovered a Buffalo Bills fumbled punt during his first game back as a roster member on 3 November 1991. He also racked up three special teams tackles during the season. The Patriots went 3 and 5 during those games.

==== 1992 Season ====
Gannon played in twelve games during the 1992 season, missing the first three weeks of the season and later the New York Jets games in week five and twelve. He was charged with a fumble in the week nine game on 1 November 1992 against the Buffalo Bills.

Missed the Seahawks game on 18 September 1992 due to knee and ankle injury.

Gannon had thirteen tackles and four assisted tackles as a defensive end that season. He made four tackles in three games against New Orleans, Indianapolis, and Miami. It was a career high performance. The Patriots viewed him as a valuable member of the special teams squad because of is ability to make the long snap.

==== 1993 season ====
Gannon did not start, but played in the first four games of the 1993 season. The Patriots lost those four games going on to a one and nine season.

He was waived by the Patriots in 1993 along with several other defensive linemen.

Gannon fumbled the ball twice while playing with the Patriots (1990, 1992). He recovered a fumble in the 1992 season with the New England Patriots. He was credited with an assisted quarterback sack during his career.

Chris played for Bill Parcells during his final year with New England. Parcells was running pre-season summer practice as if it were a game, running different scenarios, intent on finding problem areas and preventing mistakes leading to penalties. On one play, Gannon anticipated the snap and jumped offside. Parcells took this as a teaching opportunity. "That's the worst penalty you can have on defense! It's all because you're not watching the ball, Gannon". Chris was embarrassed by the gaff and looked as if he wanted to "dig a hole at the 50-yard line and crawl into the ground".

== Post NFL years ==
=== College coaching ===
After his career in the NFL, Chris returned to the Louisiana Ragin' Cajuns football program to work as a strength coach (1997-2000) and an assistant coach (1995-1996) under his former coach, Nelson Stokely. He coached at the university for six years.

=== Personal and later life ===
Chris Gannon married Ruth Ann Schoeffler in 1991.

During the NFL off-seasons, Gannon was involved in Boys and Girls Club and other charities. He was also active in the Say No To Drugs campaign.

Chris Gannon, along with his wife Ruth Ann returned to Lafayette, Louisiana after his NFL career was over.

Chris began a pharmaceutical sales career in 2001 with Forest Pharmaceuticals (now Allergan). This career has taken him to Texas and back again to Louisiana during which he won numerous sales, field management, and leadership awards and recognition.

Chris coached his son Brandon from Pop Warner youth football, Middle School, and Junior High School until Brandon attended St. Thomas More High School and joined the Cougar football program. With Brandon's contribution, the Cougars reached the Division II semifinals. After high school, Brandon followed his father's path to University of Louisiana, appearing as a preferred walk-on in 2018. He made the Ragin' Cajuns roster as a redshirt freshman in the spring 2019. Like his father, he is part of the defensive line.

Gannon coached the fifth and sixth grade football team at Our Lady of Fatima Catholic School for several years

Gannon served as president of the University of Louisiana Gridiron Club.

His daughter Hailey Gannon has played soccer for St. Thomas More as a midfielder and made All-District second-team for Division II, District three in 2019.

Ruth Ann (Schoeffler) Gannon also attended University of Louisiana and lettered in track. She ran cross county and was a member of the track and field teams in 1986, 1987, and 1988.

Chris's father, Donald Francis Gannon Sr. died in 1994 at age 63. His mother, Juanita L. Gannon died on April 25, 2007, at age 70.

Donnie F. Gannon Jr, Chris's older brother, died on June 5, 2010, at age 52.
