= Sheats =

Sheats is a surname. Notable people with the surname include:

- Charles Christopher Sheats (1839–1904), American lawyer and politician
- David Sheats, American hip-hop producer and DJ
- Robert Sheats (1915–1995), United States Navy master diver
- William N. Sheats (1851–1922), educator and politician
