= OPCA =

OPCA may refer to:

- Office of Public and Congressional Affairs, a part of the US Federal Bureau of Investigation
- Olivopontocerebellar atrophy, a brain disorder
- Orange Park Christian Academy, Orange Park, Florida, U.S.
- Organised pseudolegal commercial arguments, a type of pseudolaw
- Outer membrane protein OpcA
