= William Westcott House =

Historic house in Florida, United States

- U.S. National Register of Historic Places
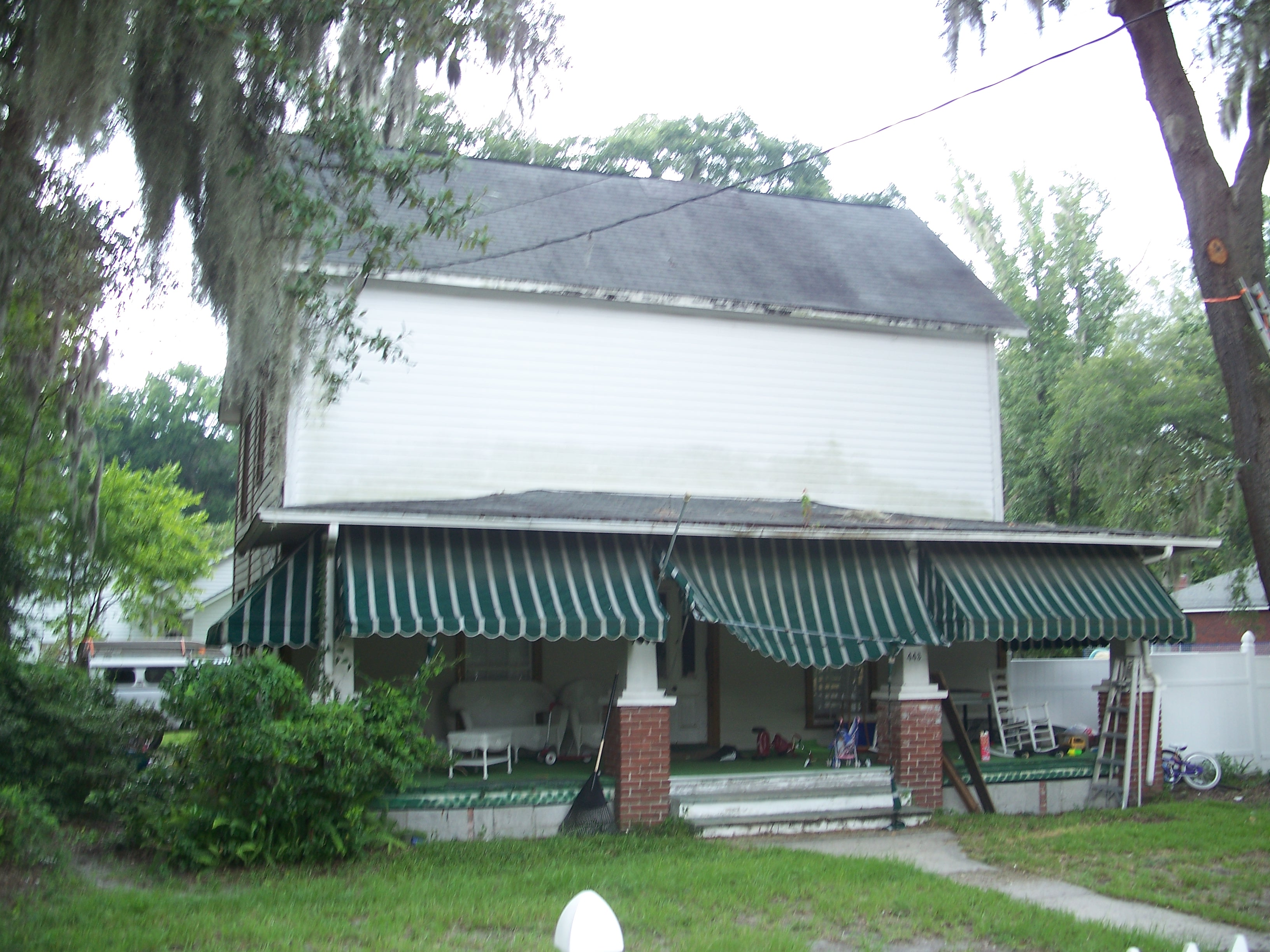

- Location within Florida Location within the United States
- Location: Orange Park, Florida
- Coordinates: 30°9′58″N 81°43′0″W
- MPS: Orange Park, Florida MPS
- NRHP reference No.: 98000859
- Added to NRHP: July 15, 1998

The William Westcott House (also known as the R. R. Byers House) is a historic home in Orange Park, Florida. It is located at 443 Stiles Avenue. On July 15, 1998, it was added to the U.S. National Register of Historic Places.
