= Orange Park Normal & Industrial School =

School in Orange Park, Florida, US (1891–1913)

Orange Park Normal and Industrial School

Location
- 2042 Park Avenue, Orange Park, Florida, U.S. 30.164966°N 81.701485°W

Information
- Founded: October 7, 1891
- Closed: 1913
- Affiliation: American Missionary Association

Orange Park Normal and Industrial School was a private boarding school founded in 1891 in Orange Park, Florida. It was Florida's only racially integrated school when it was in operation, founded by the American Missionary Association (AMA). It closed in 1913 in the wake of a 1895 state law forbidding whites from teaching blacks.

== History ==
The school was founded by the American Missionary Association (AMA) and opened in October 7, 1891 south of Jacksonville in Clay County along the St. Johns River. The campus included dormitories and workshops. Former principals included Amos W. Farnham, and B.D. Rowlee.

William N. Sheats, the Florida state superintendent of public education who was a staunch segregationist, passed a law in 1895 ("Sheats' Law") that prohibited any Florida school (public or private), from teaching black and white students together. The school appealed and won against "Sheats' Law", but closed in 1913 after Sheats had returned to office.

The former school site is home to Orange Park's town hall and police station. A historical marker is at the site of the school, erected in 2017.
