= Terrance Plummer =

American football player (born 1993)

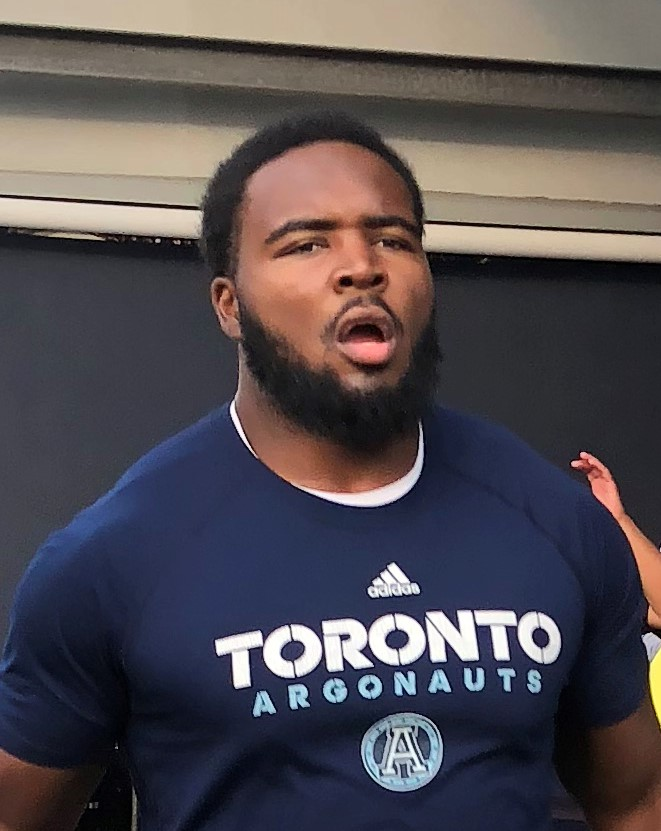
- Plummer with the Toronto Argonauts in 2018

Profile
- Position: Linebacker

Personal information
- Born: June 20, 1993 (age 33); West Palm Beach, Florida, U.S.
- Listed height: 6 ft 1 in (1.85 m)
- Listed weight: 230 lb (104 kg)

Career information
- High school: Orange Park (Orange Park, Florida)
- College: UCF
- NFL draft: 2015: undrafted

Career history
- Washington Redskins (2015); Minnesota Vikings (2015)*; Toronto Argonauts (2016–2018); Orlando Apollos (2019)*; Hamilton Tiger-Cats (2019)*; Tampa Bay Vipers (2020); Orlando Guardians (2023)
- * Offseason or practice squad member only

Awards and highlights
- Grey Cup champion (2017); 2× First-team All-AAC (2013, 2014)

Career NFL statistics
- Total tackles: 1
- Stats at Pro Football Reference
- Stats at CFL.ca

Terrance Plummer (born June 20, 1993) is an American former professional football player who was a linebacker in the National Football League (NFL) and Canadian Football League (CFL). He played college football for the UCF Knights. He signed as an undrafted free agent with the Washington Redskins in 2015.

== Early life ==
Plummer attended Orange Park High School in Orange Park, Florida, where he played football for coach Danny Green at all three linebacker positions including at the inside position as a senior. He received All-First Coast, all-conference and all-county recognition throughout his high school career. As a senior, he amassed over 110 tackles, five sack, two pass deflections and one forced fumble (two recoveries), helping lead the Raiders to a Class 6A Region I District 1 title and berth in the state regional final round. He was a 2010 nominee for the Florida Class 6A Mr. Football Award and was a member of the 2010 Florida Times Union All-First Coast Team, as well as an honorable mention FHSAA all-state in 2009. During his high school career, he led his team in tackling for three-straight seasons and also had eight touchdowns rushing. Plummer also lettered three years in basketball at Orange Park. He had a bench press of 350 pounds.

Viewed as a versatile linebacker prospect, Plummer was given a three-star rating from Rivals, ESPN and Scout. He was listed as the No. 70 outside linebacker nationally by ESPN.com and No. 84 from Scout.com. He picked the Knights over Arkansas, NC State, Vanderbilt and Cincinnati, among others.

== Professional career ==
Pre-draft measurables
Height	Weight	Arm length	Hand span	40-yard dash	10-yard split	20-yard split	20-yard shuttle	Three-cone drill	Vertical jump	Broad jump	Bench press
6 ft 1 in (1.85 m)	231 lb (105 kg)	34in	10 1/4 in (0.26 m)	4.71 s	1.64 s	2.79 s	4.32 s	7.16 s	33 1/2 in (0.85 m)	9 ft 3 in (2.82 m)	22 reps
All values from Pro Day

After going undrafted in the 2015 NFL draft, Plummer was signed by the Washington Redskins on May 2, 2015. He put together a solid preseason as a middle linebacker and special teams contributor for the Redskins, finishing third on the team with 12 total tackles. On September 5, 2015, he was waived during final roster cuts before the start of the regular season, but signed to the team's practice squad the next day. Plummer was promoted to the active roster on September 19, 2015. Plummer played in three games, recording 1 special teams tackle, but was released October 5, 2015.

On October 27, 2015, the Minnesota Vikings signed Plummer to the practice squad. On December 1, 2015, he was released from practice squad. On December 8, 2015, Plummer was re-signed to the Vikings practice squad. On January 11, 2016, Plummer signed a reserve/future contract to the Minnesota Vikings. He was released on April 13, 2016. Then added again by the Minnesota Vikings on August 1, 2016. On August 30, 2016, Plummer was cut by the Vikings.

On October 17, 2016, Plummer signed a practice roster agreement with the Toronto Argonauts of the Canadian Football League. On November 30, 2016, Plummer re-signed with the Argonauts, and made the roster in 2017 as a reserve linebacker. During the playoffs, Plummer recorded an interception, which he returned for a touchdown to help Toronto win the CFL East finals and advance to the 105th Grey Cup, in which the Argos defeated the Calgary Stampeders. He became a free agent on February 25, 2019, two weeks after he had received a contract extension from Toronto.

Plummer was signed to a contract from the rights list of the Orlando Apollos of the Alliance of American Football (AAF) on April 1, 2019, the day before the league suspended operations.

Plummer was signed by the Hamilton Tiger-Cats of the CFL on April 4, 2019, after the AAF suspended football operations. Plummer was than released one month later, prior to the start of training camp.

In October 2019, Plummer was selected by the Tampa Bay Vipers in the open phase of the 2020 XFL draft. He had his contract terminated when the league suspended operations on April 10, 2020.

On November 17, 2022, Plummer was drafted by the Orlando Guardians of the XFL. The Guardians folded when the XFL and USFL merged to create the United Football League (UFL).
