= Joseph Green House =

Historic house in Florida, United States

- U.S. National Register of Historic Places
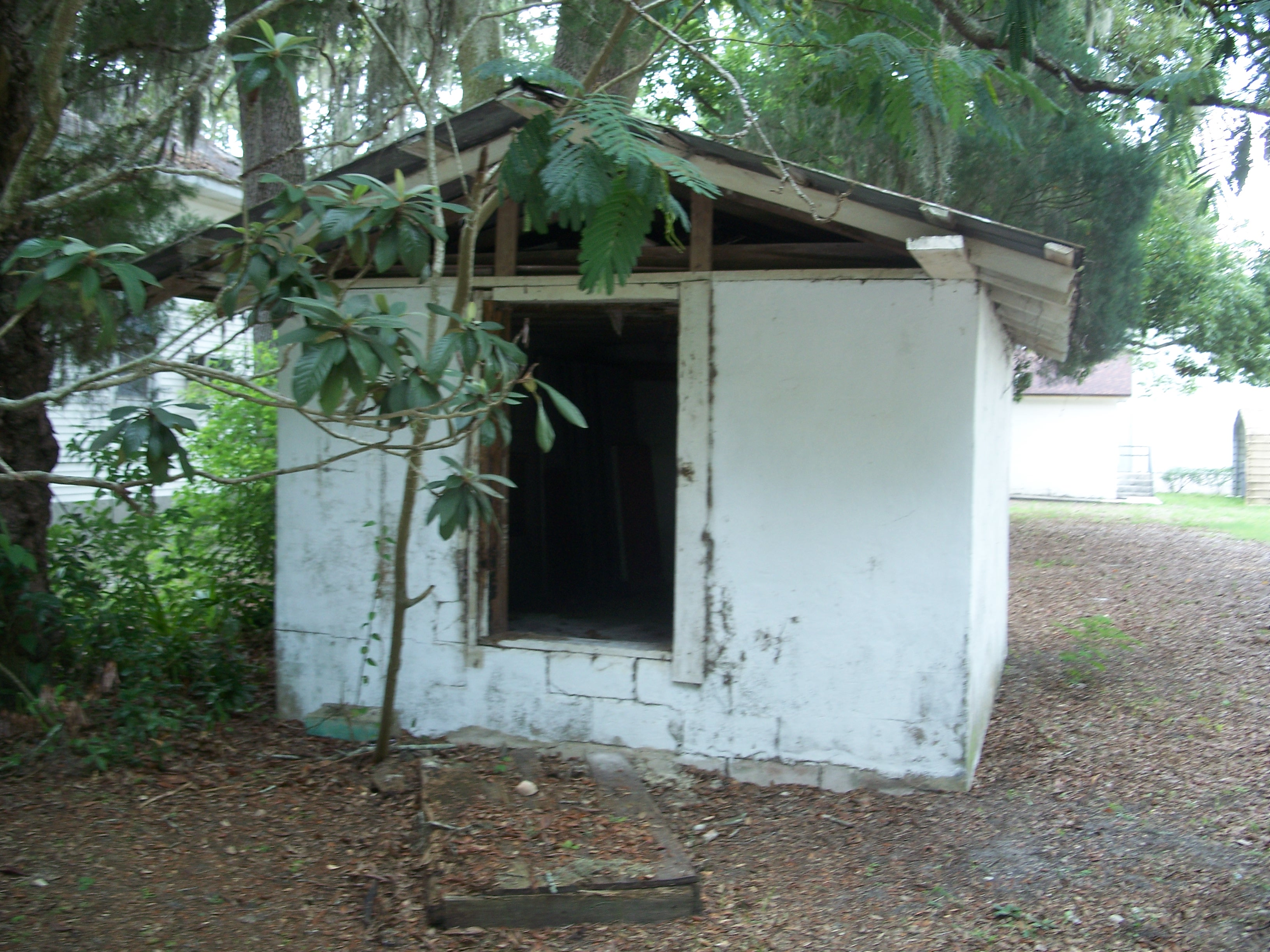
- Site of former house, which was demolished in 1999

- Location within Florida Location within the United States
- Location: Orange Park, Clay County, Florida
- Coordinates: 30°10′2″N 81°42′22″W
- Area: 1,250 sq. ft.
- Built: 1893
- Demolished: 1999
- MPS: Orange Park, Florida MPS
- NRHP reference No.: 98000860
- Added to NRHP: July 15, 1998

The Joseph Green House was a historic two-story home in Orange Park, Florida. It was the oldest building of Orange Park's black community, located at 531 McIntosh Avenue. On July 15, 1998, it was added to the U.S. National Register of Historic Places, becoming the Register's only minority-owned property in Clay County at the time. The following year, it was demolished.

Green was a black carpenter from Mississippi who settled in Orange Park around 1886 and built this home in 1893. He built in total 15 homes in the area, of which this was the last to remain. His daughter-in-law sold the home to St. James AME Church for $30,000 in 1994. The church then used it as a rental property, so it was not open for public tours.

AME Churches in Florida, the parent church of the local congregation, sued a number of local congregants to gain ownership of the property. The parent church's bishop said the local church had promised to build a new sanctuary on that spot, so he agreed to drop the lawsuit on the condition that the home be demolished.
