= William Helffrich House =

Historic house in Florida, United States

- U.S. National Register of Historic Places
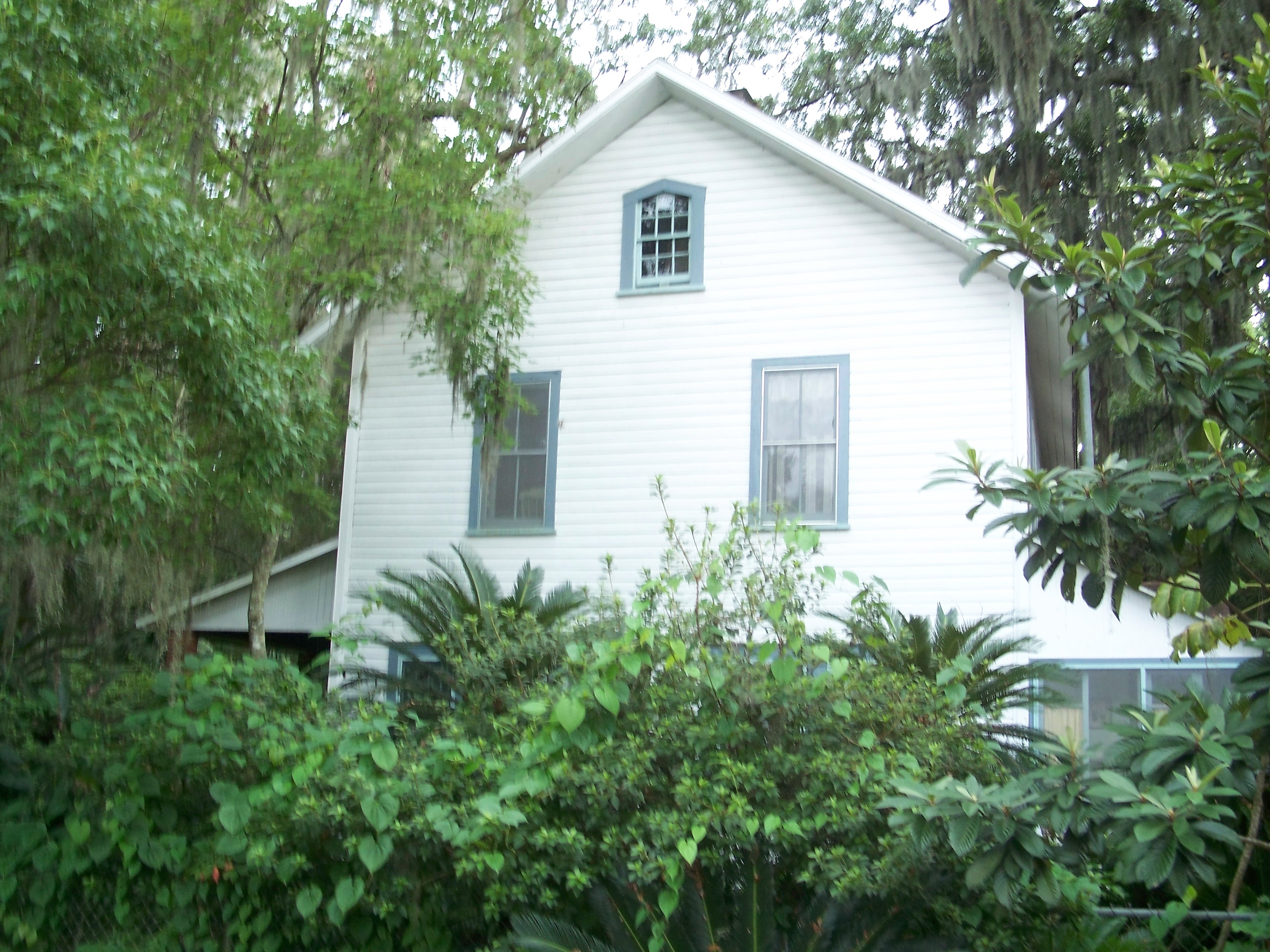

- Location within Florida Location within the United States
- Location: Orange Park, Florida
- Coordinates: 30°10′32″N 81°42′21″W
- Built: 1878
- MPS: Orange Park, Florida MPS
- NRHP reference No.: 98000857
- Added to NRHP: July 15, 1998

The William Helffrich House is a historic house located at 1200 Plainfield Avenue in Orange Park, Florida. It is locally significant as a frame vernacular house with Gothic Revival influences, and for being one of Orange Park's largest 19th-century houses.

== Description and history ==
Built in 1878

It was added to the National Register of Historic Places on July 15, 1998.
