= Penney Farms, Florida =

Town in the state of Florida, United States

- Town
- Town of Penney Farms
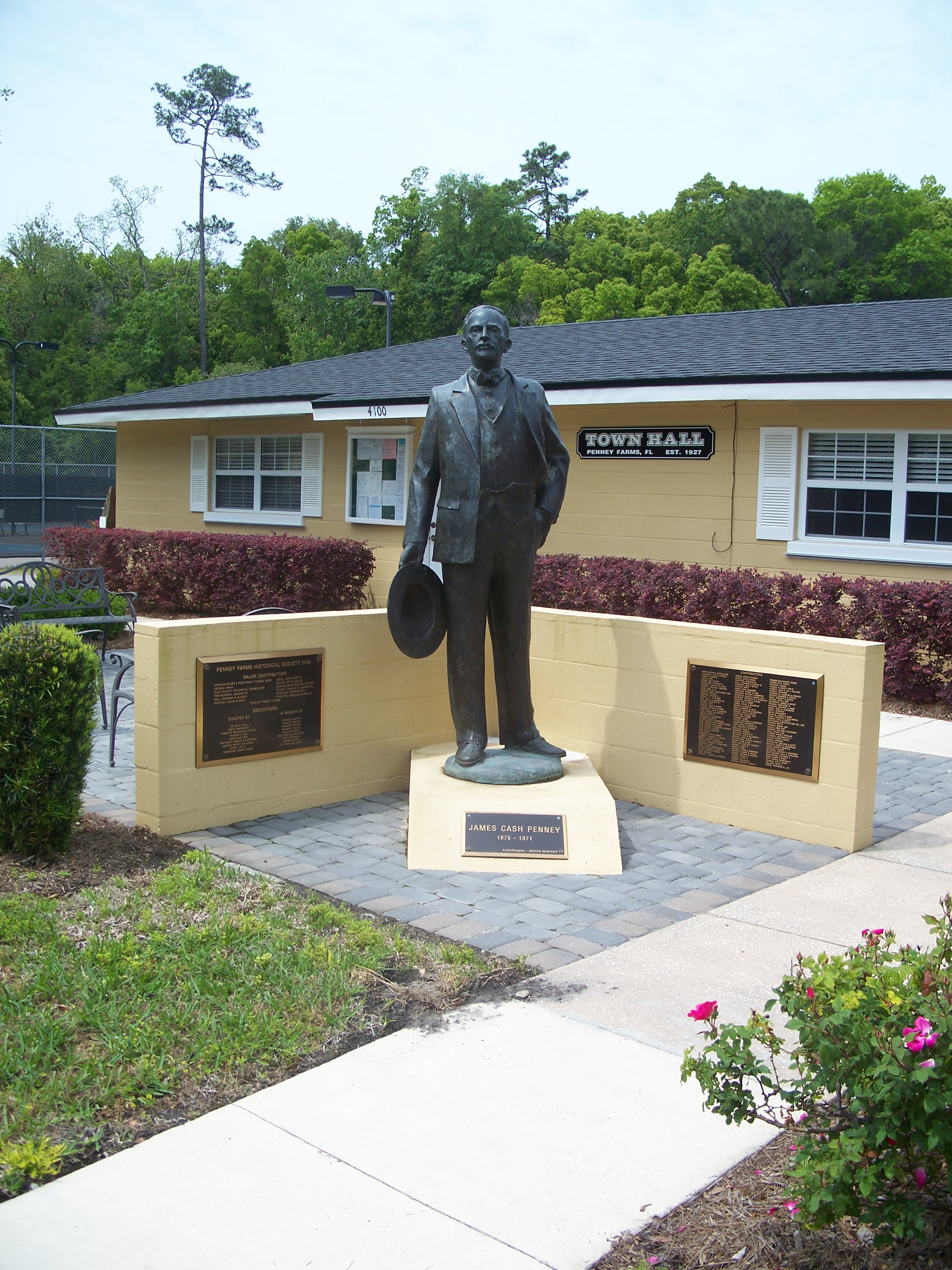
- Penney Farms Town Hall with a statue of James Cash Penney
- Motto: "Unity in Community"
- Location in Clay County and the state of Florida
- Coordinates: 29°58′51″N 81°48′39″W
- Country: United States
- State: Florida
- County: Clay
- Founded (Long Branch City): 1922
- Incorporated (Town of Penney Farms): 1927

Government
  - Type: Council-Manager
  - Mayor: Annette Brooks
  - Vice Mayor: Thomas E. DeVille
  - Councilmembers: Richard Hollowell, Stephan Nix, and; Adrian M. Andrews
  - Town Manager: David J. Cooper
  - Town Clerk: Anita E. Cooper

Area
  - Total: 1.46 sq mi (3.78 km^{2})
  - Land: 1.46 sq mi (3.78 km^{2})
  - Water: 0 sq mi (0.00 km^{2})
- Elevation: 92 ft (28 m)

Population (2020)
  - Total: 821
  - Density: 562.6/sq mi (217.24/km^{2})
- Time zone: UTC-5 (Eastern (EST))
  - Summer (DST): UTC-4 (EDT)
- ZIP code: 32079
- Area code(s): 904, 324
- FIPS code: 12-55875
- GNIS feature ID: 2407097
- Website: penneyfarmsfl.org

Penney Farms is a town in central Clay County, Florida, United States. It is part of the Jacksonville, Florida metropolitan statistical area. Its population was 821 at the 2020 census, up from 749 at the 2010 census.

== History ==
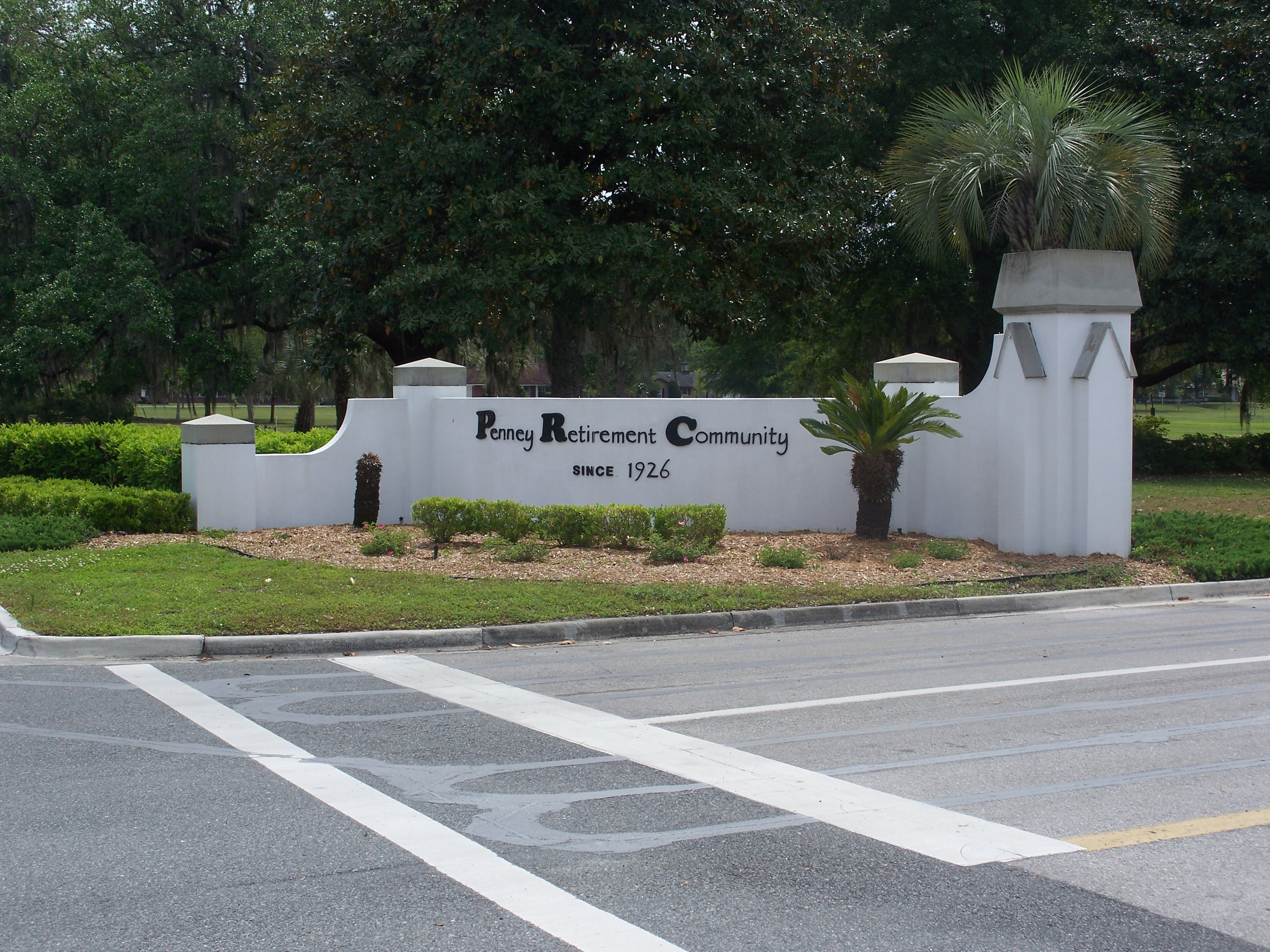
The Penney Retirement Community has been there since 1926.

In 1922, JCPenney department store pioneer J. C. Penney founded the community of Penney Farms (briefly known as Long Branch City), where he platted an experimental, suburban farming village. The state of Florida officially incorporated the Town of Penney Farms in 1927.

The real estate decline and stock market crash caused Penney to scale back his ambitions to a community for retired Christian ministers, in honor of his father, who was a Baptist preacher. Today, the Penney Retirement Community is a 192-acre (0.78 km^{2}) home to Christian laypeople, as well as clergy and missionaries.

== Geography ==
The Town of Penney Farms is located near the geographic center of Clay County. Florida State Road 16 leads east 8 miles (13 km) to Green Cove Springs, the county seat, and west 20 miles (32 km) to Starke.

According to the United States Census Bureau, the town has a total area of 1.4 square miles (3.6 km^{2}), all land.

=== Climate ===
The climate in this area is characterized by hot, humid summers and generally mild winters. According to the Köppen climate classification, the Town of Penney Farms has a humid subtropical climate zone (Cfa).

== Demographics ==
Historical population
Census	Pop.	Note	%±
1930	825		—
1940	370		−55.2%
1950	445		20.3%
1960	545		22.5%
1970	561		2.9%
1980	630		12.3%
1990	609		−3.3%
2000	580		−4.8%
2010	749		29.1%
2020	821		9.6%
U.S. Decennial Census

=== 2010 and 2020 censuses ===
Penney Farms racial composition (Hispanics excluded from racial categories) (NH = Non-Hispanic)
Race	Pop 2010	Pop 2020	% 2010	% 2020
White (NH)	675	742	90.12%	90.38%
Black or African American (NH)	49	43	6.54%	5.24%
Native American or Alaska Native (NH)	0	0	0.00%	0.00%
Asian (NH)	7	3	0.93%	0.37%
Pacific Islander or Native Hawaiian (NH)	0	0	0.00%	0.00%
Some other race (NH)	0	2	0.00%	0.24%
Multiracial (NH)	10	17	1.34%	2.07%
Hispanic or Latino (any race)	8	14	1.07%	1.71%
Total	749	821		

As of the 2020 United States census, 821 people, 286 households, and 163 families were residing in the town.

As of the 2010 United States census, 749 people, 232 households, and 148 families lived in the town.

=== 2000 census ===
As of the census of 2000, 580 people, 266 households, and 171 families resided in the town. The population density was 414.7 inhabitants per square mile (160.1/km^{2}). The 290 housing units had an average density of 207.4 per square mile (80.1/km^{2}). The racial makeup of the town was 90.86% White, 8.28% African American, 0.17% Asian, and 0.69% from two or more races. Hispanics or Latinos of any race were 0.34% of the population.

Of the 266 households, 6.0% had children under 18 living with them, 57.5% were married couples living together, 5.3% had a female householder with no husband present, and 35.7% were not families. About 33.5% of all households were made up of individuals, and 28.2% had someone living alone who was 65 or older. The average household size was 1.83 and the average family size was 2.23.

In 2000, in the town, the age distribution was 5.7% under 18, 1.9% from 18 to 24, 6.4% from 25 to 44, 10.2% from 45 to 64, and 75.9% who were 65 or older. The median age was 76 years. For every 100 females, there were 64.8 males. For every 100 females 18 and over, there were 61.4 males.

In 2000, the median income for a household in the town was $37,344 and for a family was $46,875. Males had a median income of $31,875 versus $31,250 for females. The per capita income for the town was $23,929. About 8.1% of families and 16.4% of the population were below the poverty line, including 41.7% of those under age 18 and 11.5% of those age 65 or over.

== Notable people ==
- Meinhardt Raabe, actor
- E. Urner Goodman, influential leader of the Boy Scouts of America and creator of the Order of the Arrow
