= Bubba Midden =

- Bubba Midden (8CL84)
- U.S. National Register of Historic Places
- Location within Florida Location within the United States
- Location: Clay County, Florida
- Nearest city: Green Cove Springs
- Coordinates: 29.99°N 81.68°W
- NRHP reference No.: 90000159
- Added to NRHP: 2 March 1990

The Bubba Midden is a historic site near Green Cove Springs, Florida. It is located on Fleming Island, northwest of Green Cove Springs. On March 2, 1990, it was added to the U.S. National Register of Historic Places.
