= Orange Park High School =

High school in Orange Park, Florida, United States

Coordinates: 30.1635423°N 81.7461227°W

Location
- 2300 Kingsley Ave; Orange Park, Florida; United States

Information
- Type: High School
- Motto: Swords up!
- Established: 1959
- School district: Clay County School District
- Principal: Ivin Gunder
- Staff: 94.60 (FTE)
- Enrollment: 1,810 (2023-24)
- Student to teacher ratio: 19.13
- Colors: Orange and white
- Athletics: Cheerleading, Golf, Tennis, Basketball, Soccer, Track, Cross Country, Dance, Swimming, Wrestling, Football, Flag Football, Baseball, Volleyball, Slow And Fast-Pitch Softball, Marching Band, Winterguard and Weight Lifting
- Mascot: Raider Man
- Nickname: Raiders
- Website: https://oph.myoneclay.net/

Orange Park High School is a high school located in Orange Park, Florida. It is a part of the Clay County School District. The school opened as a junior-senior high school in Fall 1959, although it went only to 10th grade, so that the first graduating class was not until Spring 1962. The school celebrated its 50th anniversary in 2011, the 50th anniversary of the first 12th-grade class (1961-1962 school year).

The athletic teams are known as the Raiders. In the 2021–2022 school year the school had 1,560 students.

== School Data ==
- The year of 2007-2008 had approximately 2,538 students and OPHS statistics indicated that 87% were college bound.
- The school has 164 classrooms.
- Most notable catchphrase- "Swords Up" (2017-N/A)

== Athletic achievements ==
=== Football ===
- The 1992 football team was undefeated in the regular season, were ranked #1 in the state for most of the season, and were ranked as high as No. 15 in the United States by USA Today. The 1992 team were Florida Star Conference champs, District 1-5A champs, and went to the Region 1-5A finals (Final Four), where they lost to Bradenton Manatee.
- The 2008 football team, the first led by Head Coach Danny Green, were Region 1-6A Division Champions and went to the 3rd round of the playoffs.
- The 2009 football team were also Region 1-6A Division Champions, and went undefeated season the entire regular season.
- The 2010 football team were Region 1-6A Division Champions, becoming the first team in Clay County history to win their district three consecutive years.

=== Boys basketball ===
- The 1995 Boys Basketball Team was a Region 1-6A Finalist.
- The 2007 Boys Basketball Team went (27-3) and were champions of District 1-6A in both the regular season and in the district tournament, champions of the St. Johns River Athletic Conference, and made it to the finals of Region 1-6A.

=== Boys soccer ===
- The 2001 Boys Soccer Team won the state championship and was ranked #3 in the United States.

Varsity Cheerleading

- The 2003-2004 Varsity Competition Cheer team won the National Title at the Universal Cheer Association's (UCA) Nationals at Disneyworld

== Non-athletic achievements ==
NJROTC

- The NJROTC unit took 1st place at the Athletic, Academic & Drill National Championships for three consecutive years, 1991, 1992, and 1993. The 1994 unit came in 2nd place. The 1995 unit reclaimed the title again. Since then it has only managed a top ten finish once—a 6th-place finish in 2007, led by cadet commander Bill Owen.

Marching Band/Winter-guard

- The Winter-guard team took 1st place at the Florida state championship in 2017, 2021, and most recently 2023.

== Notable alumni ==
- Adrian White (1982) - American football defensive back and current assistant coach for the Buffalo Bills.
- Chris Gannon (1984) - American football defensive end for the New England Patriots and the San Diego Chargers.
- Brian Lee (1984) - Professional Wrestler (WWF, Smokey Mountain Wrestling, ECW, TNA, USWA).
- Todd Grisham - Current UFC analyst and former ESPN anchor and commentator for World Wrestling Entertainment.
- Sid Roberson (1989) - former Major League Baseball pitcher with the Milwaukee Brewers.
- Richard O. White, III, MD (1994) - Chair of the Division of Community Internal Medicine, Mayo Clinic - Jacksonville.
- Brian Patrick Wade (1996) - Actor and Producer, known for The Guardian (2006), Generation Kill (2008) and Agents of S.H.I.E.L.D. (2013).
- Greg Smith (1999), a child prodigy who graduated from the school at only age 9. He later went on to Randolph–Macon College at only 10 years old.
- Sahel Kazemi (2004–2005) - Involved in the murder-suicide incident that took the life of NFL star quarterback Steve McNair of the Tennessee Titans.
- Terrance Plummer (2010) - American football linebacker. All-American honorable mention by Sports Illustrated and an All-AAC first team pick While at the University of Central Florida, received the 2014 Fiesta Bowl Defensive MVP award after a win against #6 Baylor.
- Shawn Wells (2015) - US Army Veteran, Actor and Model
- Kat Cole (1996) - Businesswoman, Humanitarian, CEO of Athletic Greens, former President of Cinnabon and EVP of Hooters
