= Adrian White (American football) =

American football player and coach (born 1964)

No. 36, 38
- Position: Safety

Personal information
- Born: April 6, 1964 (age 62); Jacksonville, Florida, U.S.
- Listed height: 6 ft 0 in (1.83 m)
- Listed weight: 200 lb (91 kg)

Career information
- High school: Orange Park (FL)
- College: Southern Illinois; Florida
- NFL draft: 1987: 2nd round, 55th overall pick

Career history

Playing
- New York Giants (1987–1991); Green Bay Packers (1992); New England Patriots (1993)

Coaching
- Southern Illinois University (1999–2000) Defensive backs coach; Rhein Fire (2001–2002) Defensive backs coach; Indiana State University (2002) Defensive backs coach; Rhein Fire (2003) Defensive backs coach; Rhein Fire (2004–2006) Defensive coordinator/defensive backs coach; Berlin Thunder (2007) Defensive coordinator/defensive backs coach; Buffalo Bills (2008–2011) Defensive quality control coach; Buffalo Bills (2012) Assistant defensive backs coach; Jacksonville Sharks (2015) Defensive backs coach

Awards and highlights
- Super Bowl champion (XXV); Second-team All-American (1986); First-team All-SEC (1986)

Career NFL statistics
- Interceptions: 4
- Stats at Pro Football Reference

Adrian Darnell White (born April 6, 1964) is an American former professional football player who was a safety for seven seasons in the National Football League (NFL) during the 1980s and 1990s. White played college football for the Florida Gators, and thereafter, he played professionally for the New York Giants, Green Bay Packers and New England Patriots of the NFL. He became an assistant coach after his playing career ended.

== Early life ==
White was born in Jacksonville, Florida in 1964. He attended Orange Park High School where he played high school football for the Orange Park Raiders.

== College career ==
White began his college career at Southern Illinois University in Carbondale, Illinois, and he played football for the Southern Illinois Salukis for a single season in 1983. He transferred to the University of Florida in Gainesville, Florida where he was a walk-on for coach Charlie Pell's Florida Gators football team from 1984 to 1986. White was a three-year starter for the Gators, and a key member of the Gators' defense during the 1984 and 1985 seasons, when the Gators posted identical 9–1–1 overall win–loss records and led the Southeastern Conference (SEC) with best-in-the-SEC records of 5–0–1 and 5–1. He was a first-team All-SEC selection and a second-team All-American as a senior in 1986. White was also a two-year Florida Gators track and field letterman as a sprinter and anchored the Gators' 4x100-meter relay team that included Olympian Dennis Mitchell.

White graduated from the University of Florida with a bachelor's degree in criminal justice in 1993, and later earned a master's degree in education from Fairleigh Dickinson University in Teaneck, New Jersey.

== Professional career ==
The New York Giants selected White in the second round (fifty-fifth overall pick) in the 1987 NFL draft. He played for the Giants from 1987 to 1991. White finished his NFL playing career with single-season stints with the Green Bay Packers (1992) and the New England Patriots (1993). During his seven-season NFL career, White played in 70 regular season games, started five of them, and had four interceptions.

== Coaching career ==
White was the assistant coach for defensive quality control promoted to assistant defensive backs coach for the Buffalo Bills, and his responsibilities included opposition scouting and self-scouting, as well as working with the Bills' defensive backs corps. He was one of three assistants retained from the previous coaching staff by the Bills' new head coach, Chan Gailey, having previously been a Bills assistant for two years. He was with the Bills from 2008 to 2012, when he, along with the entire Bills coaching staff, was dismissed on December 31, 2012.

== See also ==
- Florida Gators football, 1980–89
- List of Florida Gators football All-Americans
- List of Florida Gators in the NFL draft
- List of University of Florida alumni
