= Orange Park Christian Academy =

Orange Park Christian Academy (OPCA)

Location
- 1324 Kingsley Avenue; Orange Park, Florida 32073; United States; 30°09′51″N 81°43′19″W

Information
- School type: Private, coeducational
- Denomination: Assemblies of God
- Established: 1981
- Status: Closed
- Closed: January 15, 2008
- CEEB code: 101264
- Teaching staff: 16 (as of 2005–06)
- Grades: K–12
- Enrollment: 216 (as of 2005–06)
- Student to teacher ratio: 13.6 (as of 2005–06)
- Colours: Gold and Maroon
- Mascot: Dan D. Lion

Orange Park Christian Academy (OPCA) was a private Christian school in Orange Park, Florida, United States. It served students in kindergarten through grade 12 from 1981 to January 2008.

== Future use of land ==
In early 2009, a collaboration of distinguished alumni attempted to split the land upon which the Orange Park Christian Academy formerly sat into two adjacent tracts. One tract was to be developed into a "full service entertainment complex." The other was to become a "novelty store." The entrepreneurs expected heavy traffic at both of these businesses from the residents at the geriatric center next door and the people of the surrounding community. The development plan, however, has ground to a halt because of zoning issues at the planning department in Green Cove Springs.

== History ==
Orange Park Christian Academy opened in 1981, associated with the Orange Park Assembly of God church.

In December 2007, the school's impending closure was announced. The school officially closed on January 15, 2008.

== Extracurricular activities ==
The Orange Park Christian Lions competed in Florida High School Athletic Association-sanctioned competition until the 2007–08 school year. They were classified in the FHSAA as Section 1, Division 8. In their last year as an FHSAA member school, they fielded teams in boys' and girls' basketball, boys' soccer, and girls' volleyball.

For many years, Orange Park Christian Academy shared a heated rivalry with First Coast Christian School of Jacksonville, Florida.
