= River Road Historic District =

Historic district in Florida, United States

- U.S. National Register of Historic Places
- U.S. Historic district
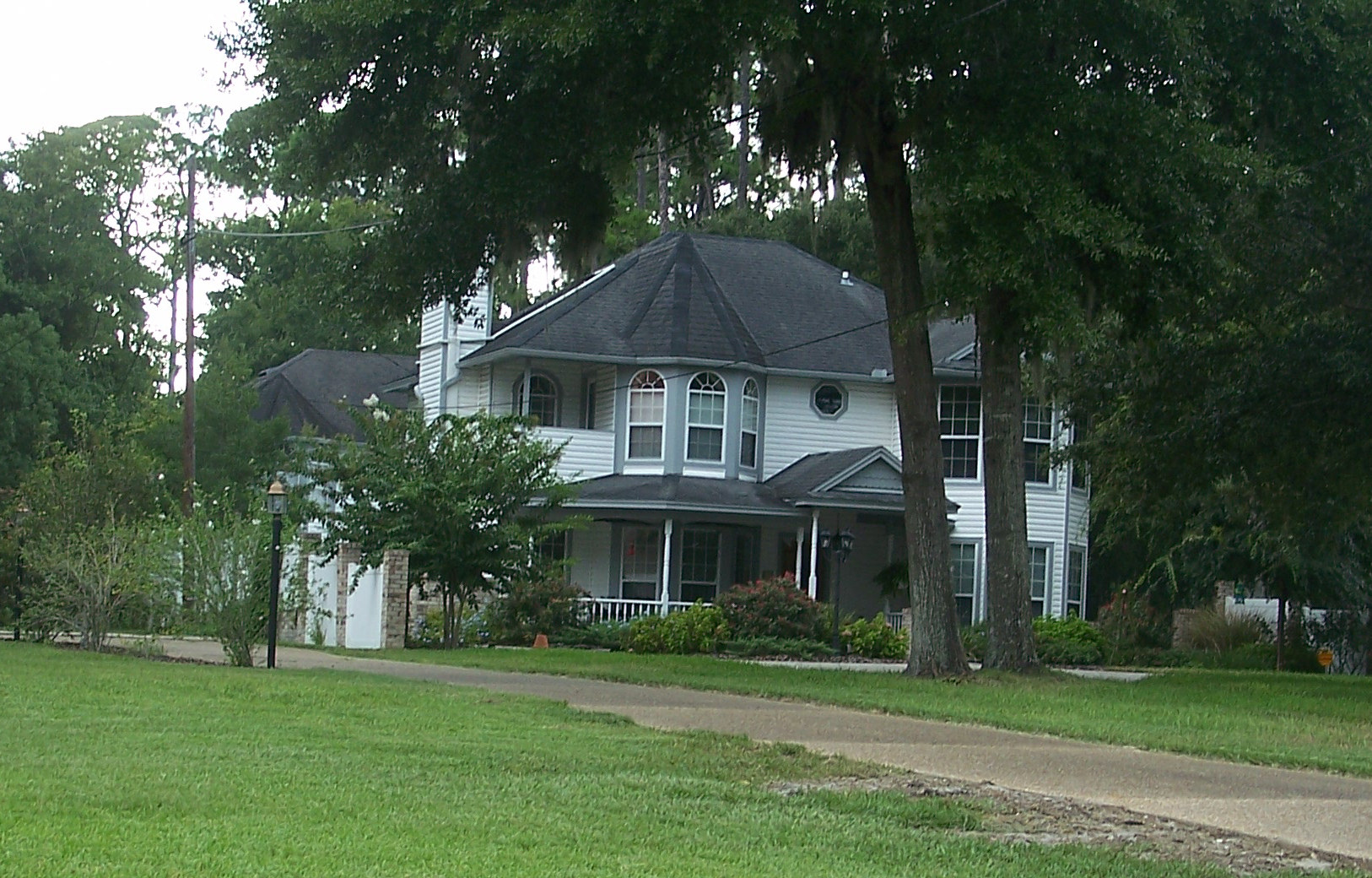

- Location within Florida Location within the United States
- Location: Orange Park, Florida
- Coordinates: 30°10′20″N 81°41′53″W
- Area: 50 acres (200,000 m^{2})
- MPS: Orange Park, Florida MPS
- NRHP reference No.: 98000861
- Added to NRHP: July 15, 1998

The River Road Historic District is a U.S. historic district (designated as such on July 15, 1998) located in Orange Park, Florida. The district is at the junction of River Road and Stiles Avenue. It contains ten historic buildings.
