= Princess Mound =

- Princess Mound (8CL85)
- U.S. National Register of Historic Places
- Location within Florida Location within the United States
- Location: Clay County, Florida
- Nearest city: Green Cove Springs
- Coordinates: 30.09°N 81.72°W
- NRHP reference No.: 90000311
- Added to NRHP: March 2, 1990

The Princess Mound is a historic site near Green Cove Springs, Florida. It is located on Fleming Island, northwest of Green Cove Springs. On March 2, 1990, it was added to the U.S. National Register of Historic Places.

== See also ==
- List of burial mounds in the United States
