= Holly Cottage =

- U.S. National Register of Historic Places
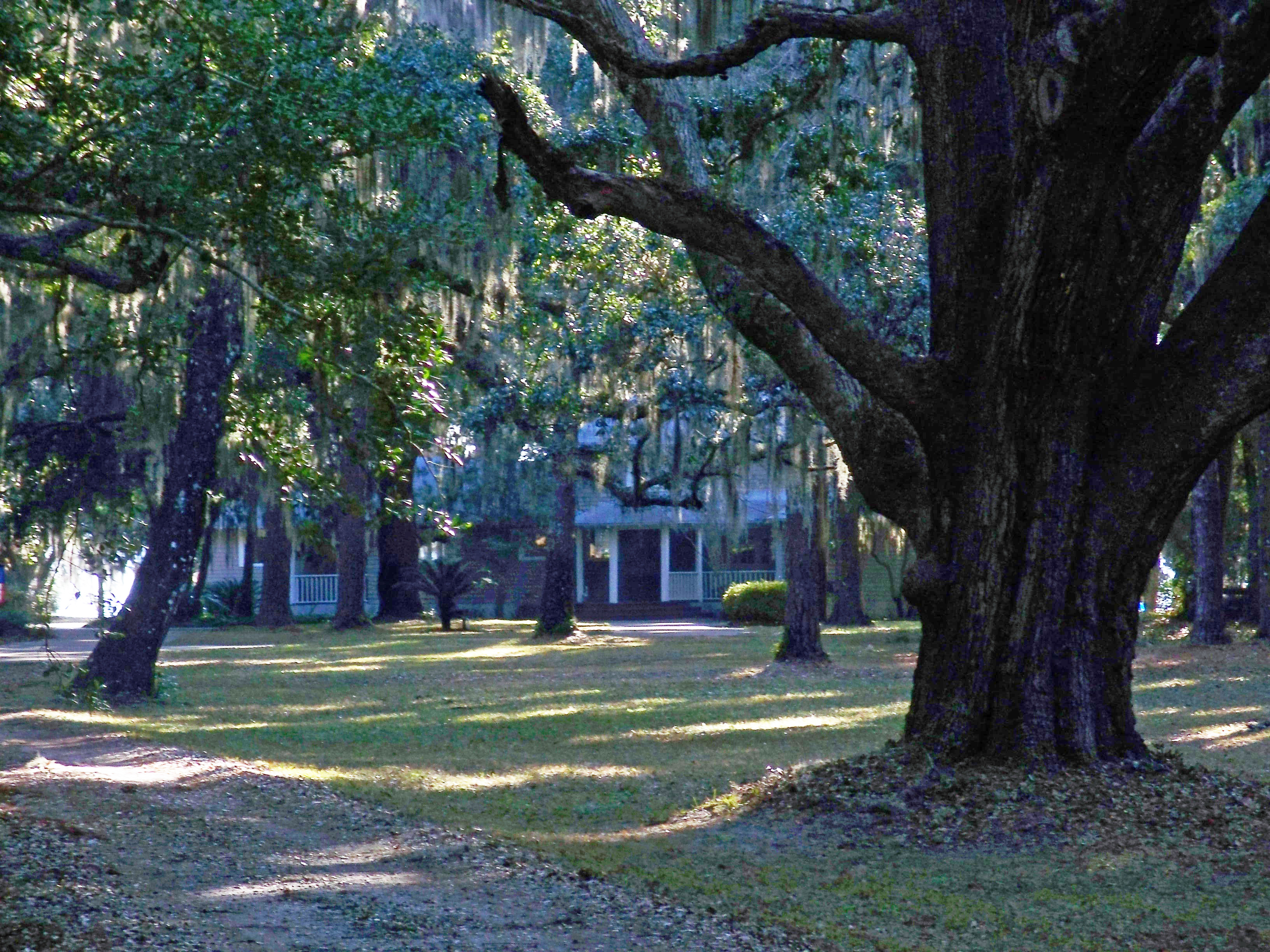

- Location within Florida Location within the United States
- Location: Green Cove Springs, Florida
- Coordinates: 30.065°N 81.696667°W
- NRHP reference No.: 10000442
- Added to NRHP: July 8, 2010

Holly Cottage is an historic building near Green Cove Springs, Florida. It was constructed in the late 19th century. The cottage is the only surviving building of the Hibernia Winter Resort, a winter retreat that operated from the 1850s through 1940. The resort helped in reviving tourism to Florida after the Civil War. The cottage was added to the National Register of Historic Places on July 8, 2010.
