= Winterbourne (Orange Park, Florida) =

Historic house in Florida, United States

- U.S. National Register of Historic Places
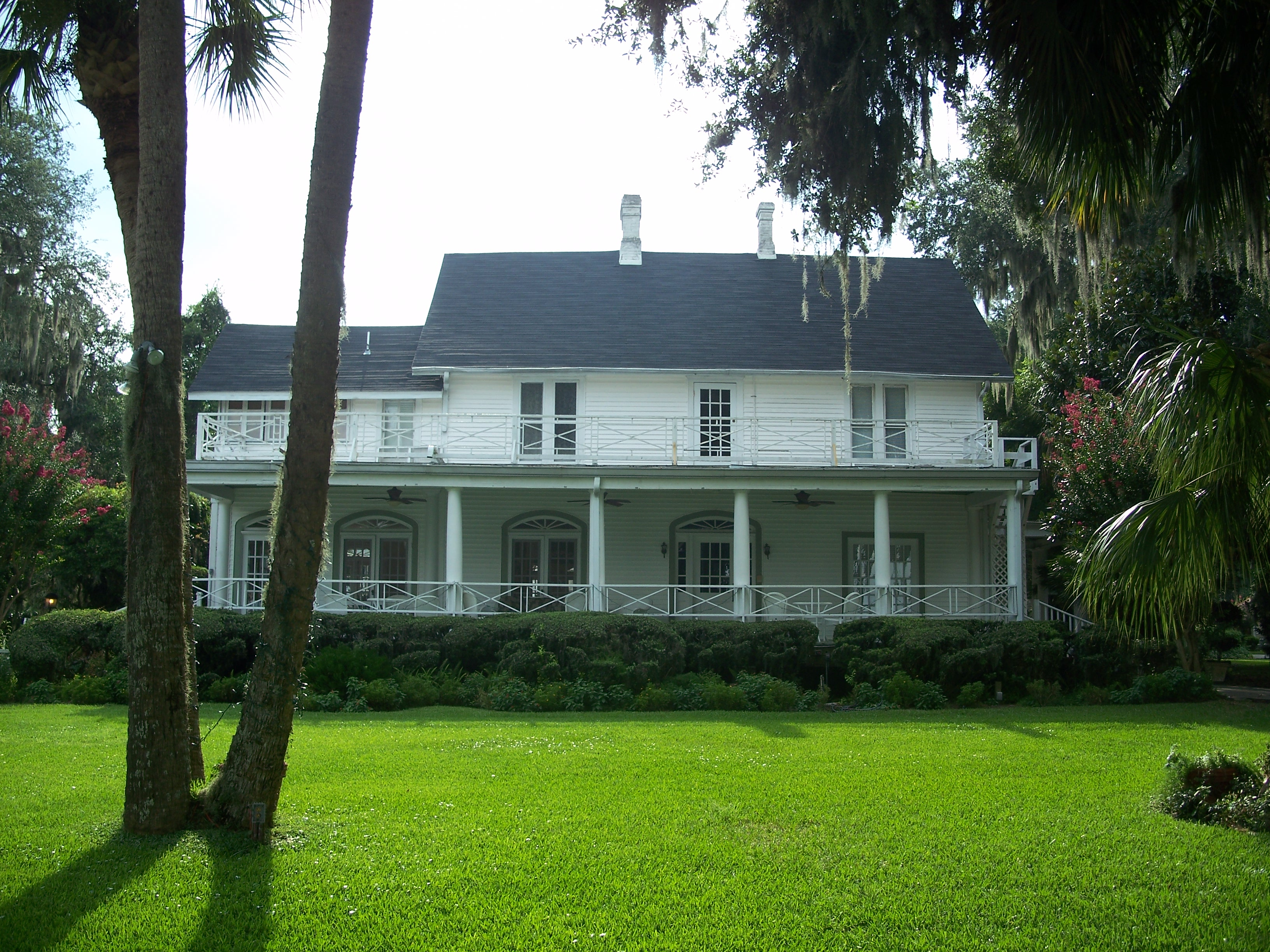

- Location within Florida Location within the United States
- Location: Orange Park, Florida
- Coordinates: 30°9′56″N 81°41′45″W
- NRHP reference No.: 96000161
- Added to NRHP: February 23, 1996

Winterbourne (also known as the John Ferguson House) is a historic home in Orange Park, Florida. It is located at 2104 Winterbourne West, along on the St. Johns River. On February 23, 1996, it was added to the U.S. National Register of Historic Places.
