= William N. Sheats =

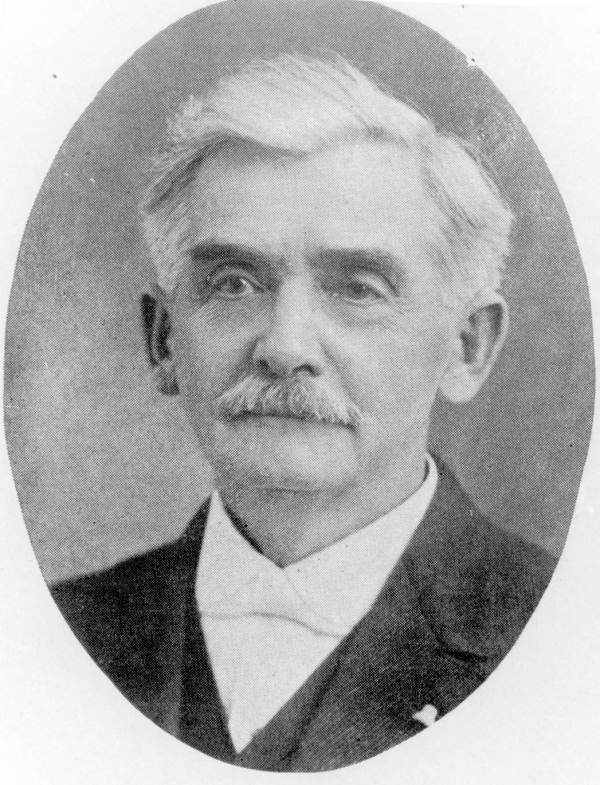
- Born: 5 March 1851
- Died: 19 July 1922 (aged 71)
- Occupation: Educator, superintendent

William Nicholas Sheats (March 5, 1851 – July 19, 1922) was an American educator and politician who was called the "Father of Florida's Public School System." He was state superintendent of public education in Florida from 1893 to 1905, and again from 1913 to 1922.

== Life and career ==
William Nicholas Sheats was born on March 5, 1851, on a cotton farm near Auburn, Georgia, and referred to himself as a "Georgia cracker." He earned an A.B. in 1873 and an A.M. in 1876 from Emory University. His career took him from teacher and superintendent of schools in Alachua County, Florida, to his role as superintendent of public instruction for the entire state of Florida.

Sheats was a paternalistic racist, insisting on segregation between Black and white students in all levels of education. His beliefs led him to lobby the 1894 legislature for a new law to be passed. The Sheats Law, passed in 1895, prohibited white teachers from instructing Black students and forbid Black and white students from learning in the same classroom, even if the schools were privately operated.

This law affected the only privately operated school in Florida that had integrated, the Orange Park Normal & Industrial School. The law led to the arrest of the school's principal, several educators and patrons, and a minister in 1896. They were "charged with the crime of educating students at a desegregated school."

Sheats died in office in 1922. During his tenure, he fortified Florida's compulsory school attendance law as well as standardized teacher training and textbook selection.
