= Orange Park Negro Elementary School =

- U.S. National Register of Historic Places
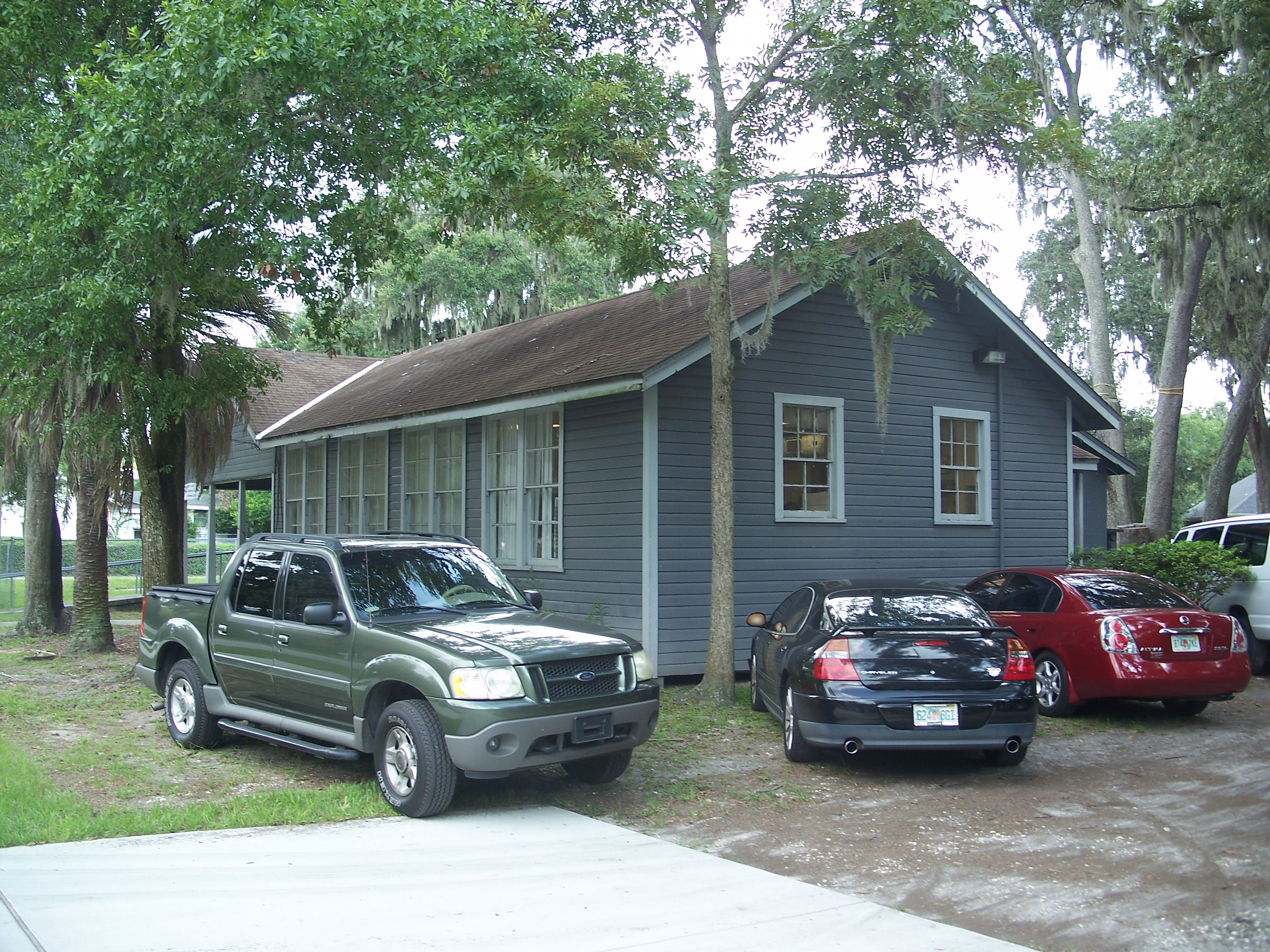

- Location within Florida Location within the United States
- Location: Orange Park, Florida
- Coordinates: 30°10′02″N 81°42′14″W
- MPS: Orange Park, Florida MPS
- NRHP reference No.: 98000856
- Added to NRHP: July 15, 1998

The Orange Park Negro Elementary School (also known as the Teresa Miller School or Neighborhood Service Center) is a historic school in Orange Park, Florida. It is located at 440 McIntosh Avenue. On July 15, 1998, it was added to the U.S. National Register of Historic Places.
