= Memorial Home Community Historic District =

Historic district in Florida, United States

- U.S. National Register of Historic Places
- U.S. Historic district
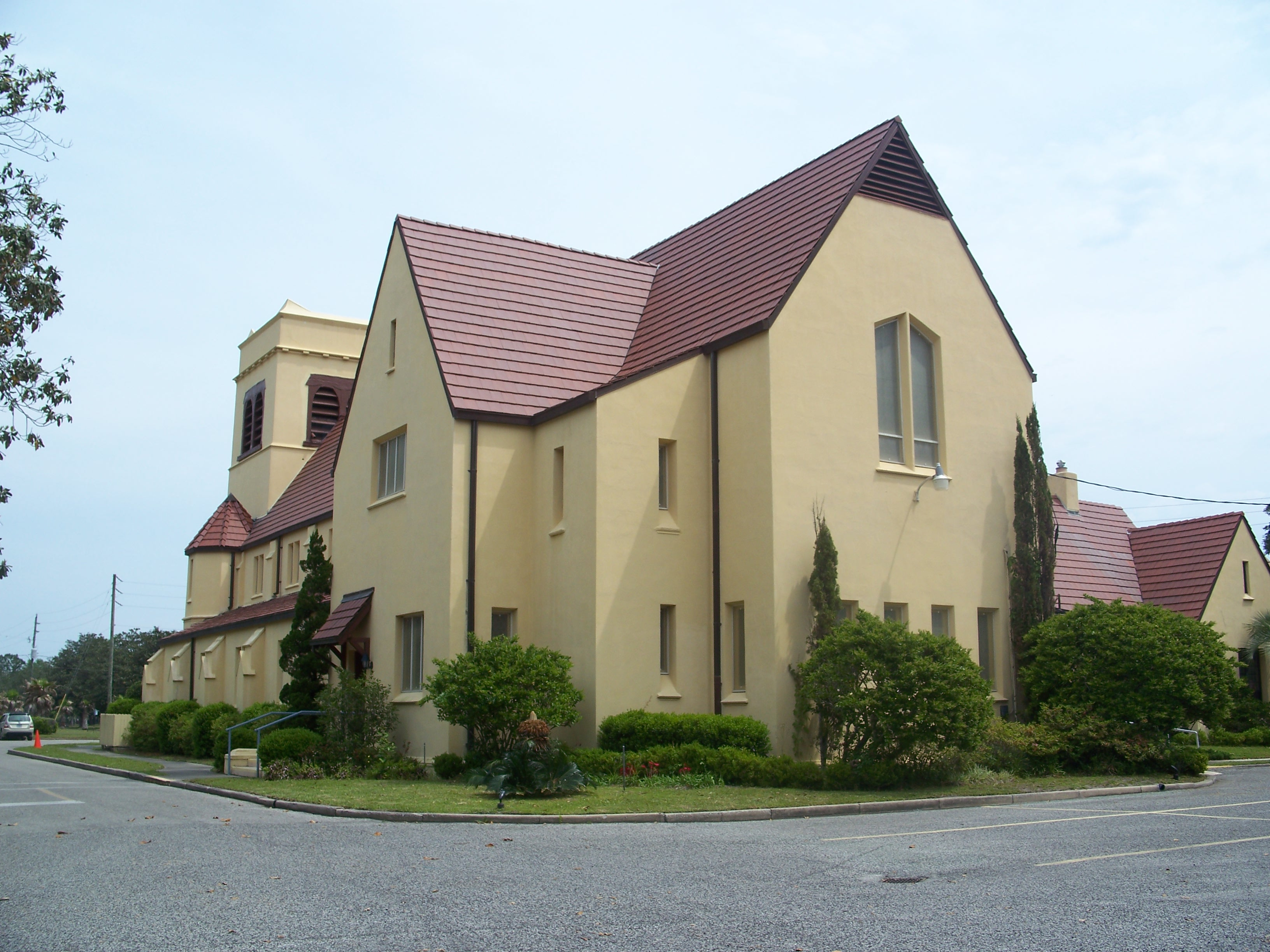

- Location within Florida Location within the United States
- Location: Penney Farms, Florida
- Coordinates: 29°58′56″N 81°48′29″W
- Area: 600 acres (240 ha)
- NRHP reference No.: 99000047
- Added to NRHP: February 3, 1999

The Memorial Home Community Historic District (also known as Penney Retirement Community) is a U.S. historic district (designated as such on February 3, 1999) located in Penney Farms, Florida. The district is bounded by SR 16, Caroline Boulevard, Wilbanks Avenue, and Studio Road. It contains 24 historic buildings and 2 structures.
