= Orange Park Elementary School =

- U.S. National Register of Historic Places
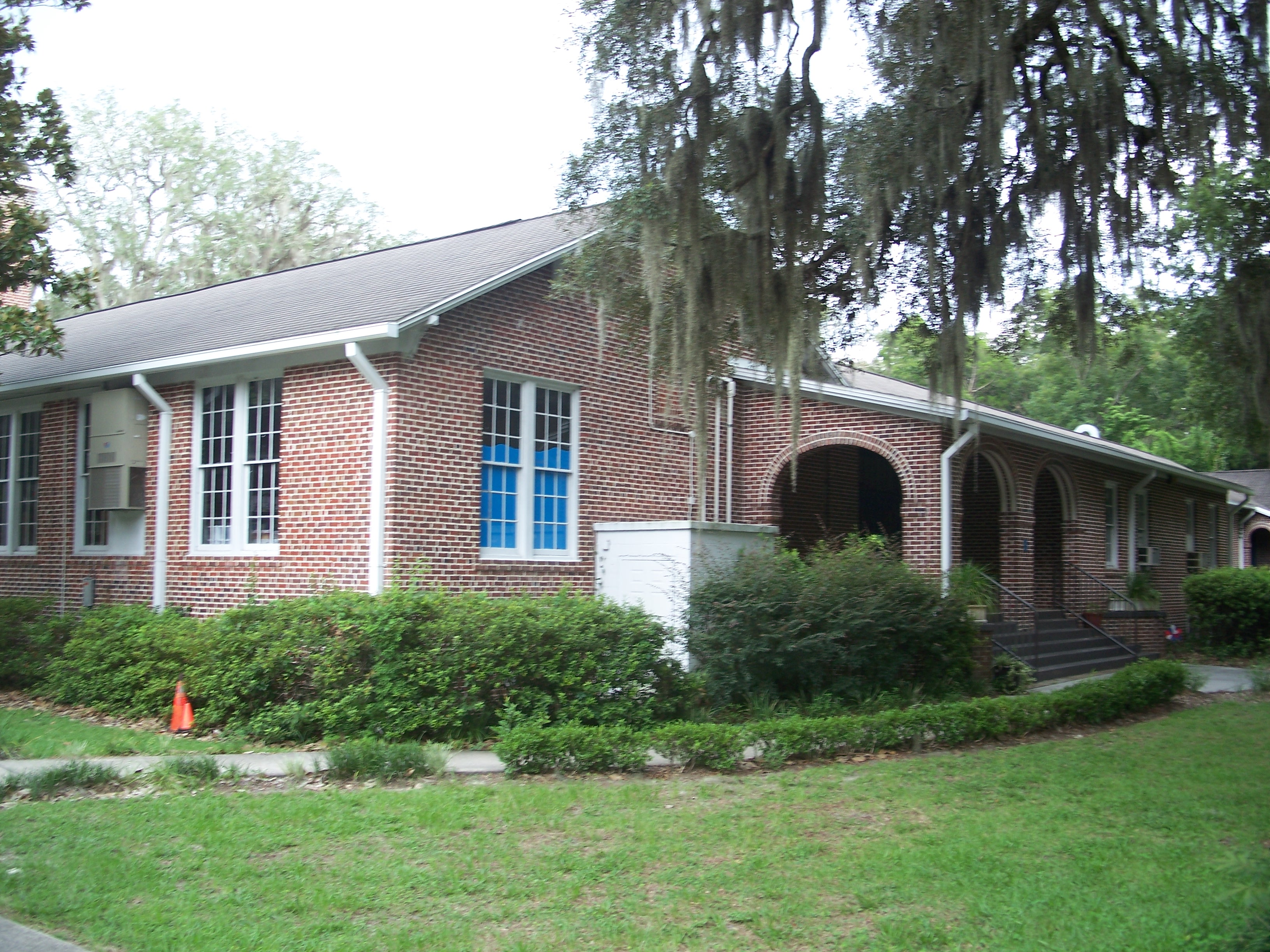

- Location within Florida Location within the United States
- Location: Orange Park, Florida
- Coordinates: 30°10′21″N 81°42′19″W
- MPS: Orange Park, Florida MPS
- NRHP reference No.: 98000858
- Added to NRHP: July 15, 1998

The Orange Park Elementary School is a historic school in Orange Park, Florida. It is located at 1401 Plainfield Avenue. On July 15, 1998, it was added to the U.S. National Register of Historic Places. Orange Park Elementary was established in 1927 and so it is the oldest school in Clay County.
