= Orange Park, Florida =

Town in Florida, United States

Town of Orange Park
- Town
- Town of Orange Park, Florida
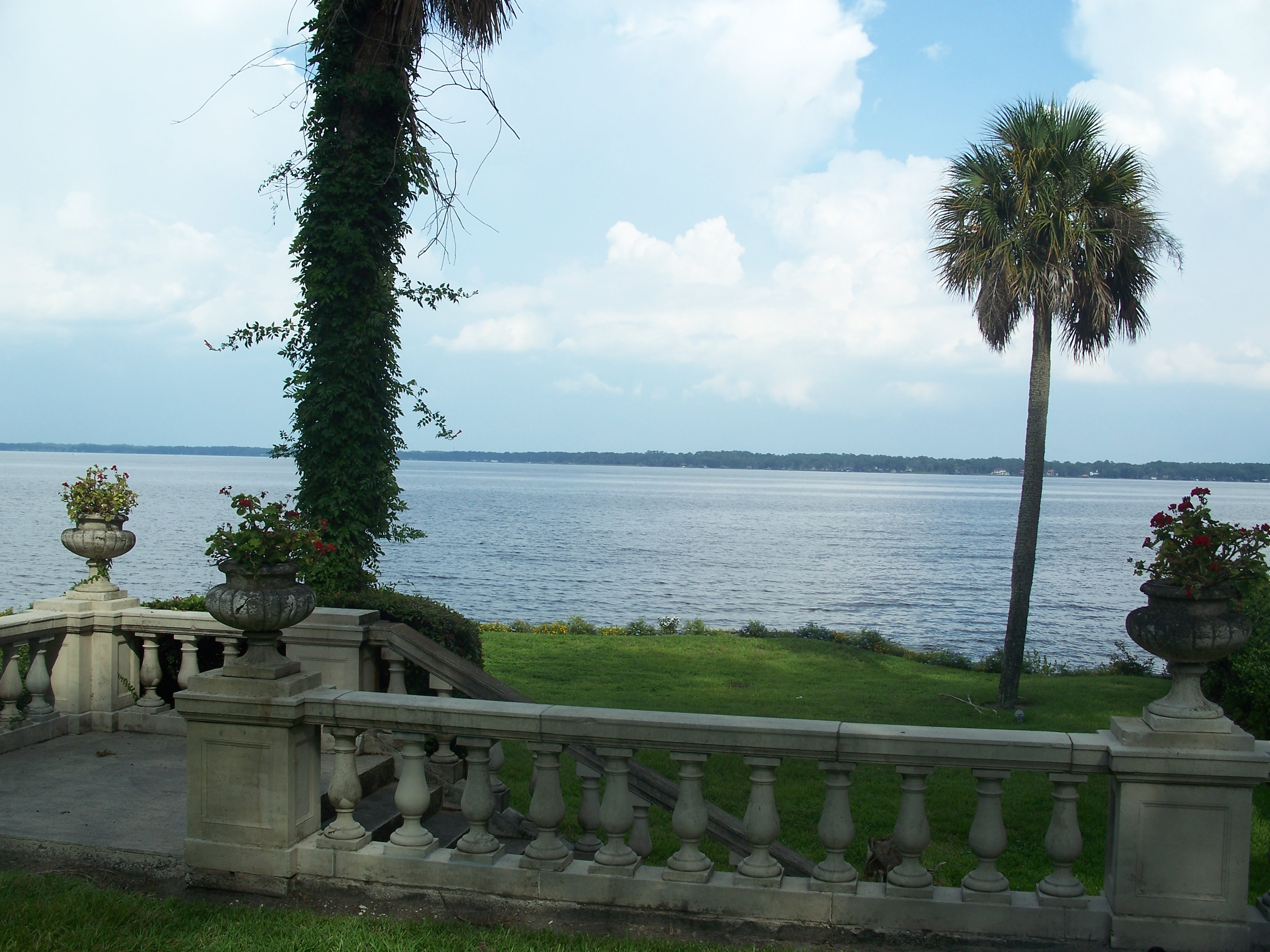
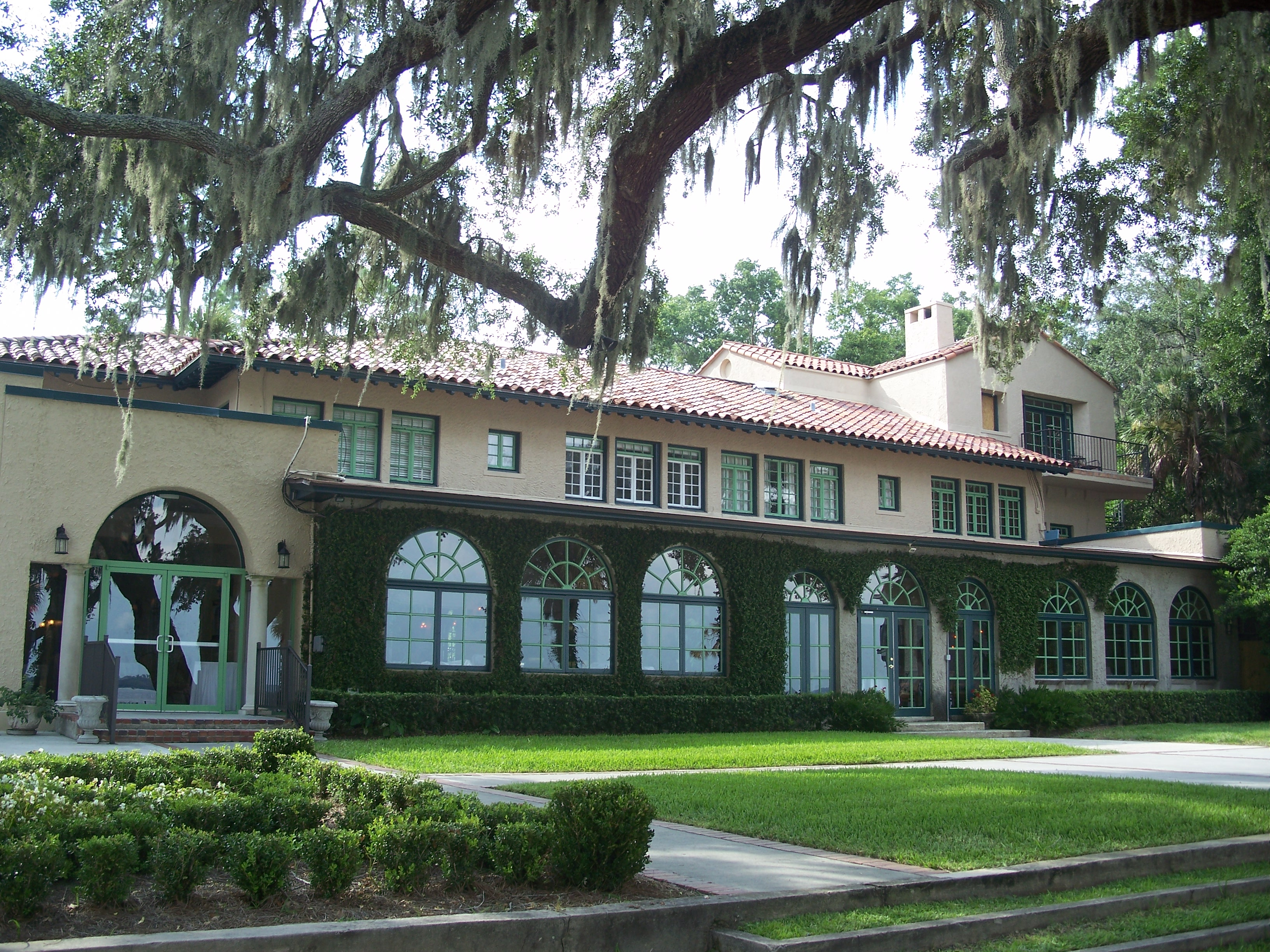
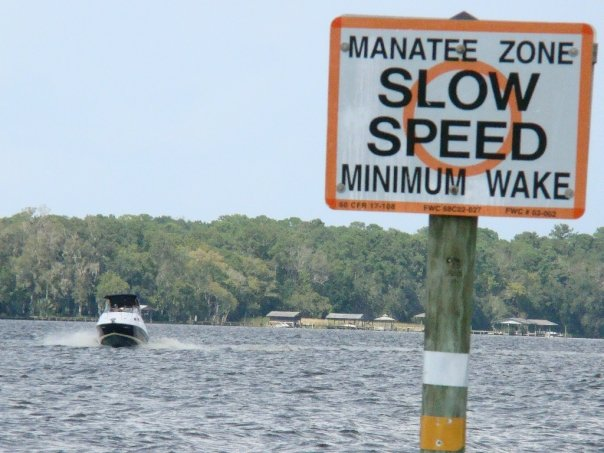
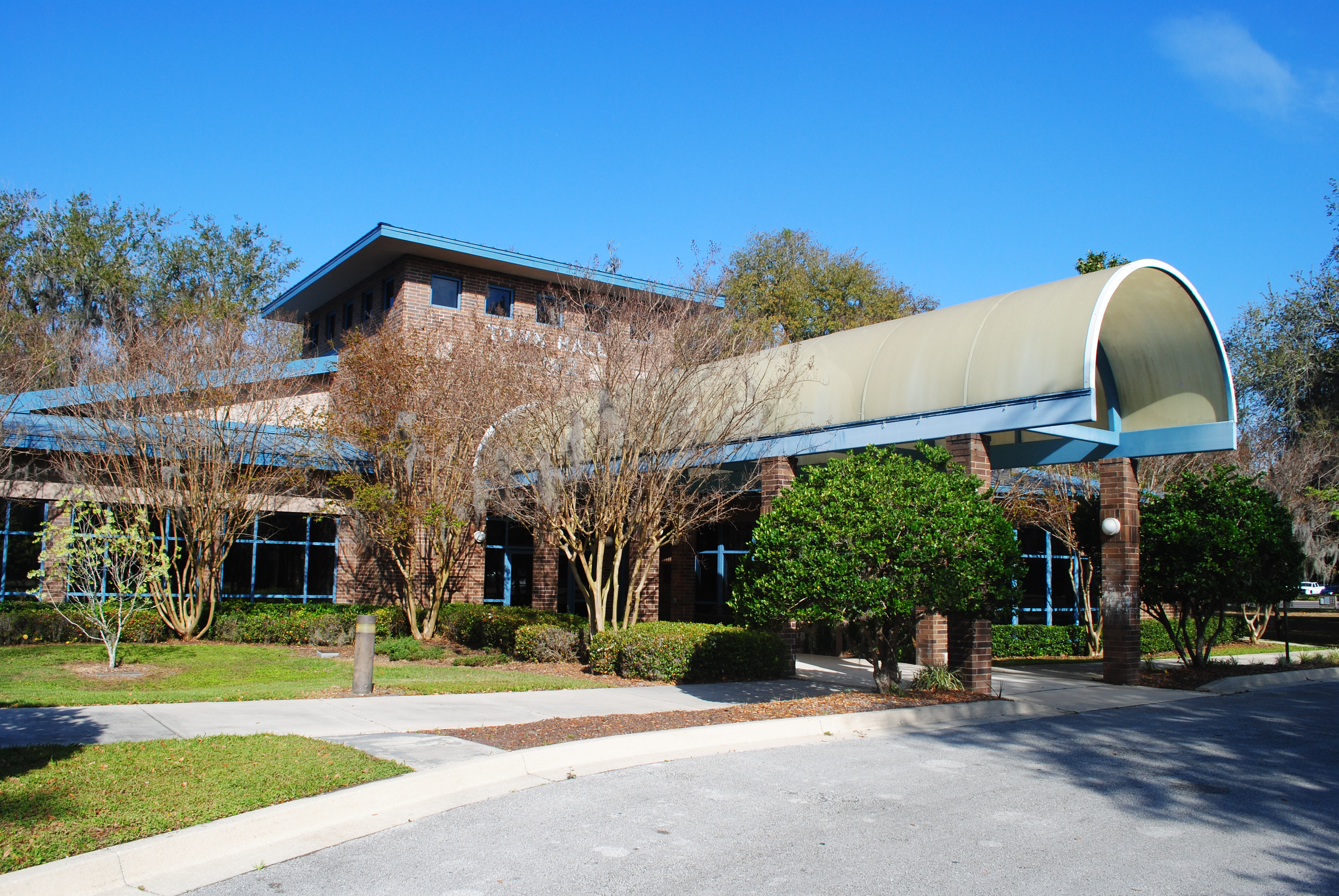
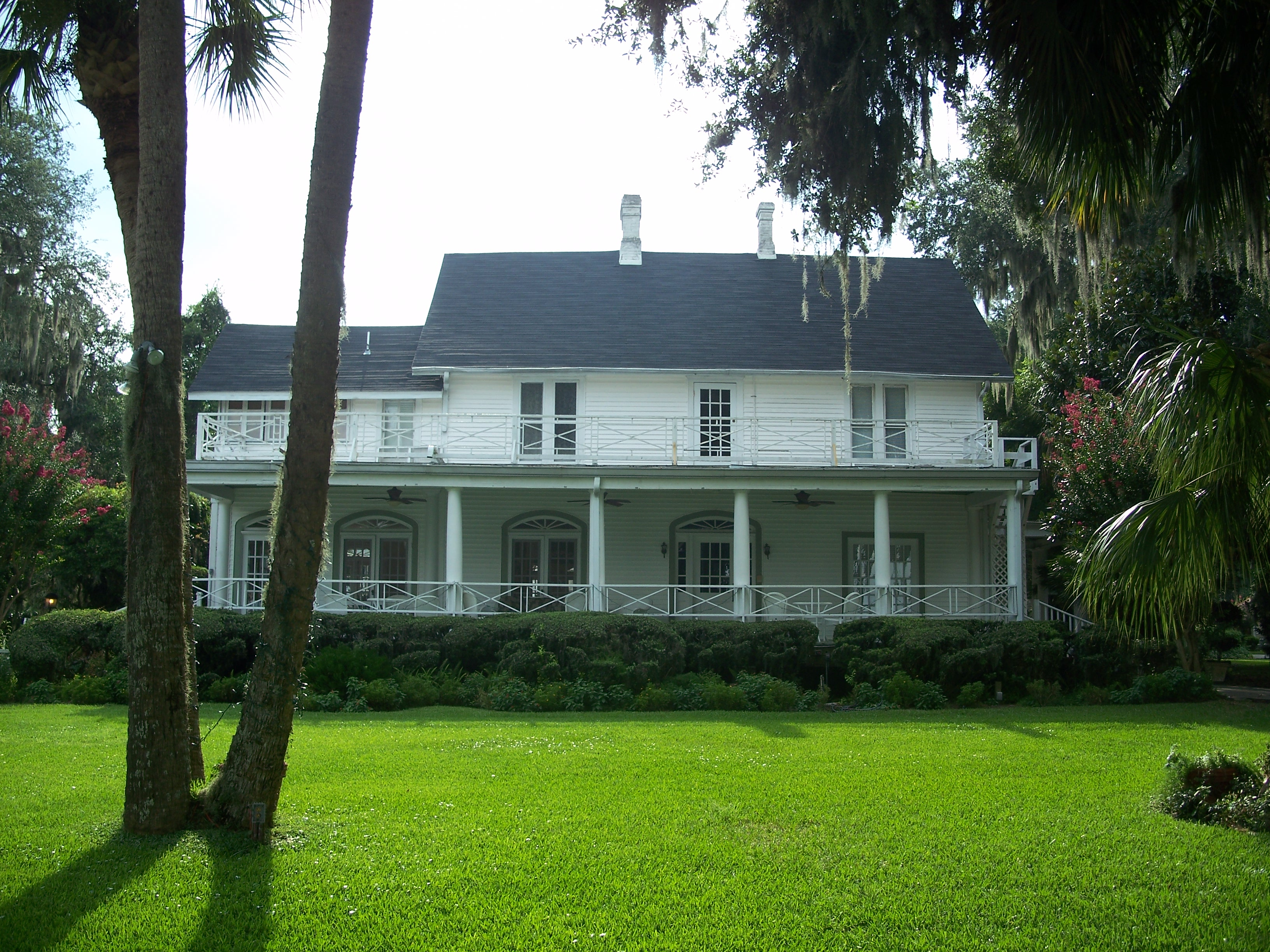
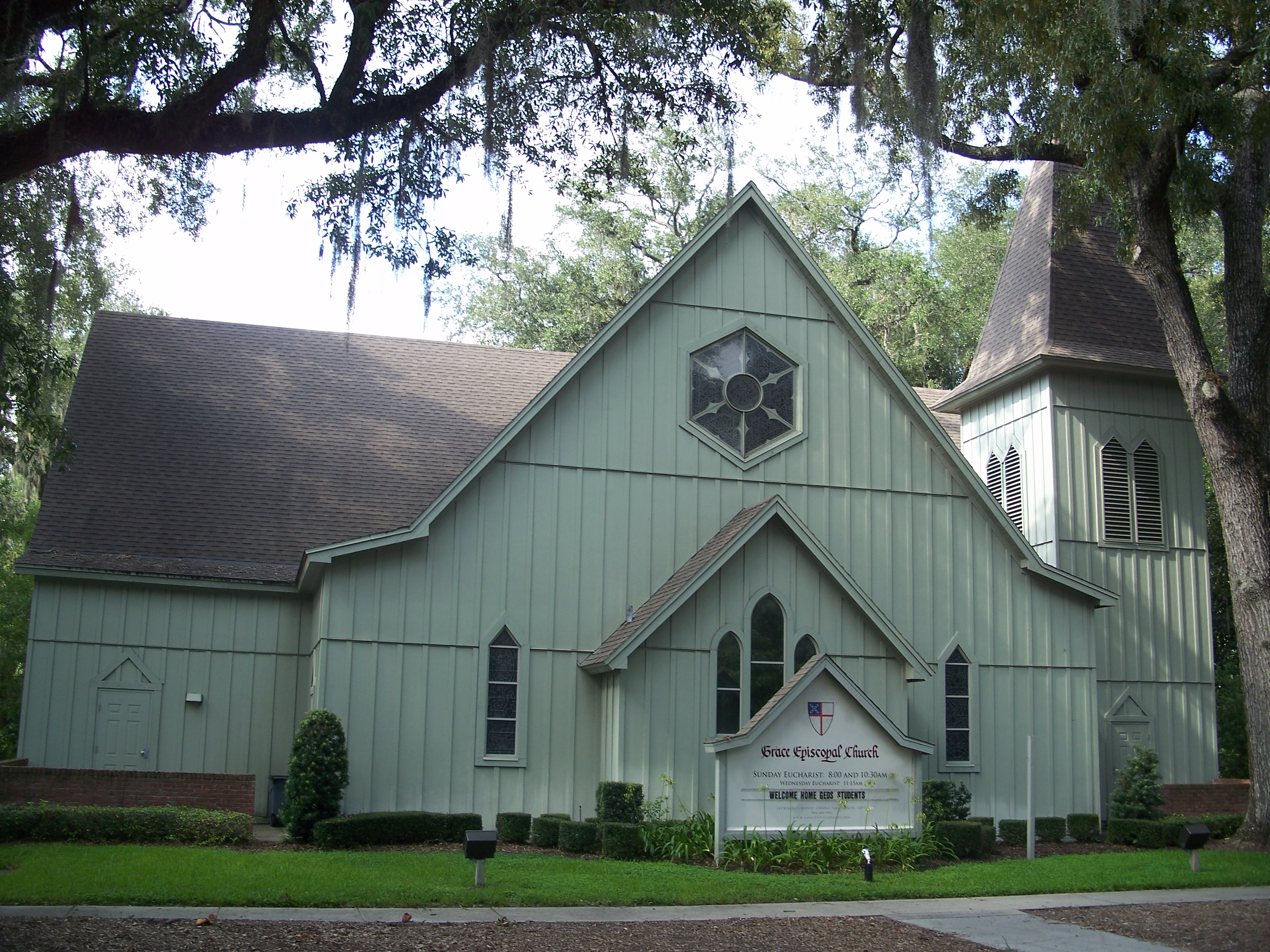
- View of the St. Johns River behind Club Continental Club Continental Doctors Lake Orange Park Town Hall Winterbourne Grace Episcopal Church

- Location in Clay County and the state of Florida
- Coordinates: 30°10′14″N 81°42′15″W
- Country: United States
- State: Florida
- County: Clay
- Incorporated: 1877

Government
  - Type: Council-Manager

Area
  - Total: 5.32 sq mi (13.78 km^{2})
  - Land: 3.64 sq mi (9.42 km^{2})
  - Water: 1.68 sq mi (4.36 km^{2})
- Elevation: 13 ft (4.0 m)

Population (2020)
  - Total: 9,089
  - Density: 2,498.1/sq mi (964.51/km^{2})
- Time zone: UTC-5 (Eastern (EST))
  - Summer (DST): UTC-4 (EDT)
- ZIP codes: 32073
- Area codes: 904, 324
- FIPS code: 12-52125
- GNIS feature ID: 2407050
- Website: townoforangepark.com

Orange Park is a town in Clay County, Florida, United States. As a suburb of Jacksonville in neighboring Duval County, it is formally a part of the Jacksonville, Florida Metropolitan Statistical Area. The population was 9,089 at the 2020 census, up from 8,412 from the 2010 census. while the Town of Orange Park is only 5.32 sq mi large, Orange Park is the designated city on all addresses for all homes and businesses within the zip codes 32065 and 32073, which includes Lakeside, Bellair-Meadowbrook Terrace and Oakleaf Plantation.

The town's name reflects the hope of its founders for a fruit-growing industry, but their crops were destroyed in the Great Freeze of 1894–1895. Despite recovery elsewhere, the crops never came back to Orange Park.

== History ==
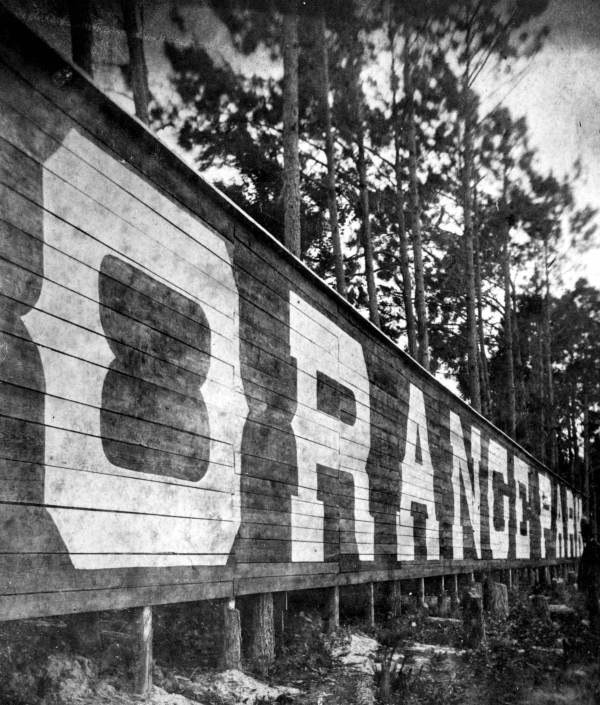
Orange Park sign in the 1890s

Orange Park in the late 18th century was known simply as Laurel Grove. The name Laurel Grove comes from Sarah and William Pengree, who received a land grant from the Spanish governor. Laurel Grove was sold to Zephaniah Kingsley, of the Kingsley Plantation, upon William's death. Zephaniah developed Laurel Grove into a model farming plantation for over 10 years. In 1813, General Matthews invaded East Florida, triggering the Patriots' Rebellion. After Mathews left East Florida, Zephaniah's wife, Anna Madgigine Jai Kingsley, burned down Laurel Grove to keep it out of Patriots' hands.

The Town of Orange Park was founded, in 1877, by the Florida Winter Home and Improvement Company. After the Civil War, the company bought several thousand acres of the McIntosh plantation at Laurel Grove, for the purpose of creating a southern retreat and small farming community. The property was divided into building lots and small farm tracts, division that involved laying out the present street system, including Kingsley Avenue and Plainfield Avenue. The town was incorporated in 1879 by a special act of the Florida Legislature. In January 1880, Ulysses S. Grant and Philip Sheridan visited Orange Park. A large hotel was built at Kingsley Avenue along with a 1,200-foot pier. In 1895, the local fruit-growing industry was destroyed in the Great Freeze of 1895.

In October 1891, the Orange Park Normal & Industrial School was opened. The school was founded by the American Missionary Association and allowed for both black and white students to attend, the only unsegragated school in Florida at the time. However, by the end of 1913, the school was closed due to Jim Crow laws.

In 1922, the Loyal Order of Moose, a fraternal organization, bought the former Hotel Marion in downtown Orange Park and rebuilt the property into Moosehaven, a 63-acre retirement community that is exclusively for its senior members.

Orange Park Elementary School, built in 1927, continues to operate a few blocks from the river. It is near Moose Haven, in the River Road Historic District, a stretch of road parallel to the Saint Johns River and dotted with century-old trees, where many locals come to walk and jog in the afternoon. About a quarter of a mile away is Club Continental, previously called Mira Rio. Mira Rio, whose name was Spanish for "River Watch", was the winter palazzo of Caleb Johnson, son of the founder of the Palmolive Soap Company, now the billion-dollar Colgate-Palmolive company.

In 1930, Robert Yerkes, with the support of Yale University, the Rockefeller Foundation, and the Carnegie Foundation, established a research station in Orange Park to study primate biology and behavior. Originally called the Yale Laboratories for Primate Biology, it was renamed the Yerkes Laboratory of Primate Biology after Yerkes retired in 1941. In 1956, ownership of the laboratory was transferred to Emory University. The laboratory became the Yerkes National Primate Research Center; it was moved to the Emory University campus in Georgia in 1965.

== Geography ==
Orange Park is in the northeast corner of Clay County, on the St. Johns River. Orange Park is a suburb of Jacksonville which borders it to the north. Greater Orange Park encompasses the unincorporated communities of Fleming Island, Ridgewood, Doctors Inlet, Orange Park South, Lakeside, and Bellair-Meadowbrook Terrace.

According to the United States Census Bureau, the town has a total area of 5.3 square miles (13.7 km^{2}), of which 3.6 square miles (9.4 km^{2}) is land and 1.7 square miles (4.4 km^{2}) (31.71%) is water.

Many households are affiliated with the military; NAS Jacksonville is less than 6 miles (10 km) away. Many others are in the medical field.

== Demographics ==
Historical population
Census	Pop.	Note	%±
1880	134		—
1890	228		70.1%
1900	245		7.5%
1910	372		51.8%
1920	333		−10.5%
1930	661		98.5%
1940	668		1.1%
1950	1,502		124.9%
1960	2,624		74.7%
1970	5,019		91.3%
1980	8,766		74.7%
1990	9,488		8.2%
2000	9,081		−4.3%
2010	8,412		−7.4%
2020	9,089		8.0%
U.S. Decennial Census

=== Racial and ethnic composition ===
Orange Park racial composition (Hispanics excluded from racial categories) (NH = Non-Hispanic)
Race	Pop 2010	Pop 2020	% 2010	% 2020
White (NH)	5,968	5,976	70.95%	65.75%
Black or African American (NH)	1,199	1,337	14.25%	14.71%
Native American or Alaska Native (NH)	26	27	0.31%	0.30%
Asian (NH)	263	269	3.13%	2.96%
Pacific Islander or Native Hawaiian (NH)	5	17	0.06%	0.19%
Some other race (NH)	7	48	0.08%	0.53%
Two or more races/Multiracial (NH)	204	424	2.43%	4.66%
Hispanic or Latino (any race)	740	991	8.80%	10.90%
Total	8,412	9,089		

=== 2020 census ===
As of the 2020 census, Orange Park had a population of 9,089. The median age was 48.9 years. 17.8% of residents were under the age of 18 and 28.7% of residents were 65 years of age or older. For every 100 females there were 90.1 males, and for every 100 females age 18 and over there were 86.8 males age 18 and over.

100.0% of residents lived in urban areas, while 0.0% lived in rural areas.

There were 3,559 households in Orange Park, of which 26.8% had children under the age of 18 living in them. Of all households, 42.6% were married-couple households, 19.3% were households with a male householder and no spouse or partner present, and 31.8% were households with a female householder and no spouse or partner present. About 30.0% of all households were made up of individuals and 15.5% had someone living alone who was 65 years of age or older.

There were 3,985 housing units, of which 10.7% were vacant. The homeowner vacancy rate was 1.6% and the rental vacancy rate was 13.9%.

=== Demographic estimates ===
In the 2020 American Community Survey 5-year estimates, there were 2,271 families residing in the city.

=== 2010 census ===
As of the 2010 United States census, there were 8,412 people, 3,524 households, and 2,079 families residing in the city.

=== 2000 census ===
As of the census of 2000, there are 9,081 people, 3,429 households, and 2,362 families residing in the town. The population density was 2,331.1 inhabitants per square mile (900.0/km^{2}). There were 3,648 housing units at an average density of 936.4 per square mile (361.5/km^{2}). The racial makeup of the town is 82.95% White, 10.96% African American, 0.52% Native American, 2.31% Asian, 0.04% Pacific Islander, 1.44% from other races, and 1.77% from two or more races. 4.60% of the population are Hispanic or Latino of any race.

In 2000, there are 3,429 households out of which 28.7% have children under the age of 18 living with them, 53.9% are married couples living together, 11.9% have a female householder with no husband present, and 31.1% are non-families. 25.4% of all households are made up of individuals and 9.0% have someone living alone who is 65 years of age or older. The average household size is 2.45 and the average family size is 2.92.

In 2000, in the town, the population was spread out, with 21.0% under the age of 18, 7.9% from 18 to 24, 24.8% from 25 to 44, 25.3% from 45 to 64, and 21.0% who were 65 years of age or older. The median age was 43 years. For every 100 females, there were 90.3 males. For every 100 females age 18 and over, there were 87.7 males.

In 2000, the median income for a household in the town was $47,631, and the median income for a family was $58,093. Males had a median income of $36,590 versus $26,846 for females. The per capita income for the town was $24,087. About 4.6% of families and 7.5% of the population were below the poverty line, including 10.8% of those under age 18, 17.1% of those age 65 or over.

== Education ==
Orange Park is in the Clay County School District and has three public elementary schools, two public junior high schools, and three public high schools Another ten public elementary schools, two public junior high schools, and three public high schools are outside the town limits. Orange Park also has several private schools. St Johns Country Day School is Pre-K - 12 Grade and a top ranked school in Florida.Fortis College, a for-profit two-year college is in Orange Park, as is a campus of St. Johns River State College.

Orange Park High School is the closest public high school, 1 mile (2 km) west of the town limits. Oakleaf High School is the second closest public high school, about two miles southwest of the town limits. Ridgeview High School is the third, about three miles south of the town limits.

== Notable people ==
- Kat Cole, former CEO of Cinnabon
- Dane Dunning, MLB baseball player
- Steve Gaines, former member of Lynyrd Skynyrd
- Hank Garland, guitarist and songwriter
- Nassir Little, NBA player
- Terrance Plummer, former NFL linebacker
- Billy Powell, keyboardist of Lynyrd Skynyrd
- Shaquille Quarterman, NFL linebacker for the Jacksonville Jaguars
- Colleen Slemmer, murder victim in 1995
- Christie Lynn Smith, actress
- Ronnie Van Zant, former member of Lynyrd Skynyrd
- Adrian White, NFL defensive back and coach
- Dez White, retired NFL wide receiver
- Slim Whitman, country music singer-songwriter

== Transportation ==
=== Roadways ===
The Town of Orange Park is built around the intersection of 2 Major Roads: US 17 and Florida SR 224.

- US 17 / Park Avenue
- SR 224 / Kingsley Avenue Park Avenue is Orange Park's main street and connects the town northbound to the city of Jacksonville and I-295, and southbound to the bridge to Fleming Island. Kingsley Avenue is the other main street and connects Orange Park to the neighboring Bellair-Meadowbrook Terrace. Other major roads include Wells Road connecting the northern half of Orange Park to the northern half of Bellair-Meadowbrook Terrace. Deberry Avenue connects Kingsley Avenue in Orange Park to Wells Road in Bellair-Meadowbrook Terrace. Doctor's Lake Road also directly connects Kingsley Ave. in Orange Park to Lakeside to the southwest.

== Utilities ==
=== Electrical Power ===
The Town of Orange Park has a virtual 100% electrification rate and the sole electrical provider within the city limits is JEA, located in neighboring Jacksonville in Duval County. The cost and usage is about 8₵ per kWh for both residential and commercial customers. The main electrical provider for customers in the surrounding area is Clay Electric Cooperative, Inc., in Keystone Heights, FL. The average household uses about 1,000 kWh of electricity per month, while commercial businesses use an average of 6,600 kWh per month and industrial entities use 78,000 kWh per month.
