= Middleburg MPS =

- U.S. National Register of Historic Places
- Location within Florida Location within the United States
- Location: Middleburg, Florida
- Coordinates: 30°3′3″N 81°54′7″W
- MPS: Historic Buildings of Middleburg, Florida
- NRHP reference No.: 64500119

The following buildings in Middleburg, Florida were added to the National Register of Historic Places as part of the Middleburg Multiple Property Submission (or MPS).

Resource Name	Also known as	Address	City	County	Added
Frosard W. Budington House		3916 Main Street	Middleburg	Clay County	March 9, 1990
George A. Chalker House		2160 Wharf Street	Middleburg	Clay County	March 9, 1990
George Randolph Frisbee, Jr. House		2125 Palmetto Street	Middleburg	Clay County	March 9, 1990
Haskell-Long House		3858 Main Street	Middleburg	Clay County	March 9, 1990
Methodist Episcopal Church at Black Creek		3925 Main Street	Middleburg	Clay County	March 9, 1990
Middleburg Historic District		3881-3895 Main Street and 2145 Wharf Street	Middleburg	Clay County	March 9, 1990
