= Middleburg Historic District (Middleburg, Florida) =

Historic district in Florida, United States

- U.S. National Register of Historic Places
- U.S. Historic district
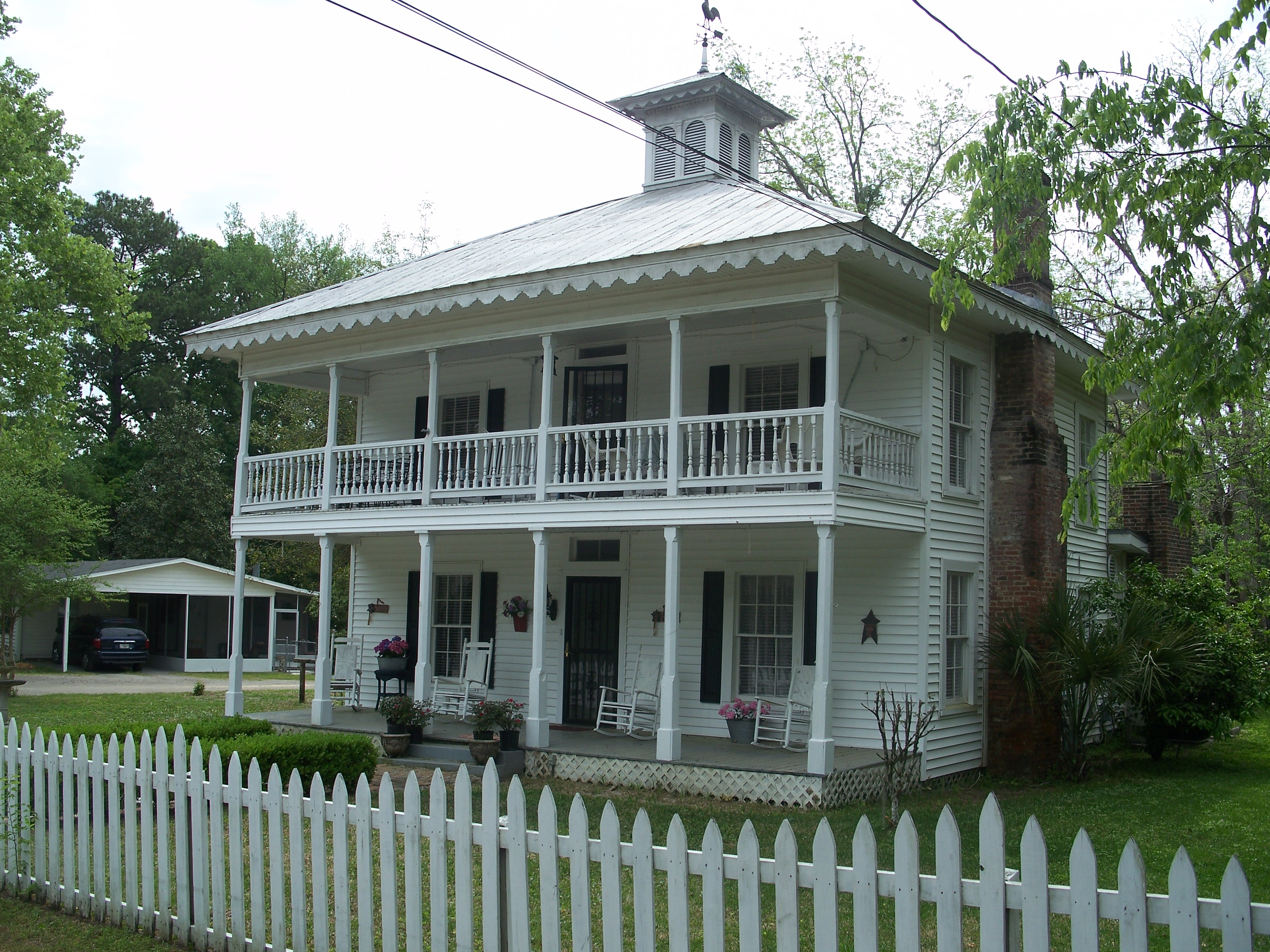
- Side view of the home of George Randolph Frisbee, Jr.

- Location within Florida Location within the United States
- Location: Middleburg, Florida
- Coordinates: 30°4′9″N 81°51′36″W
- Area: 60 acres (240,000 m^{2})
- MPS: Middleburg MPS
- NRHP reference No.: 90000313
- Added to NRHP: March 9, 1990

The Middleburg Historic District is a U.S. historic district designated as such on March 9th, 1990.

Located near Black Creek in Middleburg, Florida, the Middleburg Historic District comprises the following two commemorative plaques and five nationally-designated historic buildings:

- A plaque on Main Street, located across from the Boat Ramp, details the history of the settlement called Garey's Ferry until 1859.
- A sign at the corner Main Street and Wharf Street marks the site of a Union Army raid during the American Civil War.
- Clark-Chalker House: 3891 Main Street
- Haskell-Long House: 3858 Main Street
- Frosard W. Budington House: 3816 Main Street
- George Randolph Frisbee Jr. House: 2125 Palmetto Street
- Edenfield House: at 2160 Wharf Street; Wharf Street was historically Thompson Street)

== Gallery of Historic Homes ==
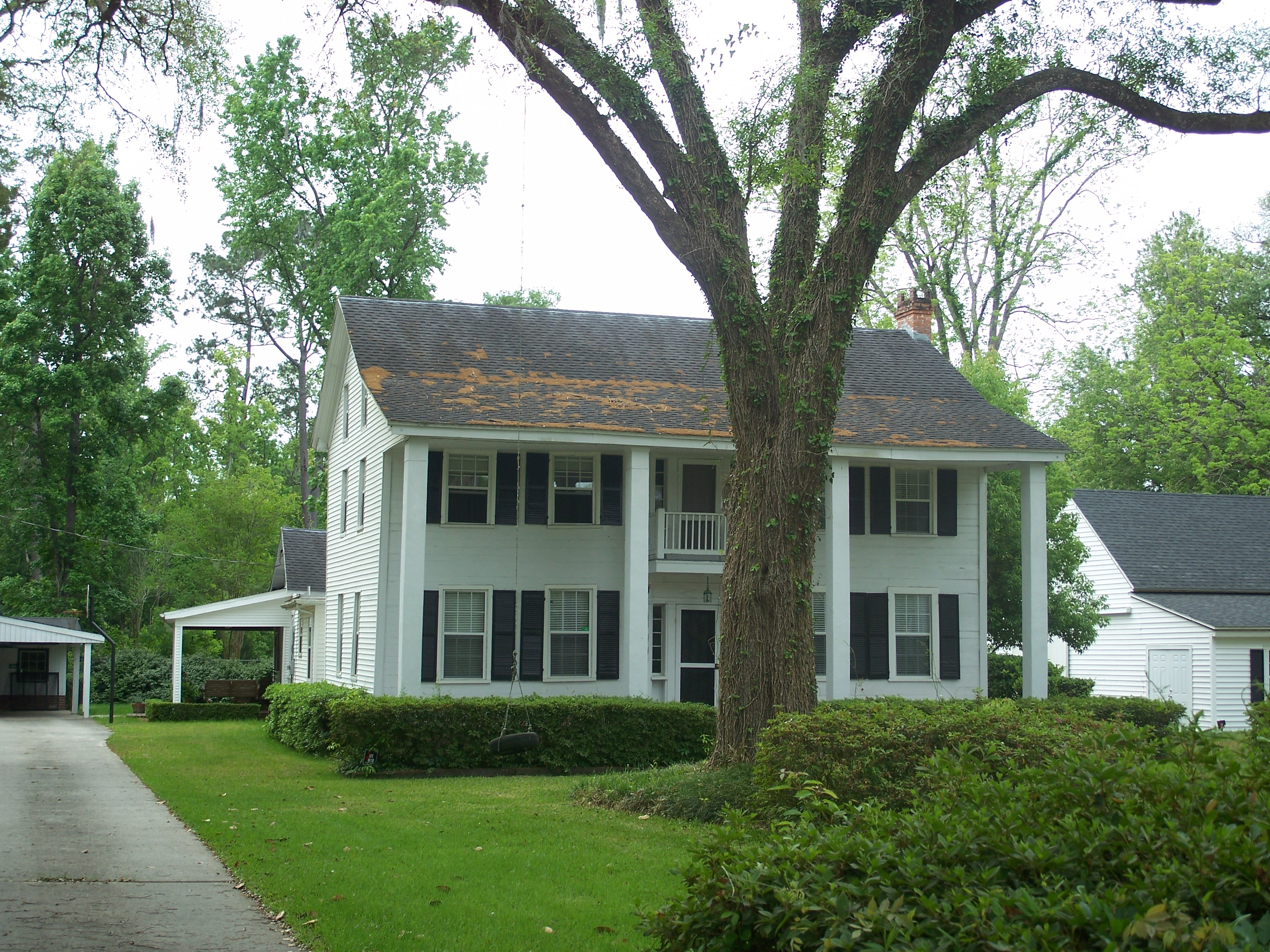
The Clark-Chalker House

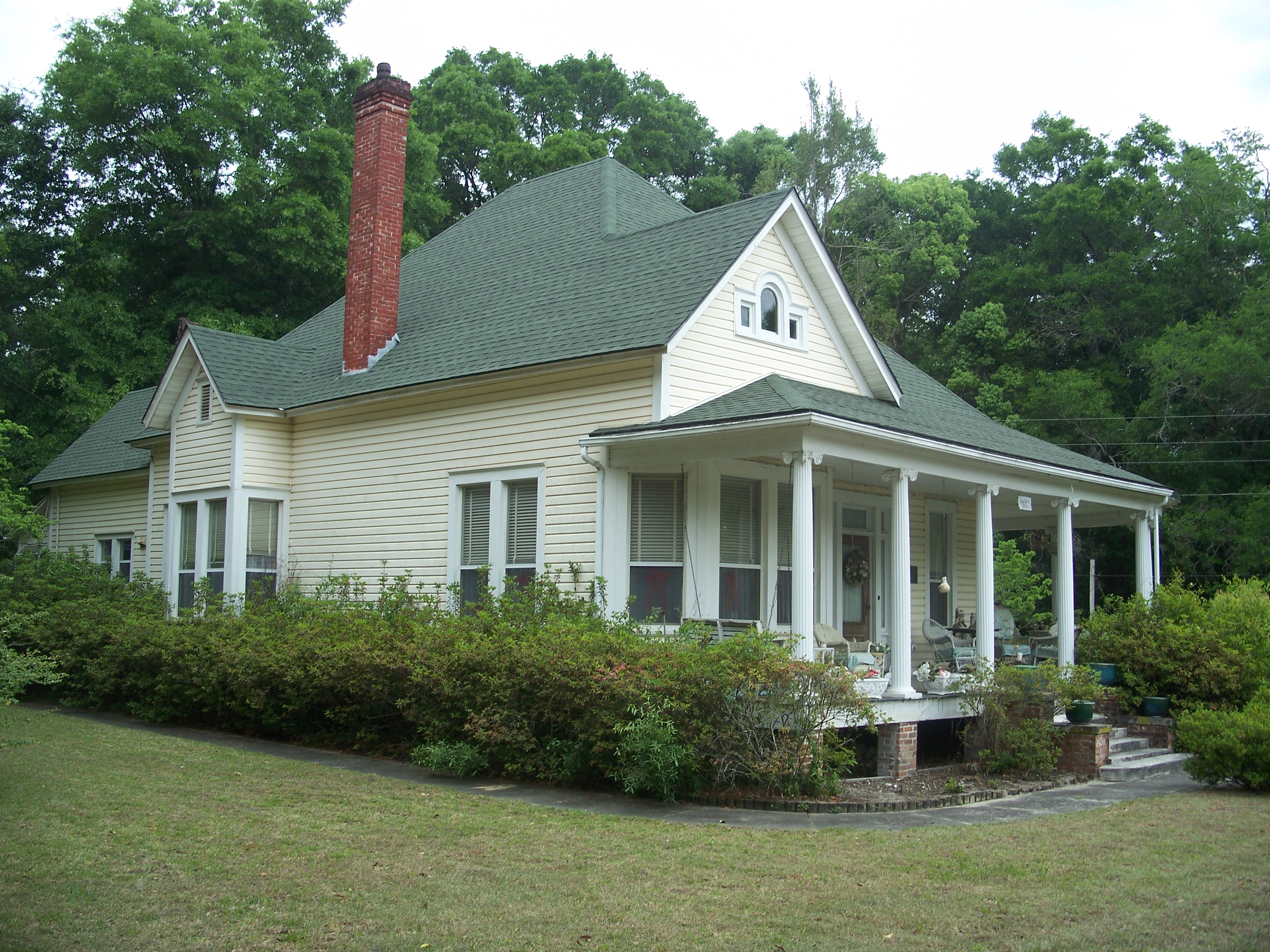
The Frosard W. Budington House

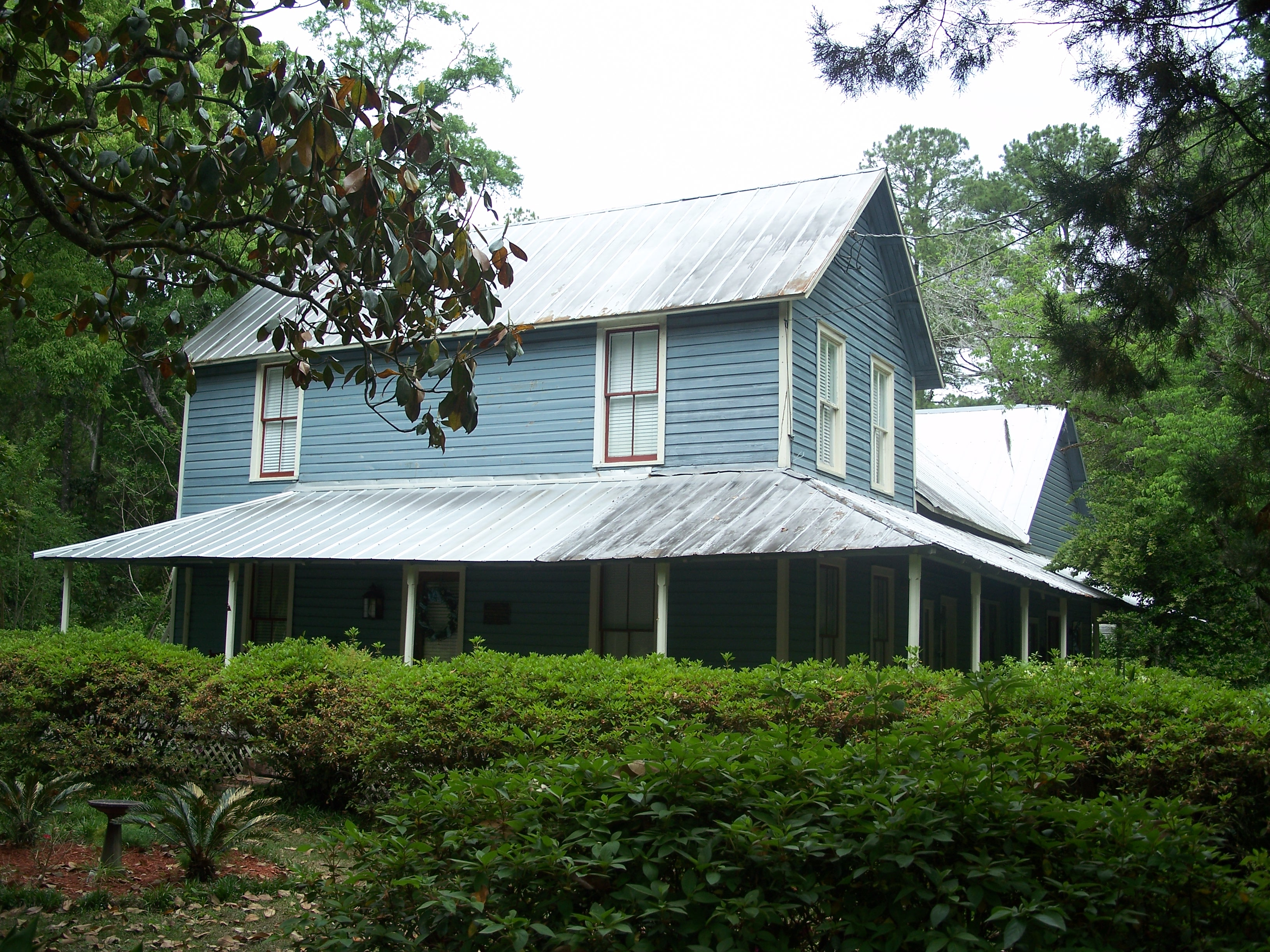
The Haskell-Long House

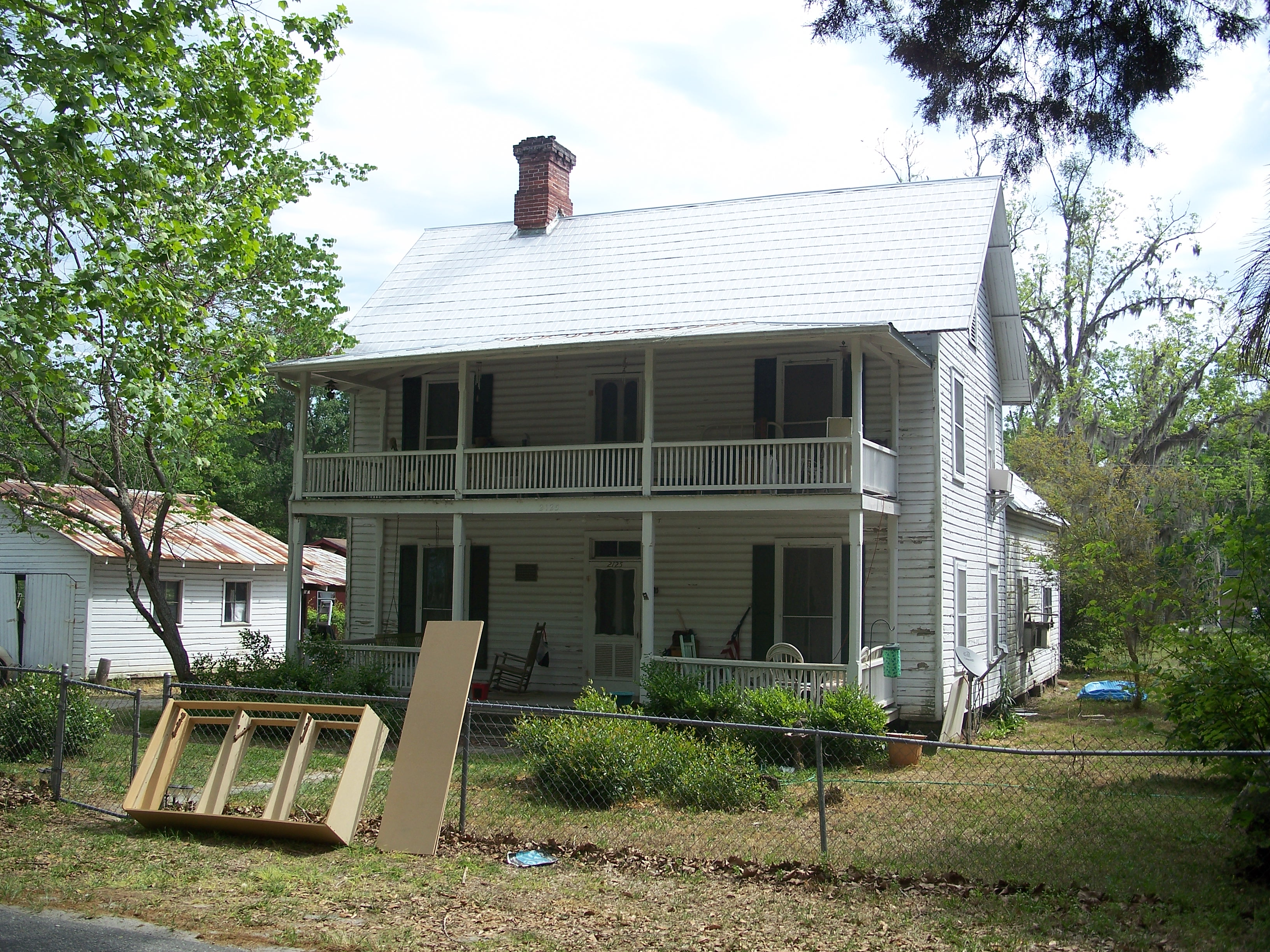
The George Randolph Frisbee Jr. House

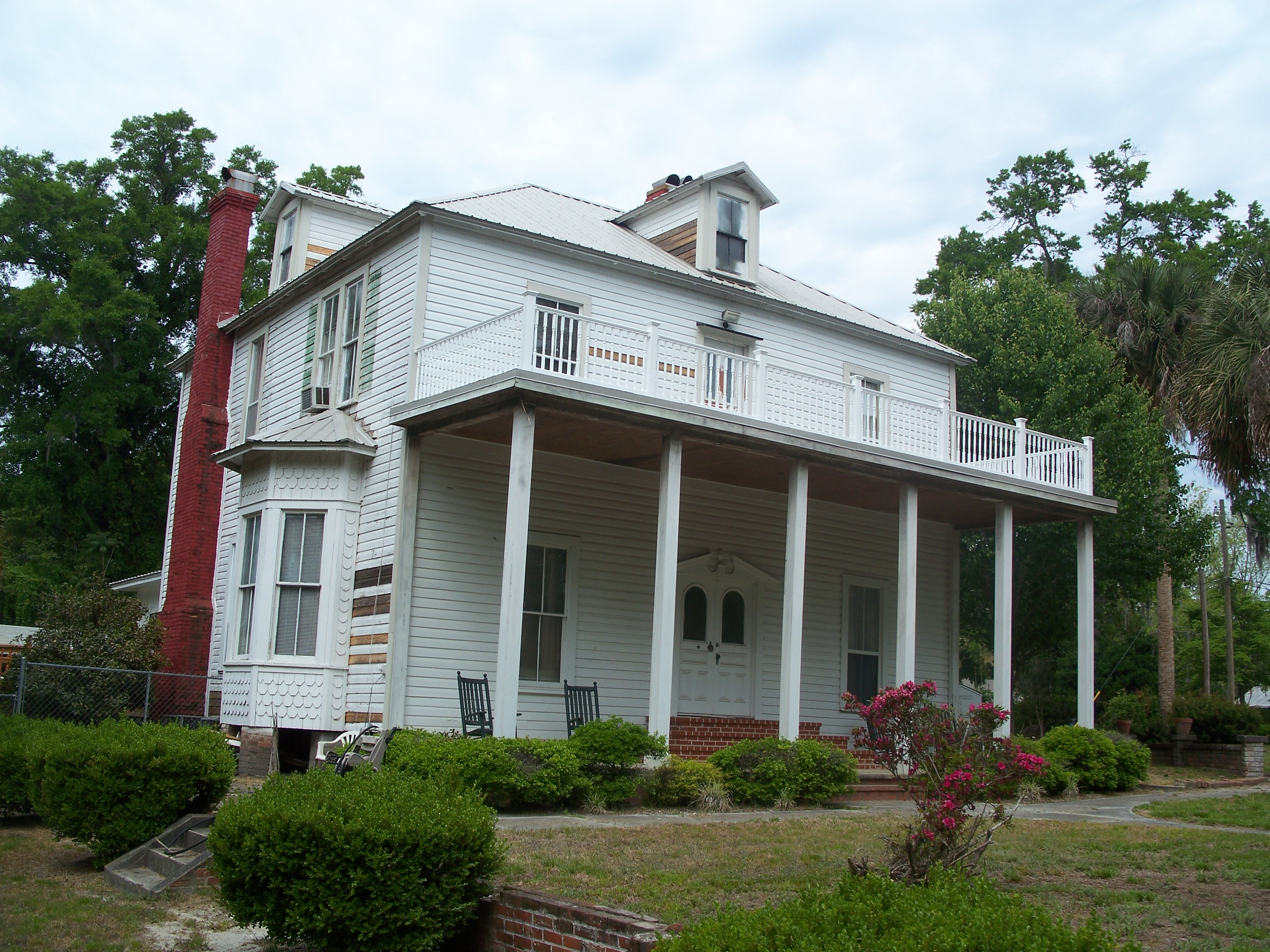
The "Edinfield" House is the only home located on Wharf Street

== History ==
=== Early nineteenth century and Antebellum era ===
The federal road was funded by the U.S. Congress in the early 1820s in an attempt to settle and develop the Florida Territory. Constructed between 1824–1827, the "military road" spanned from Colerain, Georgia to Tampa Bay, providing a route for the U.S. Military to access Forts Heileman and Sanderson during the Second Seminole War.

In connecting Colerain to Tampa, the federal road traversed the villages of Garey's Ferry and Whitesville, which were distinct settlements at the time; the former centered along the north fork of Black Creek and the latter along the south fork. Whitesville had a post office, and the federal road provided a postal route through the area; both villages consolidated into Middleburgh in 1851.

- Note: The Federal Road was one of several roads funded by the U.S. federal government within Florida in the 1820s and should not be confused with the Bellamy Road or a separate so-called "federal road" which connected Pensacola to Saint Augustine.

=== Whitesville ===
Before Middleburg was consolidated into its current town limits, the area comprised two distinct settlements upon each prong of Black Creek, within miles of each other. Garey's Ferry, located upon the North Prong of Black Creek, was situated upon Main Street, near the site of the former Fort Heilman, and currently the site of the Main Street Boat Ramp, Memorial Park, and the physical Historic District.

Situated on the South Prong of Black Creek was the settlement of Whitesville (briefly called "Webster"), which was begun by Ozias Budington, and was located south of the intersection of SR21 (Blanding Blvd.) and CR218, in what is today the Black Creek Park North neighborhood. No buildings from the original Whitesville settlement remain, but the Budington cemetery is located on private land on Halperns Way, while other named streets in the community (e.g. Whitesville Landing Court, Budington Drive) allude to the village that once existed there.

=== American Civil War ===
On October 23, 1864, during the American Civil War, the 4th Massachusetts Volunteer Cavalry engaged local Confederates in a skirmish from their base at the Magnolia Springs hotel. Moving into Middleburg the next day, October 24, 1864, the 4th Massachusetts raided and set fire to downtown Middleburg on Main Street and Thompson (now Wharf) Street, destroying Samuel B. Thompson's cotton warehouses and docks, as well as a hotel. The 2nd Florida Cavalry, under command of Captain J.J. Dickison, retaliated by firing on the Massachusetts regiment, leading the latter to retreat across Black Creek and burn the ferry bridge behind them. As the Massachusetts regiment rushed back to Magnolia Springs, Dickison's regiment detoured four miles through Whitesville and caught the Massachusetts regiment at Jeremiah Halsey's Plantation, engaging in a skirmish that resulted in twelve Union deaths and Confederate victory. This skirmish is known officially as the Battle of Halsey's Plantation, but has also been referred to as the Battle of Big Gum Creek. The exact location of Halsey's Plantation is not known, but it was near the site that is currently Shadowlawn Elementary School on County Road 218.

Among the repeated skirmishes between the 4th Massachusetts and 2nd Florida cavalries was a two-hour engagement whereby Dickison's troops rescued cattle that had been seized by Union troops, which local history refers to as the Battle of the Tiger Head.

=== Hill Top ===
Hill Top is another historic community located in the current limits of Middleburg, and is the site of Middleburg's historic black community. Hill Top was first settled by homesteaders, including Grant Forman (1868-1951), in the 1890s. Today, the community is situated around Forman Circle, and includes churches, homes, and a one-room schoolhouse According to "Embedded in Clay," Forman fled to South Carolina after his house was burned by a white mob. Frosard Budington, a leader of Whitesville, covered the cost of Forman's land taxes until such time as it was safe for Forman to return to Hill Top.

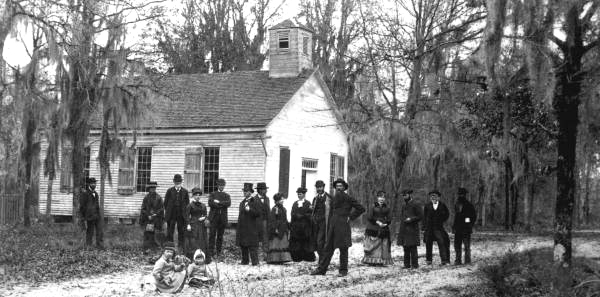
United Methodist Church in the 1880s.
