= Black Creek (Florida) =

River in Florida, United States of America

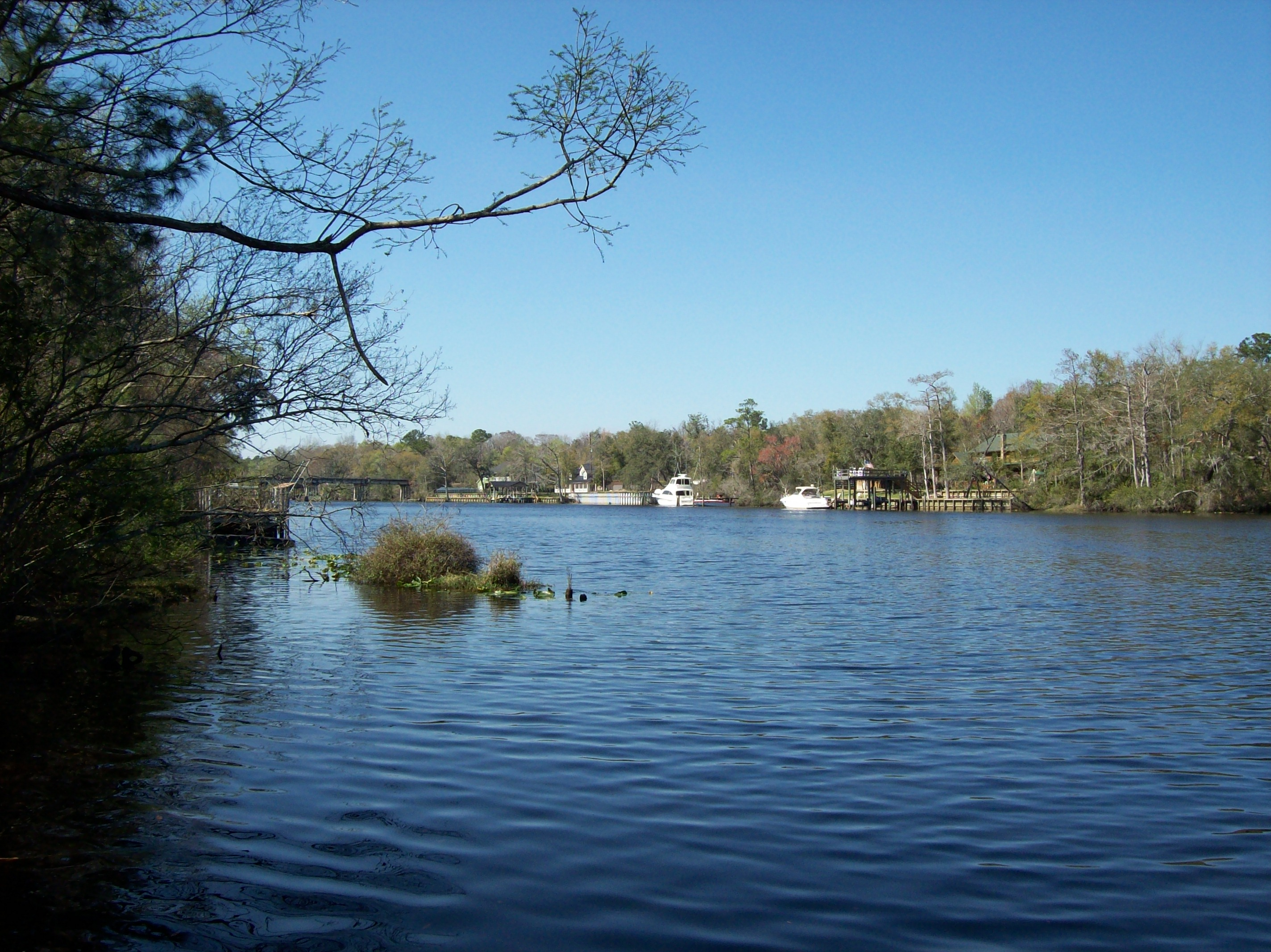
- Black Creek at Old Ferry Rd. Boat Ramp

Location
- Country: United States
- State: Florida
- County: Clay County, Duval County

Physical characteristics
- Source: Confluence of North Fork and South Fork
  - location: Middleburg
  - coordinates: 30.06885120°N 81.86037780°W
  - elevation: 33 feet (10 m)
- 2nd source: South Fork
  - location: Stevens Lake in Camp Blanding
  - coordinates: 29.89231482°N 82.00939680°W
  - elevation: 157 feet (48 m)
- 3rd source: North Fork
  - location: Kingsley Lake
  - coordinates: 29.96503202°N 81.99902458°W
  - elevation: 174 feet (53 m)
- Mouth
  - location: 3 miles (4.8 km) north of Green Cove Springs on the St. Johns River
  - coordinates: 30.04135220°N 81.70814890°W
  - elevation: Less than 5 feet (1.5 m)
- Basin size: 474 mi^{2} (1,230 km^{2})
- Discharge
  - average: 515 cu ft/s (14.6 m^{3}/s)

Black Creek is a tributary of the St. Johns River in Clay County, Florida. It is formed by the confluence of North Fork Black Creek and South Fork Black Creek. North Fork Black Creek originates as an outflow from Kingsley Lake and flows north and then southeast, meeting South Fork Black Creek on the east side of MIddleburg. North Fork Black Creek has Yellow Water Creek as its main tributary. South Fork Black Creek originates in a chain of lakes about four miles south of Kingsley Lake, with Ates Creek, Bull Creek, and Greens Creek as its main tributaries. Both forks are fed by areas of wetlands and numerous small streams.

== Black Creek basin ==
The Black Creek basin covers 474 square miles (1,230 km^{2}), including about two-thirds of Clay County. The western edge of the basin is the Trail Ridge, a sand ridge extending from northeastern Florida into southeastern Georgia. The northern 74 square miles (190 km^{2}) of the Black Creek watershed lies in Duval County. North Fork Black Creek and South Fork Black Creek both originate from lakes in the southwestern portion of the basin, about four miles apart. The average flow of Back Creek into the St. Johns River is 515 cu ft/s (14.6 m^{3}/s), of which about 44% is from South Fork, 39% is from North Fork, and the remaining 17% is from Peters Creek and other tributaries below the confluence of North Fork and South Fork.

The Black Creek Crayfish (Procambarus pictus) was once thought to be found only in upland streams in the Black Creek basin. It has since been found in a few neighboring stream basins.

=== Black Creek ===
The main stem of Black Creek from the confluence of the forks to its mouth on the St. Johns River is 13.0 miles (20.9 km) long. Peter's Creek joins Black Creek just before its mouth. Black Creek flows into the St. Johns River 3 miles (4.8 km) north of Green Cove Springs.

The St. Johns River Water Management District has established the Black Creek Ravines Conservation Area along 2.7 miles (4.3 km) of the south side of Black Creek from just above where North Fork Black Creek and South Fork Black Creek join.

=== North Fork Black Creek ===
North Fork Black Creek arises as the outflow from Kingsley Lake. It runs 14 miles (23 km) northward and then turns to the southeast flowing through Jennings State Forest to its confluence with South Fork Black Creek near Middleburg. Its primary tributary is Yellow Water Creek, which arises in swamps in Duval County, flowing south to meet North Fork Black Creek in Jennings State Forest.

The North Fork passes the Main Street Boat Ramp, and the approximate location of Forts Heileman and Sanderson.

=== South Fork Black Creek ===
South Fork Black Creek arises in three lakes in Camp Blanding, starting as the outflow from Stevens Lake and passing through Whitmore Lake and Varnes Lake. It flows generally northeastward, then west of north until turning northeastward again shortly before joining North Fork Black Creek near Middleburg. The stream has three primary tributaries; Ates Creek, Bull Creek, and Greens Creek.

== Water color and quality ==
Black Creek is a blackwater stream. The streams in the Black Creek basin carry 30 to as much as 336 parts-per-million (ppm) of dissolved substances. The color of North Fork Black Creek water ranges as high as 240 (on a scale of 0–500) units on the Platinum-Cobalt scale. Hardness, pH, and particularly, color and iron content make the water from Black Creek objectionable to most users.

== Historical river port ==
The Alachua Trail was an ancient Native American trail that ran from the Altamaha River in Georgia to south of the Alachua Prairie, a primary route from the Southeastern United States into north central Florida during the Second Spanish and Florida territorial periods. Another ancient trail branched from the Alachua Trail southwest of Kingsley Lake, passing south of the lake to Middleburg and Black Creek. The Black Creek route offered the settlers around the Alachua Prairie a shorter alternative to access water-borne commerce than the original route to the St. Mary's River. Steamboats plying the St. Johns River made regular stops at Black Creek in the 1830s and 1840s.

In 1826, a military road was established between Coleraine, Georgia, on the St. Marys River and Tampa Bay. The road followed Black Creek Trail from its juncture with the Alachua Trail, crossing Black Creek where the North and South forks joined, and then proceeding to a juncture with the King's Road northeast of what is now Jacksonville. The town of Middleburg grew up where the road crossed Black Creek. During the Second Seminole War Fort Heileman was established there. Cotton and other agricultural produce from the Alachua Prairie area was carried over the Black Creek Trail to Middleburg, which became an important cotton-shipping port between the Second Seminole War and the Civil War. Middleburg eventually lost its monopoly on trade with the Alachua Prairie area. A wagon road was opened in the 1830s between Micanopy, on the south edge of the Alachua Prairie, and St. Augustine, crossing the St. Johns River via the Alachua Ferry. The Florida Railroad, starting from Fernandina, reached Alachua County in 1860, capturing the Cotton shipments that had previously gone to Middleburg.

== Black Creek Water Resource Development Project ==
The Black Creek Water Resource Development Project is planned to pump water from a point on the South Fork Black Creek out of the Black Creek Basin to feed into Alligator Creek in southwestern Clay County. Alligator Creek flows into Lake Brooklyn, adjacent to Keystone Heights. The project is intended to raise the water level in Lake Brooklyn and replenish the Upper Floridian aquifer. The State of Florida appropriated almost $43.4 million for the project in 2017. The St. Johns River Water Management District is providing another $5 million for the project. Up to 10 million US gallons (38 Ml) a day will be captured at an intake station where Florida State Road 16 crosses the South Fork west of Penney Farms. Water will be diverted from South Fork only when the stream flow is at or above average. The diverted water will be pumped through a pipeline running along State Road 16 west to the junction with Florida State Road 21, and then south along State Road 21 until it reaches Alligator Creek.

The project was delayed when the US Environmental Protection Agency raised questions about the effects of adding dark water from the Black Creek basin to the clear water of Lake Brooklyn. The District implemented a pilot project in March, 2021 to test filtering the Black Creek water through a man-made wetland. A consultant estimated that a full-scale wetland filter might cost $15 million to construct.

== Bridges ==
Two major highways cross Black Creek: State Road 21 crosses North Fork Black Creek at Middleburg and U.S. Route 17 near the mouth of Black Creek at the St. Johns River. State Road 16 crosses North Fork Black Creek just below its outflow from Kingsley Lake, and crosses South Fork Black Creek east of Penney Farms. County Road 218 also crosses South Fork Black Creek at Middleburg just .1 miles (0.16 km) east of State Road 21 or as it is more commonly known Blanding Blvd. and again crosses North Fork Black Creek 8.2 miles west of Blanding Blvd., northwest of the south entrance to Jennings State Forest.

== Restrictions ==
Portions of North Fork Black Creek, South Fork Black Creek, Peters Creek, and areas around boat ramps on the lower Black Creek, are designated "slow speed/minimum wake" zones. Portions of North Fork Black Creek and South Fork Black Creek are also closed to water skiing.
