= Clark–Chalker House =

Historic house in Florida, United States

- U.S. National Register of Historic Places
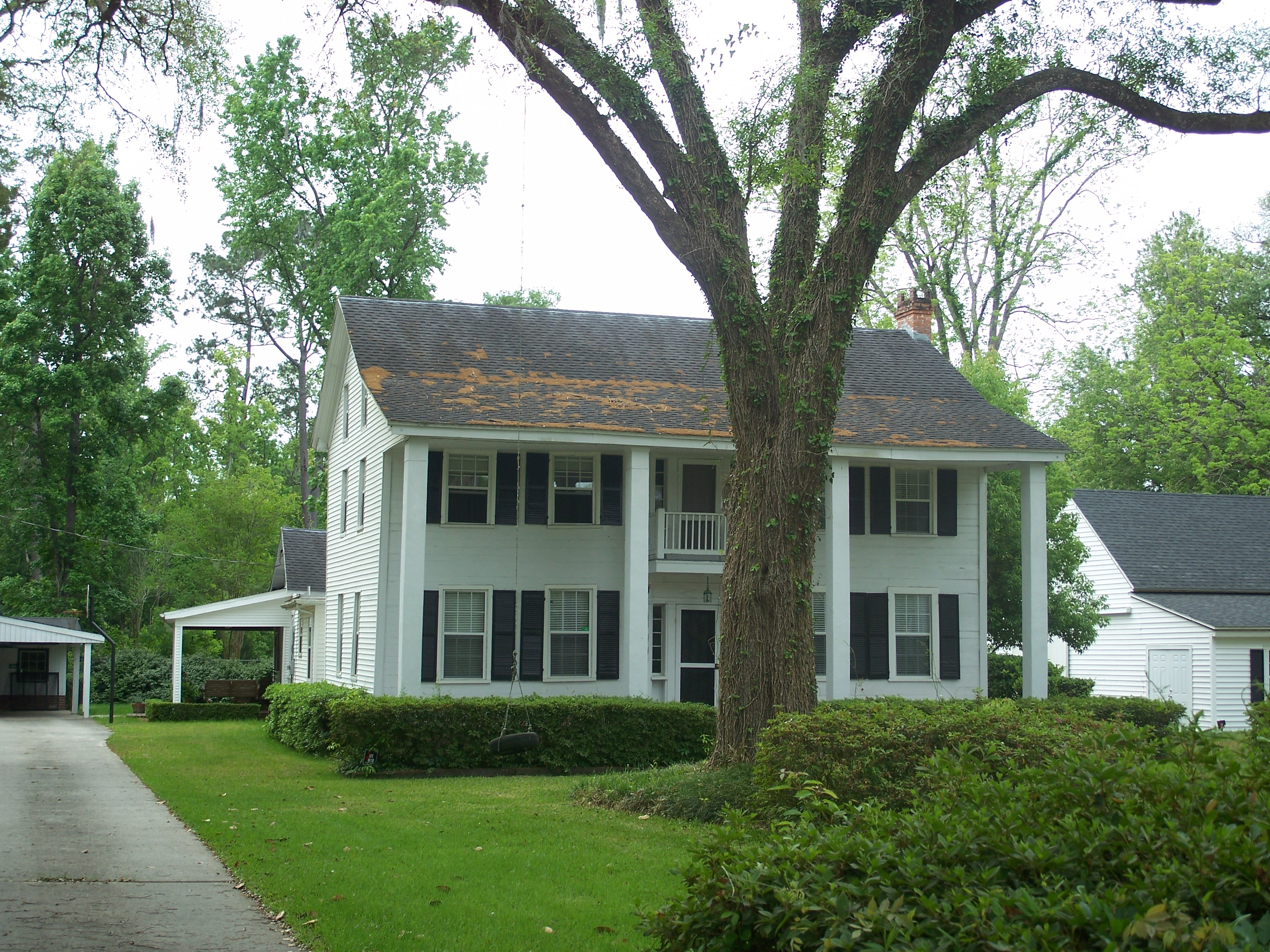

- Location within Florida Location within the United States
- Location: Middleburg, Florida
- Coordinates: 30°4′7″N 81°51′37″W
- Built: 1835
- Architectural style: Colonial Revival
- NRHP reference No.: 88001701
- Added to NRHP: October 5, 1988

The ‘’‘Clark–Chalker House’’’ is a historic house in Middleburg, Florida, located within the Middleburg Historic District. The house was listed on the National Register of Historic Places on October 5, 1988. It is a two-and-a-half-story frame vernacular house constructed primarily of hand-hewn pine and is notable as one of the early surviving houses associated with the development of Middleburg."National Register of Historic Places Registration Form: Clark-Chalker House". National Park Service. June 29, 1988.

== History ==
The house stands in the area historically known as Garey’s Ferry on Black Creek. Middleburg developed as a transportation center because Black Creek was navigable to the forks and connected the interior with the St. Johns River. By 1835, the area was known as Black Creek or Garey’s Ferry, and the settlement subsequently became an important military and commercial center.

Local tradition attributes the construction of the house to Captain Michael M. Clark, a Virginia-born quartermaster associated with Fort Heileman, a military depot established at Garey’s Ferry during the Second Seminole War. The National Register nomination, however, notes that surviving Army records do not confirm that the house was constructed in 1835. The records do show that Clark received instructions from Washington to construct buildings and that his accounts document substantial expenditures for construction.

The house may have been associated with Fort Heileman during the Second Seminole War. The National Register nomination records local tradition that the house may have served as a military hospital and notes that a 1845 deed described the property as including the “old Army hospital.” The nomination also records the possibility that stars carved into the house’s facade may have identified it as a headquarters used by Generals Winfield Scott and Thomas Jesup during their stays at Fort Heileman, although this interpretation is not established as fact.

In 1845, Isaac Varnes purchased the property. The deed described the property as including the house on Main Street and the “old Army hospital.” William Sims Bardin acquired the property in 1859 and subsequently gave the house to his daughter Martha Anne and her husband, Albert Symington Chalker. The Chalker family remained associated with the house for much of the remainder of the 19th century and into the 20th century.

The house underwent several alterations during the late 19th and 20th centuries. Among the most significant were rear additions made in the 1890s and alterations to the front porch and facade made by Dr. Francis Allen Copp in 1936. Despite these changes, much of the original hand-hewn framing and other early construction material survives.

== Architecture ==
The house is a two-and-a-half-story frame vernacular building resting on brick piers. The original central portion was approximately 26 feet wide by 40 feet long and was constructed of hand-hewn heart pine. Its original facade featured a five-bay arrangement with an incised porch and upper gallery. The National Register nomination classifies the building as having no formal architectural style, with French Colonial characteristics.

== National Register of Historic Places ==
The Clark–Chalker House was listed in the National Register on October 5, 1988, under Criterion A for its association with the exploration and settlement and social history of Middleburg. The nomination identifies the house as one of the original houses of Middleburg and notes its association with two pioneer families for nearly a century.
