= George Randolph Frisbee Jr. House =

Historic house in Florida, United States

- U.S. National Register of Historic Places
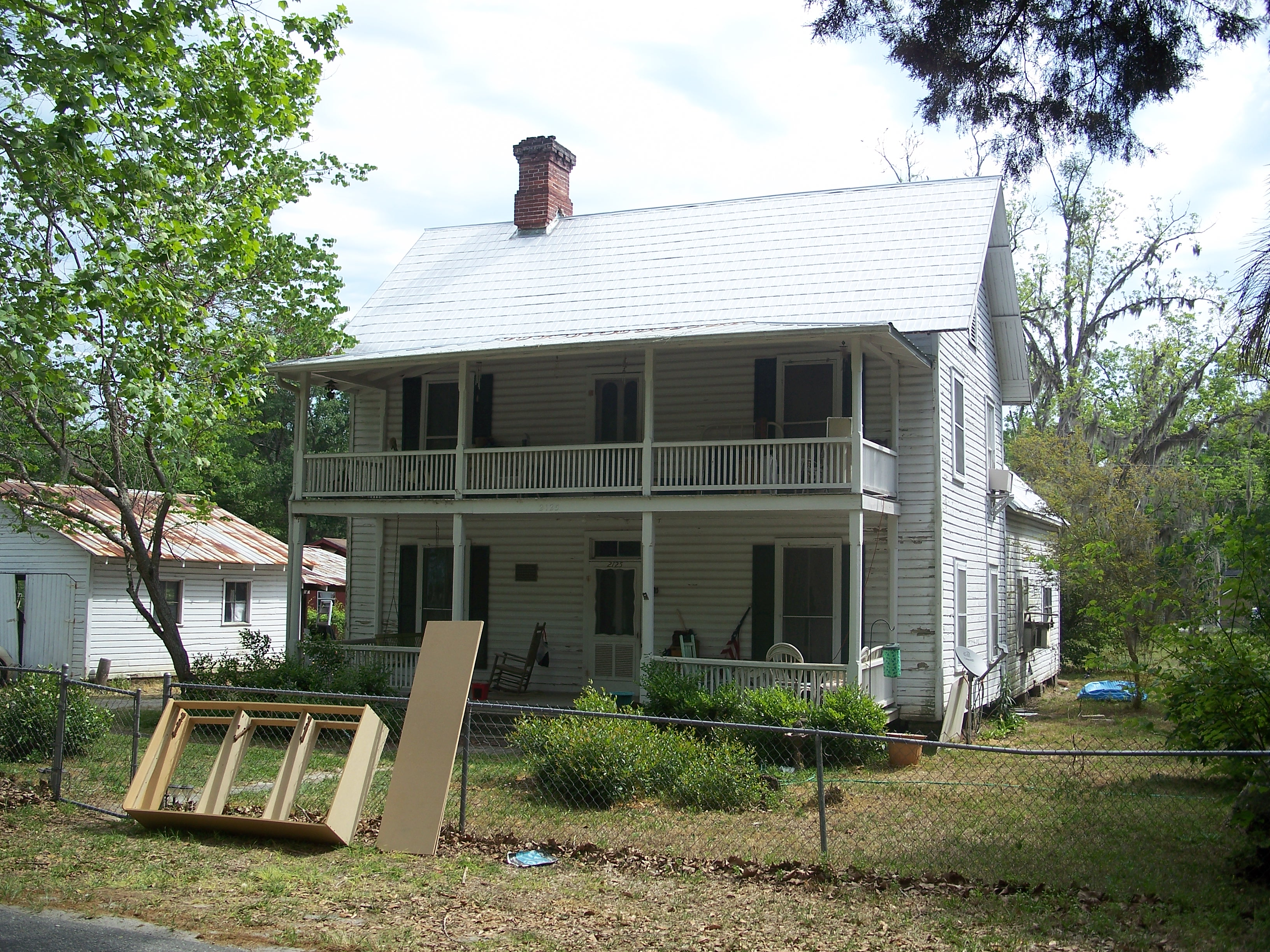

- Location within Florida
- Location: Middleburg, Florida
- Coordinates: 30°4′12″N 81°51′40″W
- Built: 1890
- Architectural style: Frame Vernacular
- MPS: Middleburg MPS
- NRHP reference No.: 90000316
- Added to NRHP: March 9, 1990

The George Randolph Frisbee Jr. House is a historic house located within the Middleburg Historic District at 2125 Palmetto Street in Middleburg, Florida.

Built in 1890, the Frisbee House is locally significant as an example of late 19th century vernacular building trends and also as one of the few buildings dating from the early developmental period of the community.

== Description ==
The Frisbee House was constructed in 1890, and is a two-story, Frame Vernacular building, with an L-shaped floor plan. It has a steeply pitched, side gabled roof. The symmetrical main facade is dominated by a two-story, hip roofed porch with chamfered post supports and a balustrade. There is a rear gabled, one-story ell, and a two-story shed roofed addition on the rear elevation. It was added to the National Register of Historic Places on March 9, 1990.

== History ==
The Frisbee House is located at 2125 Palmetto Street and was located along the federal road, which provided a military and postal route connecting Garey's Ferry (as the village on the north fork of Black Creek was then called) and the neighboring village of Whitesville, located along the south fork of Black Creek.

Whitesville was the site of a United States Post Office location in the 1840s, but in December 1858, the villages consolidated into Middleburgh, and the Post Office was subsequently moved to its present location on Palmetto Street, neighboring the Frisbee House and adjacent to the site where Ozias Budington operated a general store.

Following the American Civil War, Middleburgh's population decreased significantly.
