= George A. Chalker House =

Historic house in Florida, United States

- U.S. National Register of Historic Places
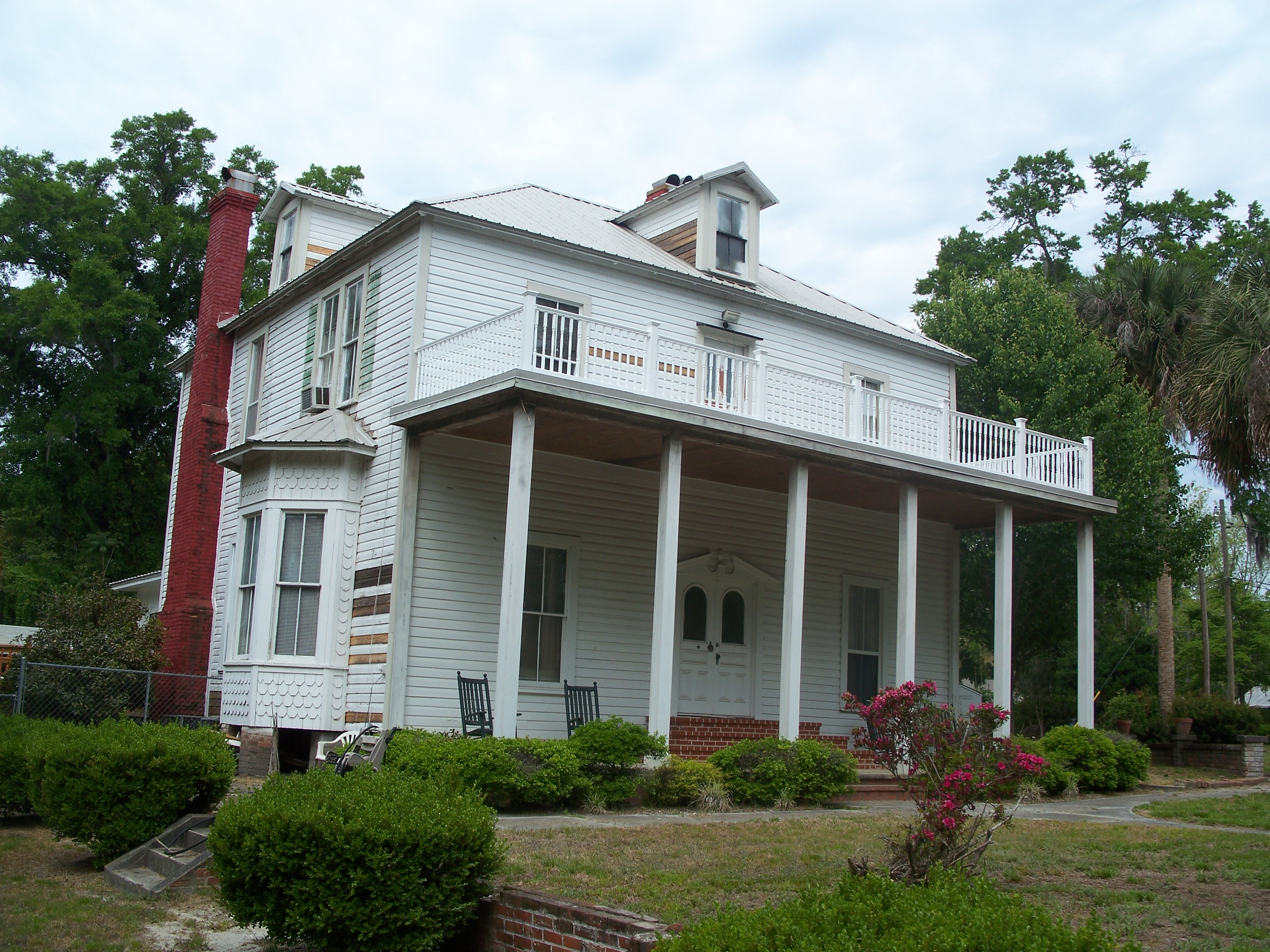

- Location within Florida Location within the United States
- Location: 2160 Wharf St., Middleburg, Florida
- Coordinates: 30°4′3″N 81°51′37″W
- Area: 1.0 acre (0.40 ha)
- Built: c. 1897
- Architectural style: Colonial Revival
- MPS: Middleburg MPS
- NRHP reference No.: 90000315
- Added to NRHP: March 9, 1990

The George A. Chalker House (also known as the Edenfield House) is a historic house in the Middleburg Historic District, Middleburg, Florida. Located at 2160 Wharf Street, the Edenfield House is the only historic home in the district to not be located on Main Street.

Built around 1897, it was originally designed in the Folk Victorian style, but was later remodeled to fit the Colonial Revival style that was popular in the early 1900s.

In 1990, it was added to the U.S. National Register of Historic Places.
