= Haskell-Long House =

Historic house in Florida, United States

- U.S. National Register of Historic Places
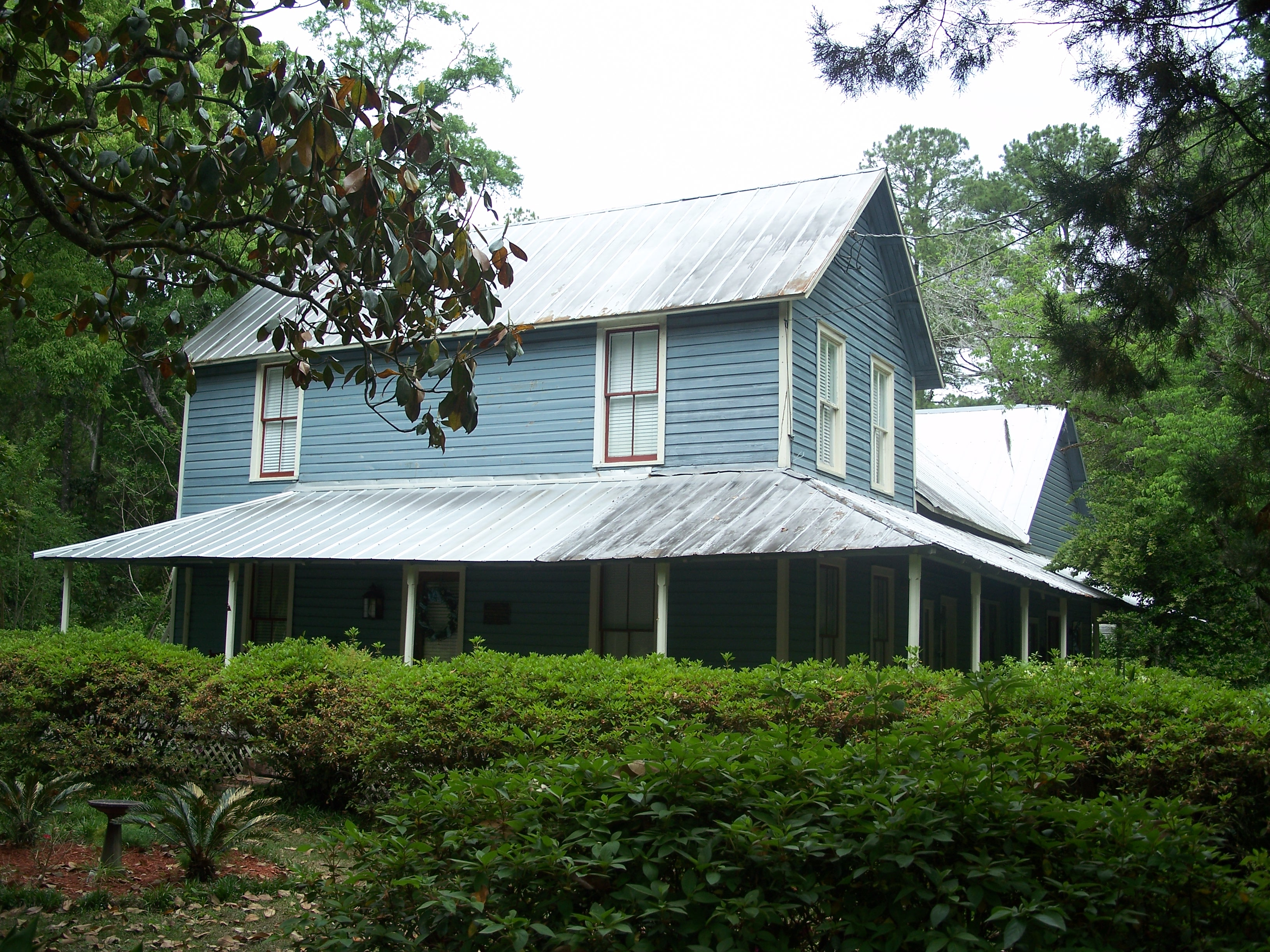

- Location within Florida Location within the United States
- Location: Middleburg, Florida
- Coordinates: 30°4′14″N 81°51′29″W
- Built: c. 1890
- Architect: Ferdinand L. Haskell
- Architectural style: Frame Vernacular
- MPS: Middleburg MPS
- NRHP reference No.: 90000314
- Added to NRHP: March 9, 1990

The Haskell-Long House is a historic house located at 3858 Main Street in Middleburg, Florida.

== Description and history ==
The Haskell-Long was added to the National Register of Historic Places on March 9, 1990.

The Haskell-Long House has a central position on Main Street and within the Middleburg Historic District); Main Street was once the "federal road" (constructed circa 1825–1826), which connected Coleraine, Georgia to Tampa, Florida. Likewise, the house was in the vicinity of the unknown locations of Forts Heileman and Sanderson, the exactly locations of which are subject to debate per historian Cynthia Stone, PhD. During the Second Seminole War, Fort Heileman was hastily constructed in 1835, and nearby Fort Sanderson (built July 1840) was used for storage. Both structures were abandoned in 1841, and completely destroyed in a hurricane in 1842.
