= Frosard W. Budington House =

Historic house in Florida, United States

- U.S. National Register of Historic Places
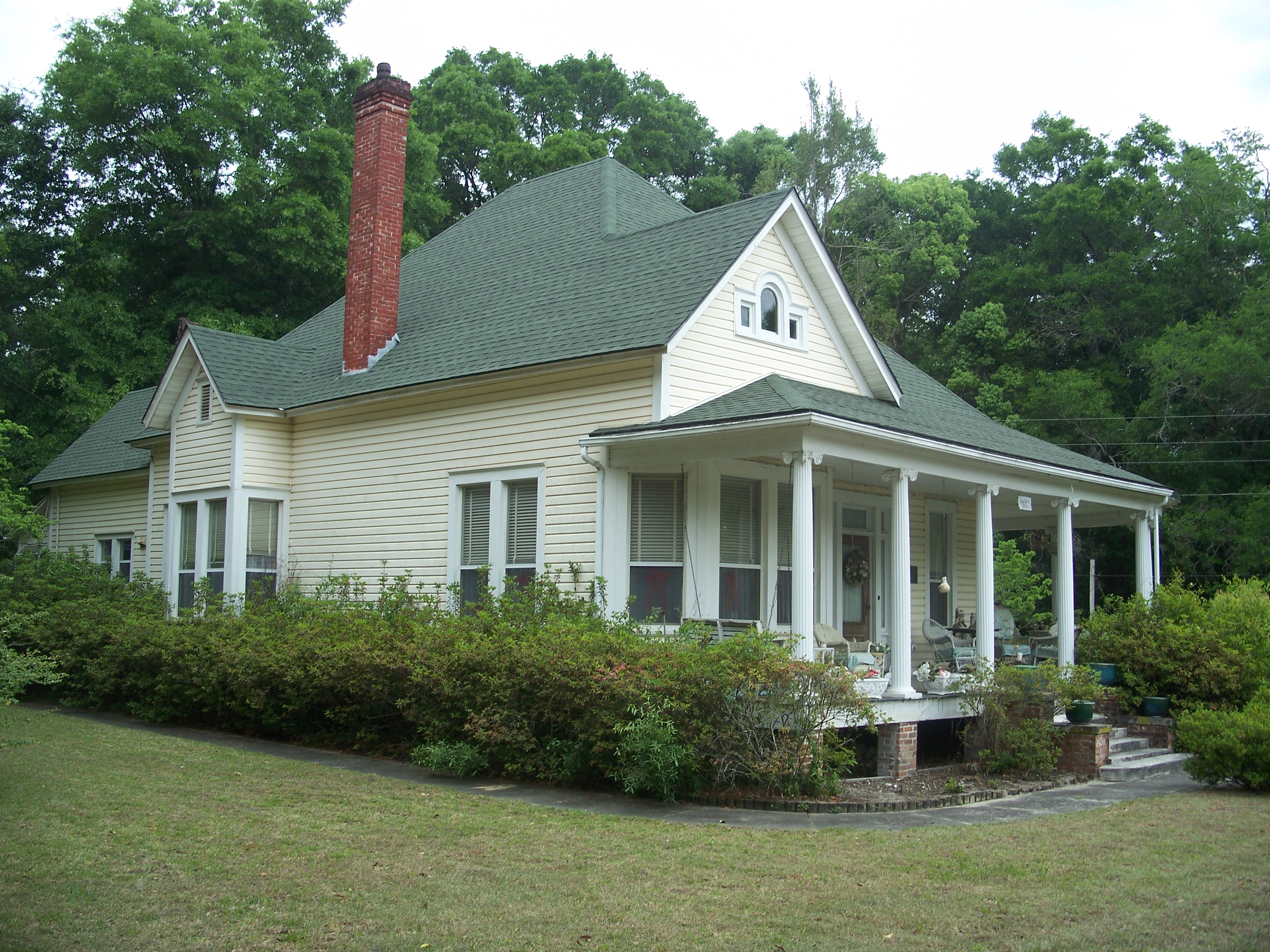

- Location within Florida Location within the United States
- Location: 3916 Main St., Middleburg, Florida
- Coordinates: 30°04′08″N 81°51′45″W
- Area: 1 acre (0.40 ha)
- Built: 1910
- Architectural style: Queen Anne
- MPS: Middleburg MPS
- NRHP reference No.: 90000317
- Added to NRHP: March 9, 1990

The Frosard W. Budington House is a historic home located in the Middleburg Historic District in Middleburg, Florida. It is located at 3916 Main Street. On March 9, 1990, it was added to the U.S. National Register of Historic Places.

It is a one-story Queen Anne-style house built in 1910.
