= Middleburg United Methodist Church =

Historic church in Florida, United States

- Black Creek Methodist Church
- U.S. National Register of Historic Places
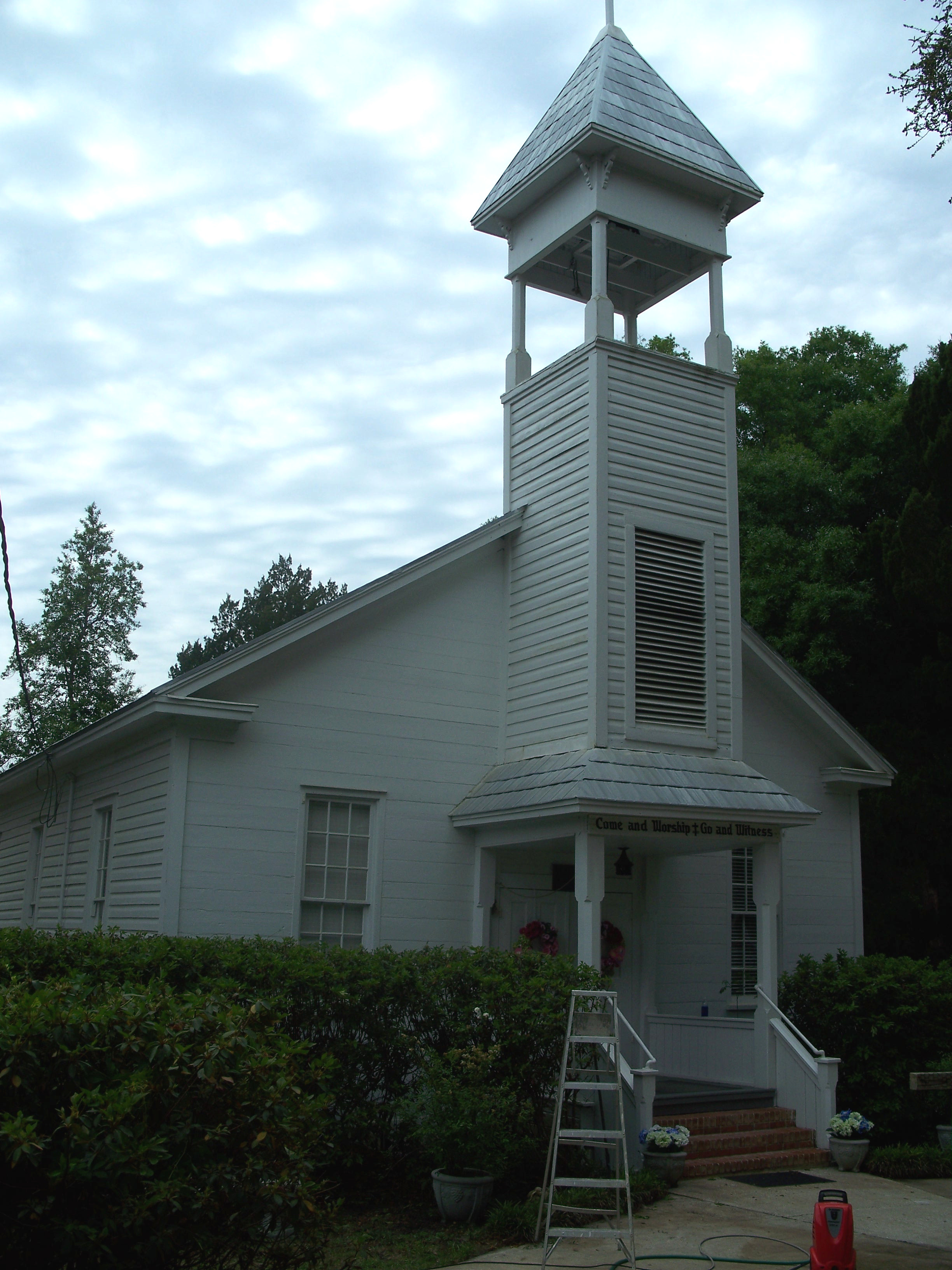

- Location within Florida Location within the United States
- Location: 3925 Main Street, Middleburg, Florida
- Coordinates: 30°4′4″N 81°51′46″W
- MPS: Middleburg MPS
- NRHP reference No.: 90000318
- Added to NRHP: March 9, 1990

The Black Creek Methodist Church, formerly known as the Methodist Episcopal Church at Black Creek and Middleburg United Methodist Church, is an historic church in Middleburg, Florida, United States. On March 9, 1990, it was added to the US National Register of Historic Places.

Black Creek Methodist Church, was organized in 1823. Families first met in each other's homes and their pastor was a circuit rider. He came by horseback and visited every month or so depending on his circuit, the weather, and the Indians.

The property where the historic church now stands was deeded in 1847 by John Schuefler. George Branning donated the lumber and the labor. The church has wide clapboards on the exterior and wide random-width tongue and groove boards on the inside. Nails were made by hand at a local blacksmith shop and can still be seen in the pews. The pews are mahogany and were finished by hand with a drawknife. Mahogany is not a native wood so it was brought in by steamboat. The bell, hanging in the steeple was cast in 1852 and purchased in New York by George Branning. Its first official tolling was the death of George Branning's son.

Early service at 8:30 is still held in the Historic Church, making it the oldest continuous used Methodist Church in Florida.

Other parcels of land were donated or purchased through the years. The Budington Building, a hospital ward from Camp Blanding, was donated by the Budingtons in 1951. The Sanctuary was completed in 1983 and the Family Life Center in 2004.

== Current functions ==
Black Creek Methodist Church is a Global Methodist congregation located in Middleburg, Florida, that serves local residents and maintains the traditions established by past generations of church members who saw the need for a house of worship.

The church mission is "to be a point of light in the community, focused on loving God, developing disciples of Jesus Christ and spreading Scriptural holiness".

Black Creek Methodist Church has a commitment to community missions. They have a Food Ministry providing food to between 250 to 300 families per week as of 2023 and a Clothes Ministry. They provide space for the community's groups, as well as for the local Spanish church.

The church disaffiliated from the Florida Annual Conference of the United Methodist Church as of July 1, 2023.

== See also ==
- National Register of Historic Places listings in Florida
