= Treaty of Colerain =

1796 treaty between the United States and Creek

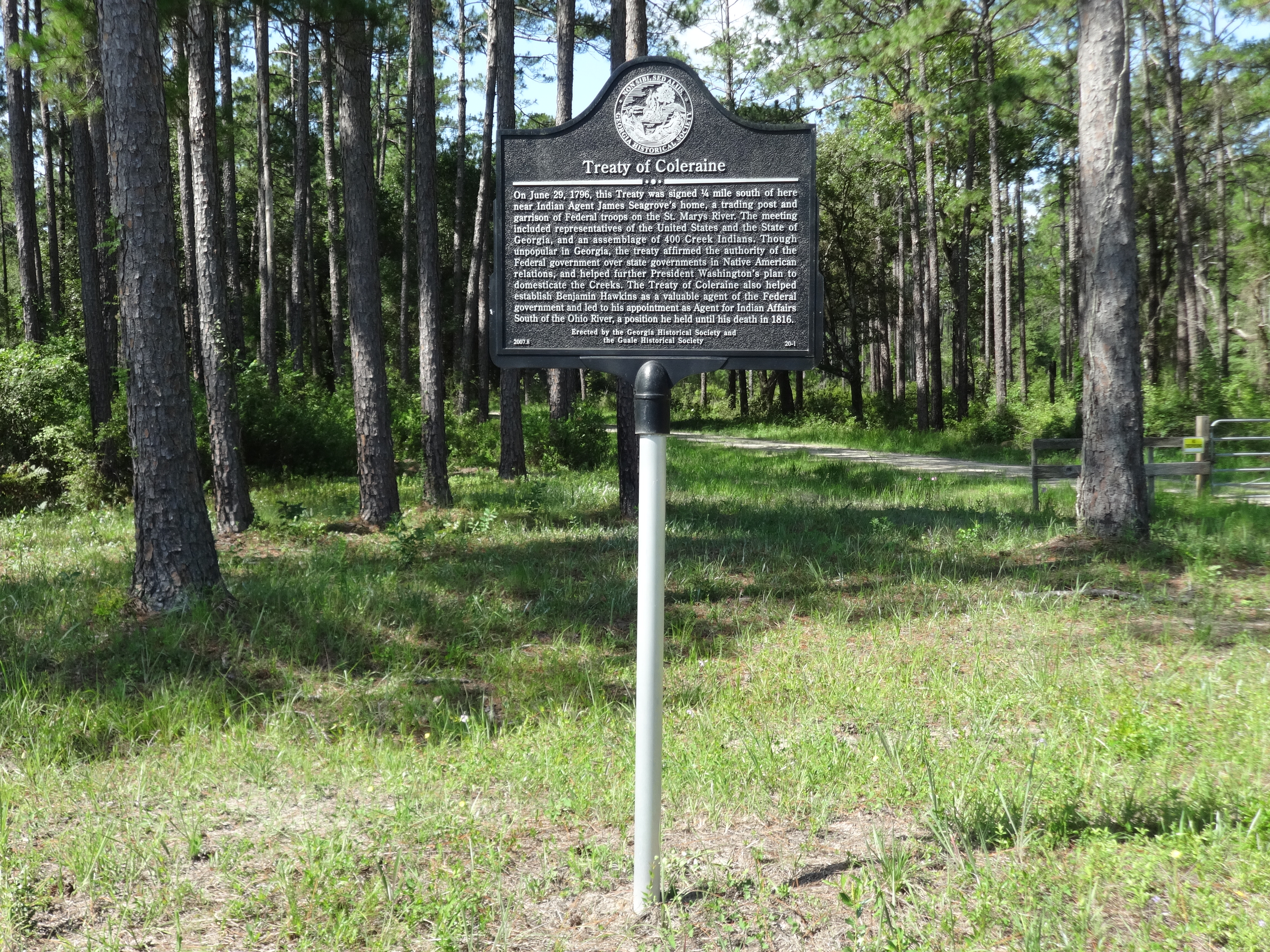
Treaty of Coleraine historical marker on Georgia State Route 40.

The Treaty of Colerain was signed at St. Marys, Georgia in Camden County, Georgia, by Benjamin Hawkins, George Clymer, and Andrew Pickens for the United States and representatives of the Creek Nation, for whom Indian trader Langley Bryant served as an interpreter, on June 29, 1796, proclaimed on March 18, 1797, and codified as 7 Stat. 56. Colerain was a small community and the site of a U.S. Indian factory founded by James Seagrove.

This treaty affirmed the binding of the Treaty of New York (1790). The Treaties of Hopewell and the Treaty of Holston (1791) established boundary lines between the Choctaws, Chickasaws, Cherokee, and the U.S. The Treaty of Colerain bound the Creek Nation to acknowledge the boundaries established in those treaties.

It also established the boundary line between the Creek Nation and the United States. At the time of this treaty, the boundaries between Spanish Florida and the U.S. had not yet been established. This treaty formally allowed the Creek chiefs to acknowledge the negotiation for delineating the Georgia-Florida boundary with Spain.

The treaty contained a provision that the President of the U.S. may establish a trading or military outpost.

The United States demanded that the Creeks give up their American prisoners and also return all "citizens, white inhabitants, negroes and property" taken by the Creeks.

The treaty describes when it would take effect. After the treaty had been signed but not yet promulgated, the U.S. Senate requested modification of two articles of the treaty. The first modification stipulated that the military or trading posts would be under the control of the United States. The second modification stipulated that if the U.S. no longer required the use of those posts, the locations would revert to the Creek people.

== See also ==
- List of United States treaties
