= James Seagrove =

American politician

James Seagrove was an ambassador for the United States to the Creek Nation and merchant who lived in southern Georgia.

== Early career as a merchant and trader ==
Although Seagrove's early life is obscure, he was probably born in southern Ireland in 1767. He first appears helping the states of Georgia and South Carolina to procure supplies from Cuba during the American Revolutionary War.

After the war, Seagrove moved to Camden County, Georgia. During the 1780s, acting occasionally with the British firm of Panton, Leslie & Company, Seagrove developed a network of mercantile and diplomatic contacts with the Spanish and the Indians along the Georgia borders, and both the state and the federal government utilized his talents in a series of missions to the southern tribes.

Early on, he purchased land and ran a store on Point Peter. Seagrove was one of twenty men who created the town of St. Marys, on the St. Marys River, in 1787. He also formed a charter with his brother Robert Seagrove, and James Armstrong and Noble Hardee for the town of Coleraine also on the St. Marys River, where he operated a mercantile store. He received permission to trade with the Lower Creeks from Chief Alexander McGillivray.

== Public service on the Georgia-Florida frontier ==
In 1787, Seagrove was elected to the Georgia House of Representatives. In 1788, Seagrove and Henry Osborne, also of Camden County, were candidates for Representative to the First United States Congress of 1789. Both Seagrove and Osborne lost to Abraham Baldwin.

In 1789, Seagrove was appointed a Collector of the State of Georgia under Congress, an appointment for which he wrote to George Washington for support. The post was at St. Marys, and the town became the site of a U.S. Customs Port. Dissatisfied with an appointment which had produced "not one shilling," Seagrove wrote to President Washington on 16 April 1790 requesting a more lucrative assignment and in March 1792 he was made inspector of the port.

He also served as a Commissioner to the Spanish government in Florida, going to St. Augustine in 1791 to discuss fugitive slaves from the United States entering East Florida.

In 1793, Seagrove undertook a mission to Tukabatchee, a 'capital' town of the Creek Nation.

In 1796, the Treaty of Colerain between the Creeks and United States was signed at the small town Seagrove had founded.

James Seagrove's death date cannot be found, but it is known he was a participant in the Patriot Expedition in 1811.
