= Andrew Pickens =

Andrew Pickens may refer to:

- Andrew Pickens (congressman) (1739–1817), American revolutionary soldier and US Congressman, South Carolina
- Andrew Pickens (governor) (1779–1838), War of 1812 and Governor of South Carolina
- Andrew C. Pickens, US Navy admiral during World War II on USS Wichita (CA-45)
