= Kingsley Lake =

Lake in Florida, United States

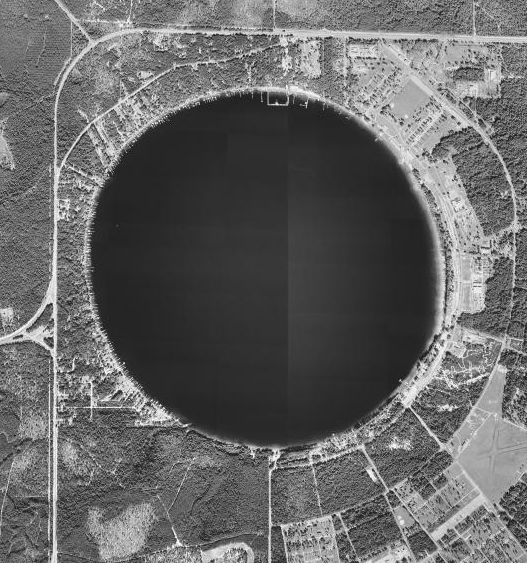

- Location within Florida Location within the United States
- Location: Clay County, Florida, United States
- Coordinates: 29°57′53″N 081°59′53″W
- Basin countries: United States
- Surface area: 2,000 acres (810 ha)
- Max. depth: approx. 100 ft (30 m)
- Surface elevation: 174 ft (53 m)

Kingsley Lake is an almost perfectly circular lake of about 2,000 acres (810 ha) in North East Florida, located inside Clay County about six miles (9.7 km) east of Starke, Florida. According to some sources, it is the oldest and highest lake in Florida, located on the edge of the Trail Ridge formation. The lake is a very stable lake with a sandy bottom. Its deepest point is about 100 feet (30 m) inside of a steep sinkhole within the lake. Kingsley Lake is so nearly circular that pilots call it the "silver dollar lake". There are around 180 docks around the lake, mostly around the western half of the lake encompassing the small community of the same name. Camp Blanding is on the eastern side of the lake as part of the Florida National Guard, as well as a small airstrip just to the southeast of the lake as part of Camp Blanding. The lake is about 30 miles northeast of Gainesville, 30 miles southwest of Jacksonville, and 30 miles northwest of Palatka.

== Geological formation ==
The lake is thought to have formed as a sinkhole.

== See also ==
- List of sinkholes of the United States
