= Colerain, Georgia =

Historic site and extinct town in Camden County, Georgia

Colerain Coleraine, Colrane
- Ghost town, extinct town
- Location within Camden County, Georgia, United States
- Coordinates: 30°49′59″N 81°54′02″W
- Country: United States
- State: Georgia
- County: Camden

Colerain (also spelled Coleraine and Colrane) is a historic site and extinct settlement in Camden County, Georgia. The Geographic Names Information System classifies Colerain as a populated place. The settlement developed around a trading post on the St. Marys River, near the present Georgia–Florida border. During the 1790s, Colerain became the site of a United States government trading factory serving the Creek people and an important diplomatic meeting place. The Treaty of Colerain between the United States and the Creek Nation was signed there on June 29, 1796.

== Etymology ==
According to local historical traditions, two theories have been advanced regarding the origin of the community's name. One tradition states that it was named after "Coleraine", a local Native American chieftain. Another holds that the name was transferred from Coleraine, a town in County Londonderry, Ireland.

== History ==
=== early trade ===
Colerain developed around a small trading post on the northern bank of the St. Marys River, which forms part of the boundary between southeastern Georgia and northeastern Florida. The site was associated with Native American settlement and later with European-American traders operating in the region. During the British colonial period, Colonel James Grant, the first governor of British East Florida, financed construction of a portion of the King's Road. The road extended north from New Smyrna Beach, Florida, toward the St. Marys River and Colerain, connecting the settlement with the wider transportation network of the region.

== Eighteenth Century ==
During the 1790s, the federal government established a government trading factory at Colerain for trade with the Muscogee (Creek) people. The factory system established government-supervised trading houses intended to promote economic relationships and maintain peaceful relations on the frontier. Indian Agent James Seagrove managed the post, which was also associated with a garrison of federal troops. The factory remained at Colerain until 1797, when the operation was relocated inland to Fort Wilkinson.

On June 29, 1796, representatives of the United States and the Creek Nation met at Colerain and concluded the Treaty of Colerain. The United States commissioners were Benjamin Hawkins, George Clymer, and Andrew Pickens. The Creek delegation included numerous chiefs and warriors.

The treaty reaffirmed obligations arising from earlier agreements between the United States and the Creek Nation and established provisions concerning boundaries and relations between the Creek Nation and the United States. It also authorized the establishment of United States trading or military posts on Creek lands, with provisions concerning their control and the reversion of the sites if the United States ceased to require them.

The treaty was controversial among some white Georgians, particularly because state interests sought greater concessions and the agreement reflected the growing role of the federal government in Native American affairs.

== Nineteenth century ==
In 1825, Congress authorized construction of a military road connecting Tampa Bay with Colerain on the St. Marys River. The Army divided the project into sections, with Fort Brooke at Tampa Bay serving as a base for the southern section to Wanton's and the northern section extending from Wanton's to Colerain.

The route incorporated improvements to existing roads and trails in northern Florida and connected with transportation routes leading to the St. Marys River and Colerain. Congress appropriated additional funds in 1827 for completion of the road between Colerain and Tampa Bay.

Subsequently Colerain declined in importance as other settlements and trading centers developed along the St. Marys River. Trader's Hill, also known as Fort Alert, became an important trading center farther upriver, while other settlements subsequently assumed greater importance in the region.

== Decline ==
Colerain gradually ceased to function as an active trading settlement as commerce and transportation patterns shifted elsewhere along the St. Marys River. By the nineteenth century, the settlement had declined substantially and eventually became an extinct settlement.
