= Middleburg, Florida =

- Census-designated place
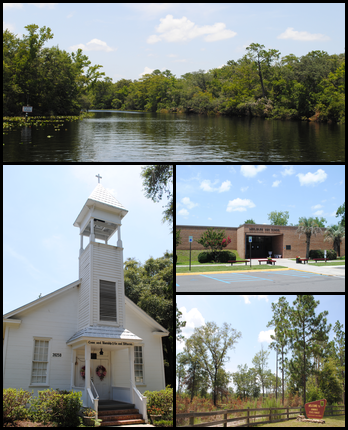
- Top, left to right: Black Creek, Middleburg United Methodist Church, Middleburg High School, Jennings State Forest

- Location in Clay County and the state of Florida
- Coordinates: 30°02′53″N 81°54′14″W
- Country: United States
- State: Florida
- County: Clay

Area
  - Total: 19.62 sq mi (50.81 km^{2})
  - Land: 19.62 sq mi (50.81 km^{2})
  - Water: 0 sq mi (0.00 km^{2})
- Elevation: 56 ft (17 m)

Population (2020)
  - Total: 12,881
  - Density: 656.6/sq mi (253.53/km^{2})
- Time zone: UTC−5 (Eastern (EST))
  - Summer (DST): UTC−4 (EDT)
- ZIP Codes: 32050, 32068
- Area code(s): 904, 324
- FIPS code: 12-45350
- GNIS feature ID: 2403285

Middleburg is an unincorporated area and census-designated place (CDP) within Clay County in the U.S. state of Florida, located 26 miles (42 km) southwest of downtown Jacksonville and 16 miles (26 km) northwest of Green Cove Springs, the county seat of Clay County. As of the 2020 census, the population of Middleburg was 12,881, down from 13,008 at the 2010 census. It is part of the Jacksonville, Florida Metropolitan Statistical Area.

It is home to Middleburg High School and to the Middleburg Historic District.

== Geography ==
Middleburg is located northwest of the center of Clay County. Florida State Road Blanding Boulevard leads northeast 13 miles (21 km) to the Orange Park area and southwest 23 miles (37 km) to Keystone Heights.

According to the United States Census Bureau, the Middleburg CDP has a total area of 19.6 square miles (50.7 km^{2}), all land.

== Demographics ==
Historical population
Census	Pop.	Note	%±
1990	6,223		—
2000	10,338		66.1%
2010	13,008		25.8%
2020	12,881		−1.0%
U.S. Decennial Census

=== 2020 census ===
As of the 2020 census, Middleburg had a population of 12,881. The median age was 42.1 years. 21.9% of residents were under the age of 18 and 16.7% of residents were 65 years of age or older. For every 100 females there were 101.5 males, and for every 100 females age 18 and over there were 100.2 males age 18 and over.

87.0% of residents lived in urban areas, while 13.0% lived in rural areas.

There were 4,666 households in Middleburg, of which 31.3% had children under the age of 18 living in them. Of all households, 55.2% were married-couple households, 16.2% were households with a male householder and no spouse or partner present, and 20.2% were households with a female householder and no spouse or partner present. About 17.9% of all households were made up of individuals and 7.7% had someone living alone who was 65 years of age or older.

There were 5,005 housing units, of which 6.8% were vacant. The homeowner vacancy rate was 1.8% and the rental vacancy rate was 6.7%.

Racial composition as of the 2020 census
Race	Number	Percent
White	11,125	86.4%
Black or African American	367	2.8%
American Indian and Alaska Native	68	0.5%
Asian	116	0.9%
Native Hawaiian and Other Pacific Islander	13	0.1%
Some other race	190	1.5%
Two or more races	1,002	7.8%
Hispanic or Latino (of any race)	700	5.4%

=== 2010 census ===
As of the 2010 census, there were 13,008 people living in 4,891 housing units within the CDP. Between the 2000 and 2010 census, Middleburg realized a population increase of 2,670 individuals. The racial makeup of the CDP was 92.9% White, 3.1% African American, 0.6% Native American, 0.7% Asian, 0.0% Pacific Islander, 0.9% from other races, and 1.8% from two or more races. Hispanic or Latino people of any race were 4.1% of the population.

In the CDP, the population was spread out, with 24.87% under the age of 18, 75.13% age of 18 or over, and 10.36% age of 65 or over. The population was 49.7% female and 50.3% male.

== History ==
=== Early Settlement ===
At the time of European contact the region was inhabited by Timucua Native Americans. In 1824 the United States Congress passed a bill providing the Florida territory national funding to construct a military route spanning from Colerain, Georgia southwest to Tampa Bay, with long-term goals of expelling and relocating the Seminole Native American population then residing there, encouraging settlement and development by American settlers. Completed by 1827, the "federal road" provided a route through the area between the north and south forks of Black Creek.

Asa Clark operated a ferry service on the north fork of Black Creek in the 1820s, leading the vicinity of his ferry travels to be colloquially referred to as Clark's Ferry. In February 1828, Isaac Boring founded the Black Creek Methodist Church, and later that year Clark's business was acquired by John Hanson, who traversed the same area through 1833, after which he sold to Samuel and Charlotte Garey, for whom the village was officially named Garey's Ferry, listed as such on state maps from as early as 1836.

By this time, commerce and travel to the area was increasing, and multiple ferry services travelled to and from Garey's Ferry and Whitesville. George Branning and Ozias Budington each operated their own ferry operations in competition with the Gareys; Budington largely focused on the south fork and facilitated the building and expansion of Whitesville, which ultimately grew large enough to warrant its own United States Post Office and a jailhouse (Blakey, 1976).

=== Forts Heileman and Sanderson ===
The community expanded rapidly during the Second Seminole War. Fort Heileman, a wooden stockade fortification located between the North and South prongs of Black Creek, was hastily built in 1836 and protected settlers at Garey's Ferry where it was the "principal depot for the east coast of Florida."

During the Seminole Wars, Fort Heileman was used as a quartermaster workshop and storage depot until its armaments were moved to Fort Shannon in Palatka and the fort was largely abandoned after June 18, 1841. The fort was permanently abandoned in 1842 and destroyed by a flood later that year. The only potential remnant of Fort Heileman is the Clark-Chalker House, which was built in 1835 and may have served as Fort Heileman's army hospital.

Fort Sanderson was constructed in July 1840 to be used for storage; both forts were abandoned the following year, and destroyed in a hurricane in 1842.

=== Consolidation of Middleburgh and Creation of Clay County ===
Garey's Ferry expanded following the Seminole Wars, growing quickly and trading in timber, citrus fruits, cotton, and farm crops. In 1851, Garey's Ferry and Whitesville were consolidated into the town of Middleburgh, and the post office moved from Whitesville to its current location on Palmetto Street. Clay County (named for Henry Clay) was created from Duval County in December 1858, and Middleburgh became and remained the county seat until 1874.

Throughout the 1850s, as national tensions leading to the American Civil War were increasing, Middleburgh and Clay County remained a stronghold of Whig voters and pro-Union sentiment; in 1859, Whitesville residents renamed their community "Webster" in honor of Whig politician Daniel Webster.

=== American Civil War ===
Having seceded in 1861, Florida was a state within the Confederate States of America. On October 23, 1864, during the American Civil War, the 4th Massachusetts Volunteer Cavalry engaged local Confederates in a skirmish from their base at the Magnolia Springs hotel. Moving into Middleburg the next day, October 24, 1864, the 4th Massachusetts raided and set fire to downtown Middleburg on Main Street and Thompson (now Wharf) Street, destroying Samuel B. Thompson's cotton warehouses and docks, as well as a hotel. The 2nd Florida Cavalry, under command of Captain J.J. Dickison, retaliated by firing on the Massachusetts regiment, leading the latter to retreat across Black Creek and burn the ferry bridge behind them. As the Massachusetts regiment rushed back to Magnolia Springs, Dickison's regiment detoured four miles through Whitesville and caught the Massachusetts regiment at Jeremiah Halsey's Plantation, engaging in a skirmish that resulted in twelve Union deaths and Confederate victory. This skirmish is known officially as the Battle of Halsey's Plantation, but has also been referred to as the Battle of Big Gum Creek. The exact location of Halsey's Plantation is not known, but it was near the site that is currently Shadowlawn Elementary School on County Road 218.

Among the repeated skirmishes between the 4th Massachusetts and 2nd Florida cavalries was a two-hour engagement in which Dickison's troops rescued cattle that had been seized by Union troops, which local history refers to as the Battle of the Tiger Head.

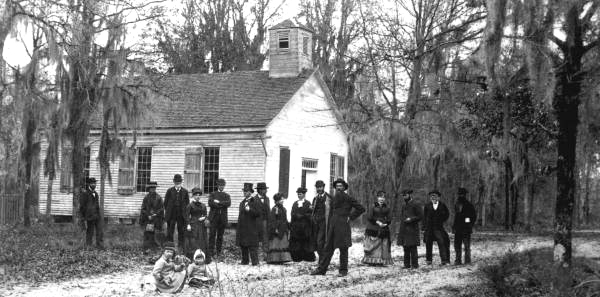
Methodist Church in the 1880s

=== Decline and expansion ===
Fewer than 100 residents remained in Middleburg following the end of the Civil War,. and held steady between 700 and 800 residents in the period between 1890 and 1920. The Great Freeze of 1895 in and a reduction of the river trade further contributed to the town's decline.

In the 1890s, African American homesteaders, starting with Grant Forman (1868-1951) in 1895, settled and developed the community of Hill Top in what is Forman Circle." According to "Embedded in Clay," Forman fled to South Carolina after his house was burned by a white mob. Frosard Budington, a leader of Whitesville, covered the cost of Forman's land taxes until such time as it was safe for Forman to return to Hill Top.

The 1989 film Brenda Starr was partially filmed on Black Creek.

Since the 1990s, Middleburg's population and industry have rapidly expanded along with the surrounding communities of Orange Park, Lakeside, Lake Asbury, Fleming Island, and Jacksonville. Because of this development, construction to extend the First Coast Expressway through the area is underway, including the addition of exit junctions in Middleburg, Green Cove Springs, and Asbury Lake.

== Notable people ==
- Gary Barnidge, NFL tight end
- Lenny Curry, mayor of Jacksonville, Florida
- Roy Geiger, USMC World War II
- Richard Owens, NFL tight end
- Donnie Van Zant, musician for 38 Special, Van Zant
- Johnny Van Zant musician for Lynyrd Skynyrd, Van Zant
- Slim Whitman, country singer and songwriter

Bands

- The Red Jumpsuit Apparatus, rock band
